= Junkers Ju 87 =

1935 dive bomber aircraft family by Junkers

Ju 87
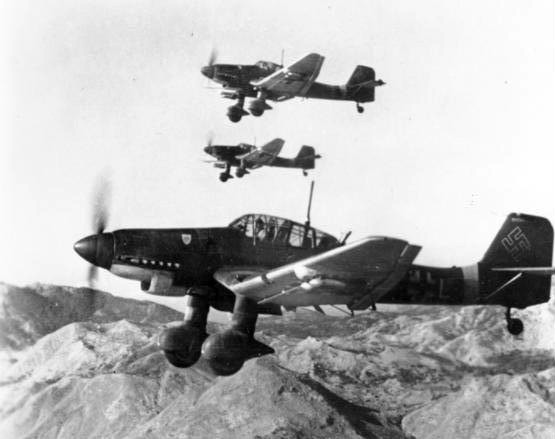
- Ju 87Ds in October 1943

General information
- Type: Dive bomber and ground-attack aircraft
- National origin: Nazi Germany
- Manufacturer: Junkers
- Designer: Hermann Pohlmann
- Primary users: Luftwaffe: Bulgarian Air Force; Regia Aeronautica; Royal Romanian Air Force
- Number built: 6,000 (Note: Figures are debated. Griehl cites additions of Chief engineer Pichon's list. This indicates 5,930 produced. Griehl points out this may include all machines, even those that were incomplete. Junkers records give 5,126 aircraft delivered to the Luftwaffe.)

History
- Introduction date: 1936
- First flight: 17 September 1935
- Retired: 1945

The Junkers Ju 87, popularly known as the "Stuka", (Note: /ˈstuːkə/; German: [ˈʃtuːkaː]; from Sturzkampfflugzeug, "dive bomber") is a German dive bomber and ground-attack aircraft. Designed by Hermann Pohlmann, it first flew in 1935. The Ju 87 made its combat debut in 1937 with the Luftwaffe's Condor Legion during the Spanish Civil War of 1936–1939 and served the Axis for all of World War II (1939–1945).

The aircraft is easily recognisable by its inverted gull wings and fixed spatted undercarriage. Upon the leading edges of its faired main gear legs were mounted ram-air sirens, officially called "Lärmgerät" (noise device), which became a propaganda symbol of German air power and of the Blitzkrieg victories of 1939–1942, as well as providing Stuka pilots with audible feedback as to speed. The Stuka's design included several innovations, including automatic pull-up dive brakes under both wings to ensure that the aircraft recovered from its attack dive even if the pilot blacked out from the high g-forces, or suffered from target fixation.

The Ju 87 operated with considerable success in close air support and anti-shipping roles at the outbreak of World War II. It led air assaults during the Invasion of Poland in September 1939. Stukas proved critical to the rapid conquest of Norway, the Netherlands, Belgium, and France in 1940. Though sturdy, accurate, and very effective against ground targets, the Stuka was, like many other dive bombers of the period, vulnerable to fighter aircraft. During the Battle of Britain of 1940–1941, its lack of manoeuvrability, speed, or defensive armament meant that it required a heavy fighter escort to operate effectively.

After the Battle of Britain, the Luftwaffe deployed Stukas in the Mediterranean and Middle East theatre. Stukas were also used during the early stages of the Eastern Front against the Soviet Union. Stuka units continued to be used for general ground support and in an anti-shipping role but also was used as a specialised anti-tank aircraft. Once the Luftwaffe lost air superiority, the Stuka became an easy target for enemy fighters, but it continued being produced until 1944 for lack of a better replacement. By 1945 ground-attack versions of the Focke-Wulf Fw 190 had largely replaced the Ju 87, but it remained in service until the end of the war in 1945.

Germany built an estimated 6,000 Ju 87s of all versions between 1936 and August 1944. During the conflict, Oberst Hans-Ulrich Rudel became the most successful Stuka pilot and the most highly decorated German pilot of the war.

== Development ==
=== Early design ===
The Ju 87's principal designer, Hermann Pohlmann, held the opinion that any dive bomber design needed to be simple and robust. This led to many technical innovations, such as the retractable undercarriage being discarded in favour of one of the Stuka's distinctive features, its fixed and "spatted" undercarriage. Pohlmann continued to carry on developing and adding to his ideas and those of Diplom Ing Karl Plauth (Plauth was killed in a flying accident in November 1927), and produced the Ju A 48, which underwent testing on 29 September 1928. The military version of the Ju A 48 was designated the Ju K 47.

After the Nazis came to power, the design was given priority. Despite initial competition from the Henschel Hs 123, the Reichsluftfahrtministerium (RLM/German aviation ministry) turned to the designs of Herman Pohlmann of Junkers and co-designer of the K 47, Karl Plauth. During the trials with the K 47 in 1932, double vertical stabilisers were introduced to give the rear gunner a better field of fire. The main, and what was to be the most distinctive, feature of the Ju 87 was its double-spar inverted gull wings. After Plauth's death, Pohlmann continued the development of the Junkers dive bomber. The Ju A 48 registration D-ITOR, was originally fitted with a BMW 132 engine, producing 450 kW (600 hp). The machine was also fitted with dive brakes for dive testing. The aircraft was given a good evaluation and "exhibited very good flying characteristics".

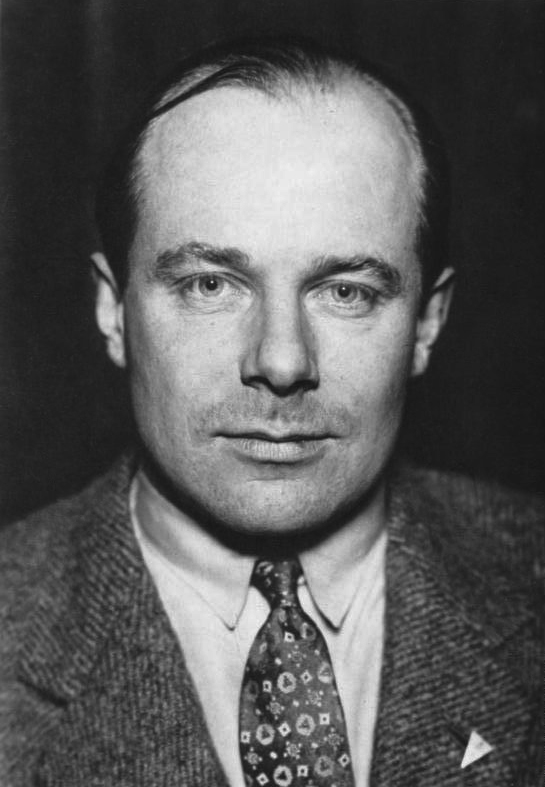
Ernst Udet; proponent of the dive bomber and the Ju 87 (1928 photo)

Ernst Udet took an immediate liking to the concept of dive-bombing after flying the Curtiss F11C Goshawk. When Walther Wever and Robert Ritter von Greim were invited to watch Udet perform a trial flight in May 1934 at the Jüterbog artillery range, it raised doubts about the capability of the dive bomber. Udet began his dive at 1,000 m (3,300 ft) and released his 1 kg (2.2 lb) bombs at 100 m (330 ft), barely recovering and pulling out of the dive. The chief of the Luftwaffe Command Office Walther Wever, and the Secretary of State for Aviation Erhard Milch, feared that such high-level nerves and skill could not be expected of "average pilots" in the Luftwaffe. Nevertheless, development continued at Junkers.

Udet's "growing love affair" with the dive bomber pushed it to the forefront of German aviation development. Udet went so far as to advocate that all medium bombers should have dive-bombing capabilities, which initially doomed the only dedicated, strategic heavy bomber design to enter German front-line service during the war years—the 30-metre wingspan Heinkel He 177A—into having an airframe design (due to Udet examining its design details in November 1937) that could perform "medium angle" dive-bombing missions, until Reichsmarschall Hermann Göring exempted the He 177A, Germany's only operational heavy bomber, in September 1942 from being given the task of such a mismatched mission profile for its large airframe.

=== Evolution ===
The design of the Ju 87 had begun in 1933 as part of the Sturzbomber-Programm. The Ju 87 was to be powered by the British Rolls-Royce Kestrel liquid-cooled V12 engine, ten of which were ordered by Junkers on 19 April 1934 at a cost of £20,514 2s 6d (equivalent to £1,629,400 in 2024). The first Ju 87 prototype was built by AB Flygindustri in Sweden and secretly brought to Germany in late 1934. It was to have been completed in April 1935, but, due to the inadequate strength of the airframe, construction took until October 1935. The mostly complete Ju 87 V1 W.Nr. (Note: Werknummer (W.Nr.) means "works number" of the factory. The number can usually be found on the vertical stabiliser of all German military aircraft of the Second World War.) 4921 (less non-essential parts) took off for its maiden flight on 17 September 1935. The aircraft was later given the registration D-UBYR. The flight report, by Hauptmann Willy Neuenhofen, stated the only problem was with the small radiator, which caused the engine to overheat.

The Ju 87 V1, powered by a Kestrel engine and fitted with a twin tail, crashed on 24 January 1936 at Kleutsch near Dresden, killing Junkers' chief test pilot, Willy Neuenhofen, and his engineer, Heinrich Kreft. The square twin fins and rudders proved too weak; they collapsed and the aircraft crashed after it entered an inverted spin during the testing of the terminal dynamic pressure in a dive. The crash prompted a change to a single vertical stabiliser tail design. To withstand strong forces during a dive, heavy plating, along with brackets riveted to the frame and longeron, was fitted to the fuselage. Other early additions included the installation of hydraulic dive brakes that were fitted under the leading edge and could rotate 90°.

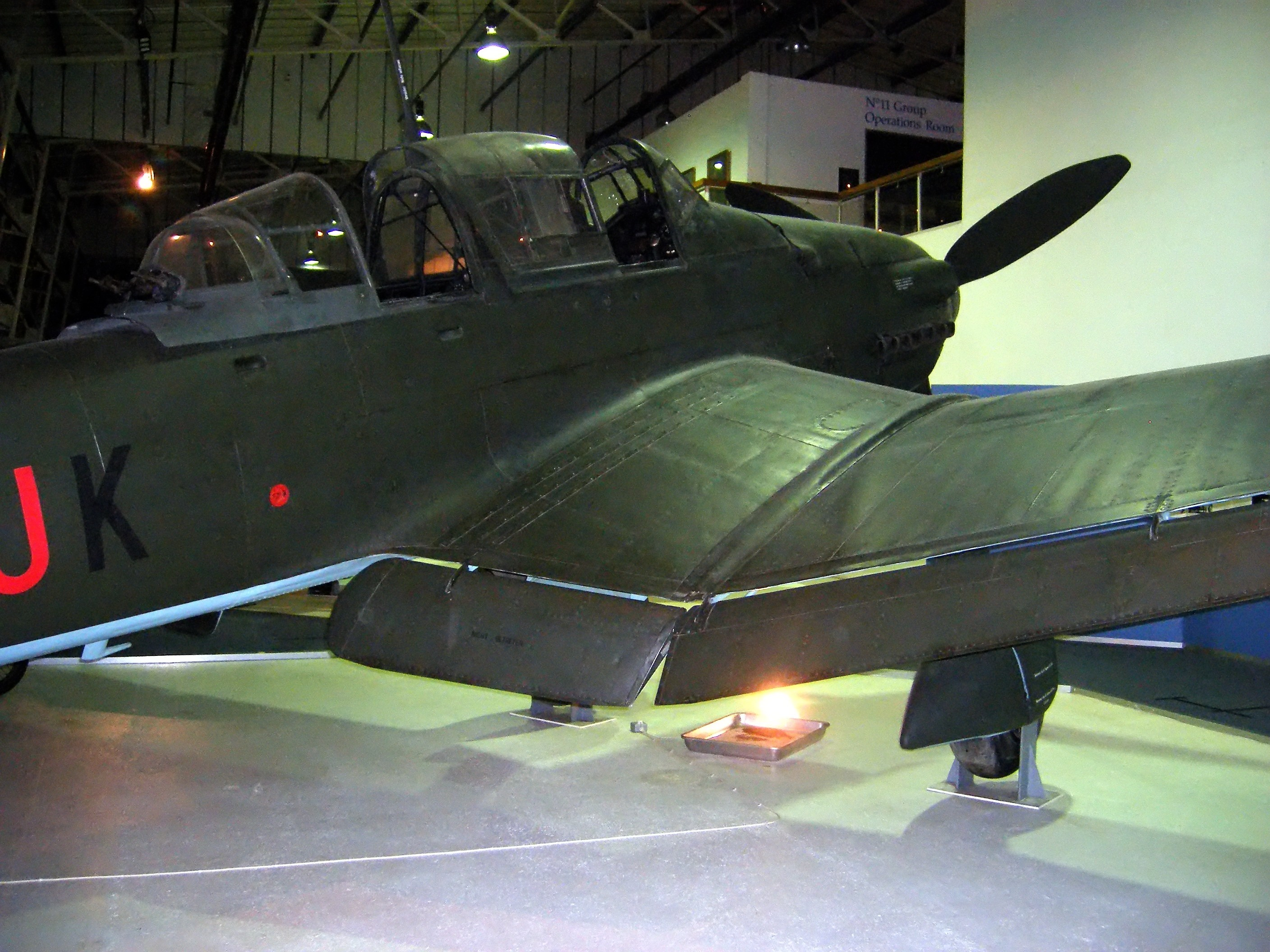
The Stuka had inverted gull wings, as shown in this photograph. Also visible are the two separate sliding "hoods" of the canopy.

The RLM was still not interested in the Ju 87 and was not impressed that it relied on a British engine. In late 1935, Junkers suggested fitting a DB 600 inverted V12 engine, with the final variant to be equipped with the Jumo 210. This was accepted by the RLM as an interim solution. The reworking of the design began on 1 January 1936. The test flight could not be carried out for over two months due to a lack of adequate aircraft. The 24 January crash had already destroyed one machine. The second prototype was beset by design problems; it had its twin stabilisers removed and a single tail fin installed due to fears over stability. Due to a shortage of engines, instead of a DB 600, a BMW "Hornet" engine was fitted. All these delays set back testing until 25 February 1936.

By March 1936, the second prototype, the V2, was finally fitted with the Junkers Jumo 210Aa engine, which a year later was replaced by a Jumo 210 G (W.Nr. 19310). The testing went well, and the pilot, Flight Captain Hesselbach, praised its performance. However, Wolfram von Richthofen, in charge of developing and testing new aircraft in the Technisches Amt, or Technical Service, told the Junkers representative and Construction Office chief engineer Ernst Zindel that the Ju 87 stood little chance of becoming the Luftwaffe's main dive bomber, as it was underpowered, in his opinion. On 9 June 1936, the RLM ordered cessation of development in favour of the Heinkel He 118, a rival design. Udet cancelled the order the next day, and development continued.

On 27 July 1936, Udet crashed the He 118 prototype, He 118 V1 D-UKYM. That same day, Charles Lindbergh was visiting Ernst Heinkel, so Heinkel could communicate with Udet only by telephone. According to this version of the story, Heinkel warned Udet about the propeller's fragility. Udet failed to consider this, so in a dive, the engine oversped and the propeller broke away. Immediately after this incident, Udet announced the Stuka the winner of the development contest.

=== Refinements ===
Despite being chosen, the design was still lacking and drew frequent criticism from Wolfram von Richthofen. Testing of the V4 prototype (A Ju 87 A-0) in early 1937 revealed several problems. The Ju 87 could take off in 250 m (820 ft) and climb to 1,875 m (6,152 ft) in eight minutes with a 250 kg (550 lb) bomb load, and its cruising speed was 250 km/h (160 mph). Richthofen pushed for a more powerful engine. According to the test pilots, the Heinkel He 50 had a better acceleration rate, and could climb away from the target area much more quickly, avoiding enemy ground and air defences. Richthofen stated that any maximum speed below 350 km/h (220 mph) was unacceptable for those reasons. Pilots also complained that navigation and powerplant instruments were mixed together and not easy to read, especially in combat. Despite this, pilots praised the aircraft's handling qualities and strong airframe.

These problems were to be resolved by installing the DB 600 engine, but delays in development forced the installation of the Jumo 210 D inverted V-12 engine. Flight testing began on 14 August 1936. Subsequent testing and progress fell short of Richthofen's hopes, although the machine's speed was increased to 280 km/h (170 mph) at ground level and 290 km/h (180 mph) at 1,250 m (4,100 ft), while maintaining its good handling ability.

== Design ==
=== Basic design (based on the B series) ===
The Ju 87 was a single-engined all-metal cantilever monoplane. It had a fixed undercarriage and could carry a two-person crew. The main construction material was duralumin, and the external coverings were made of duralumin sheeting. Parts that were required to be of strong construction, such as the wing flaps, were made of Pantal (a German aluminium alloy containing titanium as a hardening element) and its components made of Elektron. Bolts and parts that were required to take heavy stress were made of steel.

The Ju 87 was fitted with detachable hatches and removable coverings to aid and ease maintenance and overhaul. The designers avoided welding parts wherever possible, preferring moulded and cast parts instead. Large airframe segments were interchangeable as a complete unit, which increased speed of repair.

The airframe was also subdivided into sections to allow transport by road or rail. The wings were of standard Junkers double-wing construction. This gave the Ju 87 a considerable advantage on take-off; even at a shallow angle, large lift forces were created through the aerofoil, reducing take-off and landing runs.

In accordance with the Aircraft Certification Centre for "Stress Group 5", the Ju 87 had reached the acceptable structural strength requirements for a dive bomber. It was able to withstand diving speeds of 600 km/h (370 mph) and a maximum level speed of 340 km/h (210 mph) near ground level, and a flying weight of 4,300 kg (9,500 lb). Performance in the diving attack was enhanced by the introduction of dive brakes under each wing, which allowed the Ju 87 to maintain a constant speed and allow the pilot to steady his aim. It also prevented the crew from suffering extreme g-forces and high acceleration during "pull-out" from the dive.

The fuselage had an oval cross-section and housed, in most examples, a Junkers Jumo 211, water-cooled, inverted V-12 engine. The cockpit was protected from the engine by a firewall ahead of the wing centre section where the fuel tanks were located. At the rear of the cockpit, the bulkhead was covered by a canvas cover which could be breached by the crew in an emergency, enabling them to escape into the main fuselage. The canopy was split into two sections and joined by a strong welded steel frame. The canopy itself was made of Plexiglas and each compartment had its own "sliding hood" for the two crew members.

The engine was mounted on two main support frames that were supported by two tubular struts. The frame structure was triangulated and emanated from the fuselage. The main frames were bolted onto the engine's top quarter. In turn, the frames were attached to the firewall by universal joints. The firewall itself was constructed from asbestos mesh with dural sheets on both sides. All conduits passing through had to be arranged so that no harmful gases could penetrate the cockpit.

The fuel system comprised two fuel tanks between the main (forward) and rear spars of the (inner) anhedral wing section of the port and starboard wings, each with 240-litre (63 US gal) capacity. The tanks also had a predetermined limit which, if passed, would warn the pilot via a red warning light in the cockpit. The fuel was injected via a pump from the tanks to the engine. Should this shut down, it could be pumped manually using a hand-pump on the fuel cock armature. The powerplant was cooled by a 10-litre (2.6 US gal), ring-shaped aluminium water container situated between the propeller and engine. A further container of 20-litre (5.3 US gal) was positioned under the engine.

The control surfaces operated in much the same way as other aircraft, with the exception of the innovative automatic pull-out system. Releasing the bomb initiated the pull-out, or automatic recovery and climb, upon the deflection of the dive brakes. The pilot could override the system by exerting significant force on the control column and taking manual control.

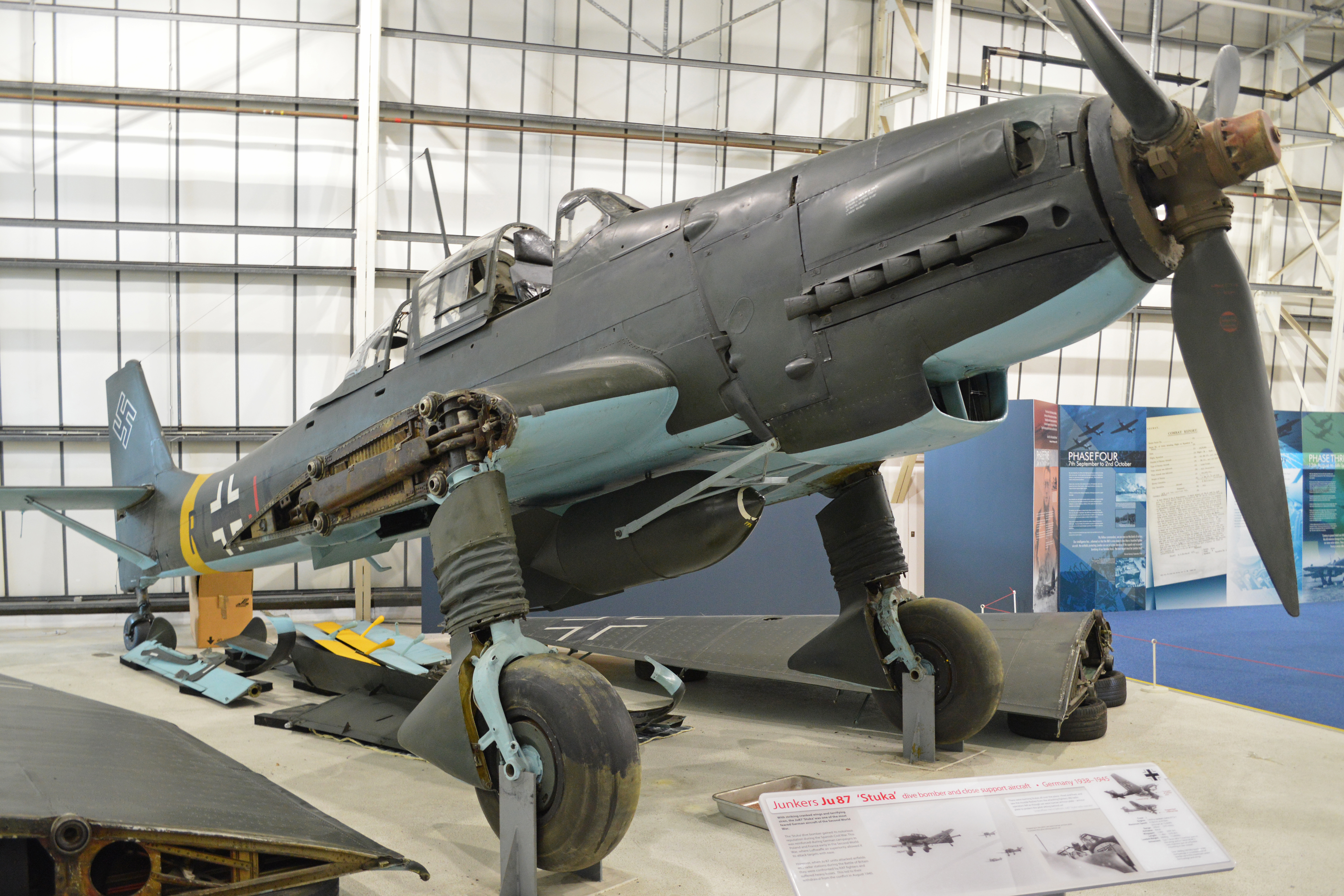
The RAF Museum's Ju 87, 2016, partially disassembled, showing the four attachment points for the outer wing section

The wing was the most unusual feature. It consisted of a single centre section and two outer sections, each installed using four universal joints. The centre section had a large negative dihedral (anhedral) and the outer surfaces a positive dihedral. This created the inverted gull wing, or "cranked" wing, pattern along the leading edge. The shape of the wing improved the pilot's ground visibility and also allowed a shorter undercarriage height. The centre section protruded by only 1 m (3 ft 3 in) on either side.

This video shows a Junkers Ju-87 bombing a ship. The video includes the "Jericho Trumpet" sound.

The offensive armament was two 7.92 mm (.312 in) MG 17 machine guns fitted one in each wing outboard of undercarriage, operated by a mechanical pneumatics system from the pilot's control column. The rear gunner/radio operator operated one 7.92 mm (.312 in) MG 15 machine gun for defensive purposes.

The engine and propeller had automatic controls, and an auto-trimmer made the aircraft tail-heavy as the pilot rolled over into his dive, lining up red lines at 60°, 75°, or 80° on the cockpit side window with the horizon and aiming at the target with the sight of the fixed gun. The heavy bomb was swung down clear of the propeller on crutches prior to release.

=== Diving procedure ===
Ju 87 diving procedure

Flying at 4,600 m (15,100 ft), the pilot located his target through a bombsight window in the cockpit floor. The pilot moved the dive lever to the rear, limiting the "throw" of the control column. The dive brakes were activated automatically, the pilot set the trim tabs, reduced his throttle and closed the coolant flaps. The aircraft then rolled 180°, automatically nosing the aircraft into a dive. Red tabs protruded from the upper surfaces of the wing as a visual indicator to the pilot that, in case of a g-force induced black-out, the automatic dive recovery system would be activated. The Stuka dived at a 60–90° angle, holding a constant speed of 500–600 km/h (310–370 mph) due to dive-brake deployment, which increased the accuracy of the Ju 87's aim.

When the aircraft was reasonably close to the target, a light on the contact altimeter (an altimeter equipped with an electrical contact which triggers at a preset altitude) came on to indicate the bomb-release point, usually at a minimum height of 450 m (1,480 ft). The pilot released the bomb and initiated the automatic pull-out mechanism by depressing a knob on the control column. An elongated U-shaped crutch located under the fuselage swung the bomb out of the way of the propeller, and the aircraft automatically began a 6g pullout. Once the nose was above the horizon, dive brakes were retracted, the throttle was opened, and the propeller was set to climb. The pilot regained control and resumed normal flight. The coolant flaps had to be reopened quickly to prevent overheating. The automatic pull-out was not liked by all pilots; Helmut Mahlke later said that he and his unit disconnected the system because it allowed the enemy to predict the Ju 87's recovery pattern and height, making it easier for ground defences to hit an aircraft.

Physical stress on the crew was severe. Human beings subjected to more than 5g in a seated position will suffer vision impairment in the form of a greyout or "grey veil", known to Stuka pilots as "seeing stars". They lose vision while remaining conscious; after five seconds, they black out. The Ju 87 pilots experienced the visual impairments most during "pull-up" from a dive.

Eric "Winkle" Brown of the Royal Navy, a British test pilot and Commanding Officer of No. 1426 Flight RAF (the captured enemy aircraft Flight), tested the Ju 87 at RAE Farnborough. He said of the Stuka, "I had flown a lot of dive-bombers and it's the only one that you can dive truly vertically. Sometimes with the dive-bombers ... maximum dive is usually in the order of 60 degrees ... When flying the Stuka, because it's all automatic, you are really flying vertically ... The Stuka was in a class of its own."

=== G-force test at Dessau ===
Extensive tests were carried out by the Junkers works at their Dessau plant. It was discovered that the highest load a pilot could endure was 8.5 g for three seconds, when the aircraft was pushed to its limit by the centrifugal forces. At less than 4 g, no visual problems or loss of consciousness were experienced. Above 6 g, 50% of pilots suffered visual problems, or greyout. With 40%, vision vanished altogether from 7.5 g upwards and black-out sometimes occurred. Despite this blindness, the pilot could maintain consciousness and was capable of "bodily reactions". After more than three seconds, half the subjects passed out. The pilot would regain consciousness two or three seconds after the centrifugal forces had dropped below 3 g and had lasted no longer than three seconds.

In a crouched position, pilots could withstand 7.5 g and were able to remain functional for a short duration. In this position, Junkers concluded that 2/3 of pilots could withstand 8 g and perhaps 9 g for three to five seconds without vision defects which, under war conditions, was acceptable. During tests with the Ju 87 A-2, new technologies were tried out to reduce the effects of g-forces. The pressurised cabin was of great importance during this research. Testing revealed that at high altitude, even 2 g could cause death in an unpressurised cabin and without appropriate clothing. This new technology, along with special clothing and oxygen masks, was researched and tested. When the United States Army occupied the Junkers factory at Dessau on 21 April 1945, they were both impressed at and interested in the medical flight tests with the Ju 87.

=== Other designs ===
The concept of dive bombing became so popular among the leadership of the Luftwaffe that it became almost obligatory in new aircraft designs. Later bomber models like the Junkers Ju 88 and the Dornier Do 217 were equipped for dive bombing. The Heinkel He 177 strategic bomber was initially supposed to have dive bombing capabilities, a requirement that contributed to the failure of the design, with the requirement not rescinded until September 1942 by Göring.

Once the Stuka became too vulnerable to fighter opposition on all fronts, work was done to develop a replacement. None of the dedicated close-support designs on the drawing board progressed far due to the impact of the war and technological difficulties. The Luftwaffe settled on the Focke-Wulf Fw 190 fighter aircraft, with the Fw 190F becoming the ground-attack version. The Fw 190F started to replace the Ju 87 for day missions in 1943, but the Ju 87 continued to be used as a night nuisance-raider until the end of the war.

== Variants ==
=== Ju 87 A ===
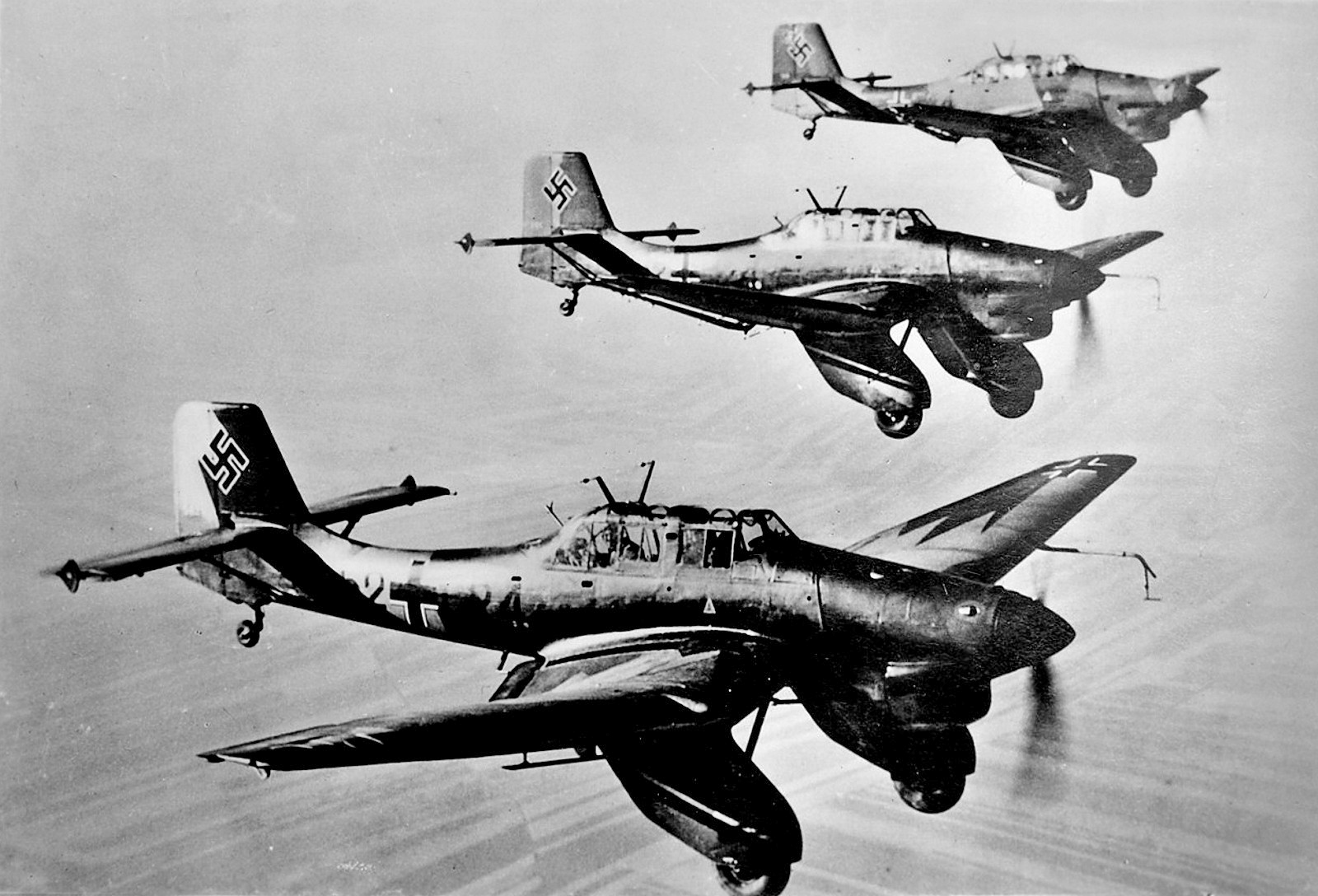
Formation of Ju 87 A dive bombers, with the A's characteristic large wheel "trousers", each having one transverse bracing strut

The second prototype had a redesigned single vertical stabiliser and a 610 PS (601.7 hp; 448.7 kW) Jumo 210 A engine installed, and later the Jumo 210Da. The first A series variant, the A-0, was of all-metal construction, with an enclosed cockpit under a "greenhouse" well-framed canopy; bearing twin radio masts on its aft sections, diagonally mounted to either side of the airframe's planform centreline and unique to the -A version. To ease the difficulty of mass production, the leading edge of the wing was straightened out and the ailerons' two aerofoil sections had smooth leading and trailing edges. The pilot could adjust the elevator and rudder trim tabs in flight, and the tail was connected to the landing flaps, which were positioned in two parts between the ailerons and fuselage. The A-0 also had a flatter engine cowling, which gave the pilot a much better field of vision. In order for the engine cowling to be flattened, the engine was set down nearly 0.25 m (9.8 in). The fuselage was also lowered along with the gunner's position, allowing the gunner a better field of fire.

The RLM ordered seven A-0s initially, but then increased the order to 11. Early in 1937, the A-0 was tested with varied bomb loads. The underpowered Jumo 210A, as pointed out by von Richthofen, was insufficient, and was quickly replaced with the Jumo 210D engine.

The A-1 differed from the A-0 only slightly. As well as the installation of the Jumo 210D, the A-1 had two 220 L (58 US gal; 48 imp gal) fuel tanks built into the inner wing, but it was not armoured or protected. The A-1 was also intended to be fitted with four 7.92 mm (0.312 in) MG 17 machine guns in its wings, but two of these—one per side—were omitted due to weight concerns; the pair that remained were fed a total of 500 rounds of ammunition, stored in the design's characteristic transverse strut-braced, large-planform undercarriage "trousers", not used on the Ju 87B versions and onward. The pilot relied on the Revi C 21C gun sight for the two MG 17s. The gunner had a single 7.92 mm (0.312 in) MG 15, with 14 drums of ammunition, each containing 75 rounds. This represented a 150-round increase in this area over the Ju 87 A-0. The A-1 was also fitted with a larger 3.3 m (11 ft) propeller.

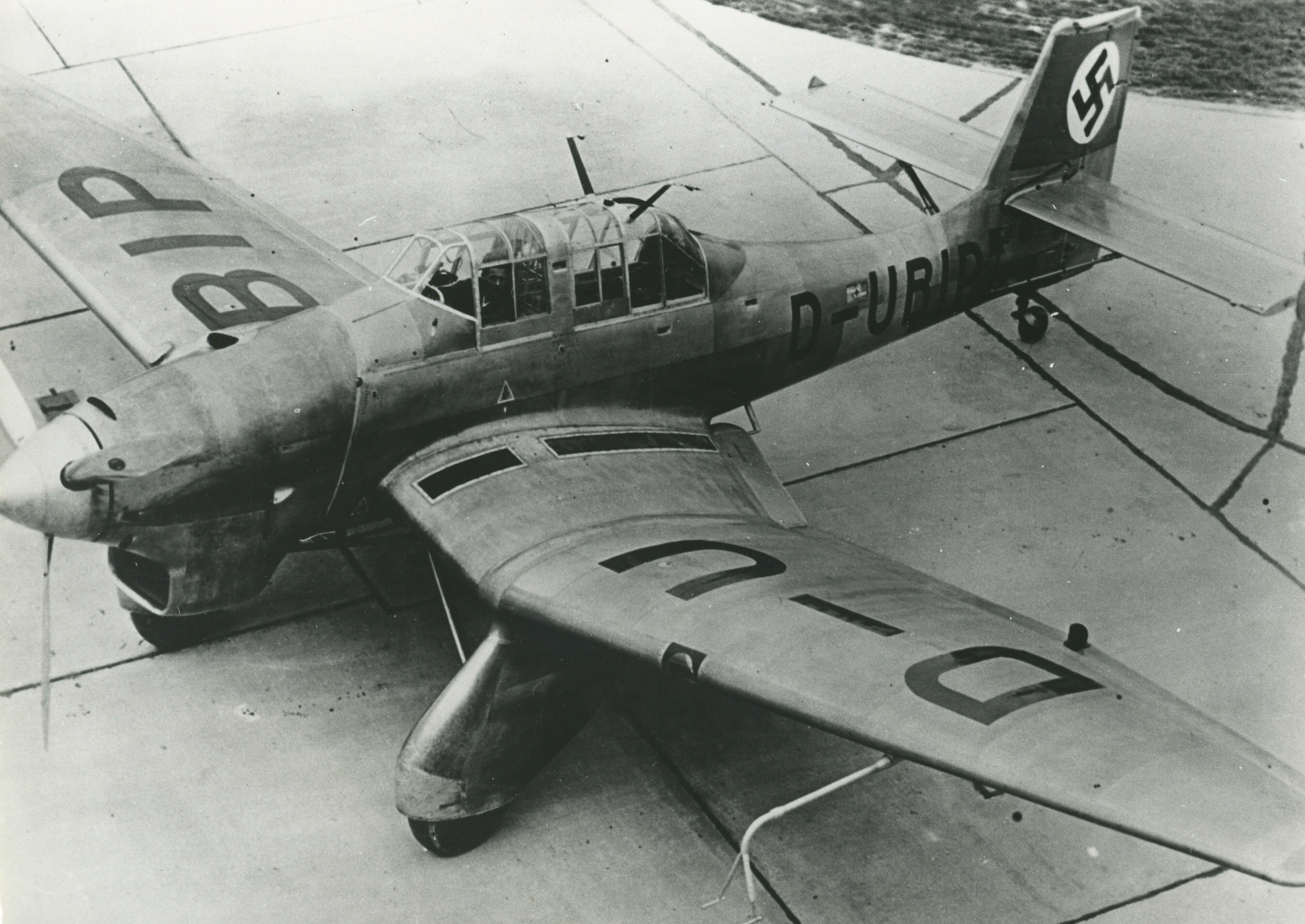
The Ju 87 V4 prototype in 1936

The Ju 87 was capable of carrying a 500 kg (1,100 lb) bomb, but only if not carrying the rear gunner/radio operator as, even with the Jumo 210D, the Ju 87 was still underpowered for operations with more than a 250 kg (550 lb) bomb load. All Ju 87 As were restricted to 250 kg (550 lb) weapons (although during the Spanish Civil War, missions were conducted without the gunner).

The Ju 87 A-2 was retrofitted with the Jumo 210Da fitted with a two-gear supercharger. The only further significant difference between the A-1 and A-2 was the H-PA-III controllable-pitch propeller. By mid-1938, 262 Ju 87 As had been produced, 192 from the Junkers factory in Dessau and a further 70 from Weser Flugzeugbau ("Weserflug" – WFG) in Lemwerder near Bremen. The new, more powerful, Ju 87B model started to replace the Ju 87A at this time.

Production variants

- Ju 87 A-0 : Ten pre-production aircraft, powered by a 640 PS (471 kW or 632 hp) Jumo 210C engine.
- Ju 87 A-1 : Initial production version.
- Ju 87 A-2 : Production version fitted with an improved 680 PS (500 kW or 670 hp) Jumo 210E engine.

=== Ju 87 B ===
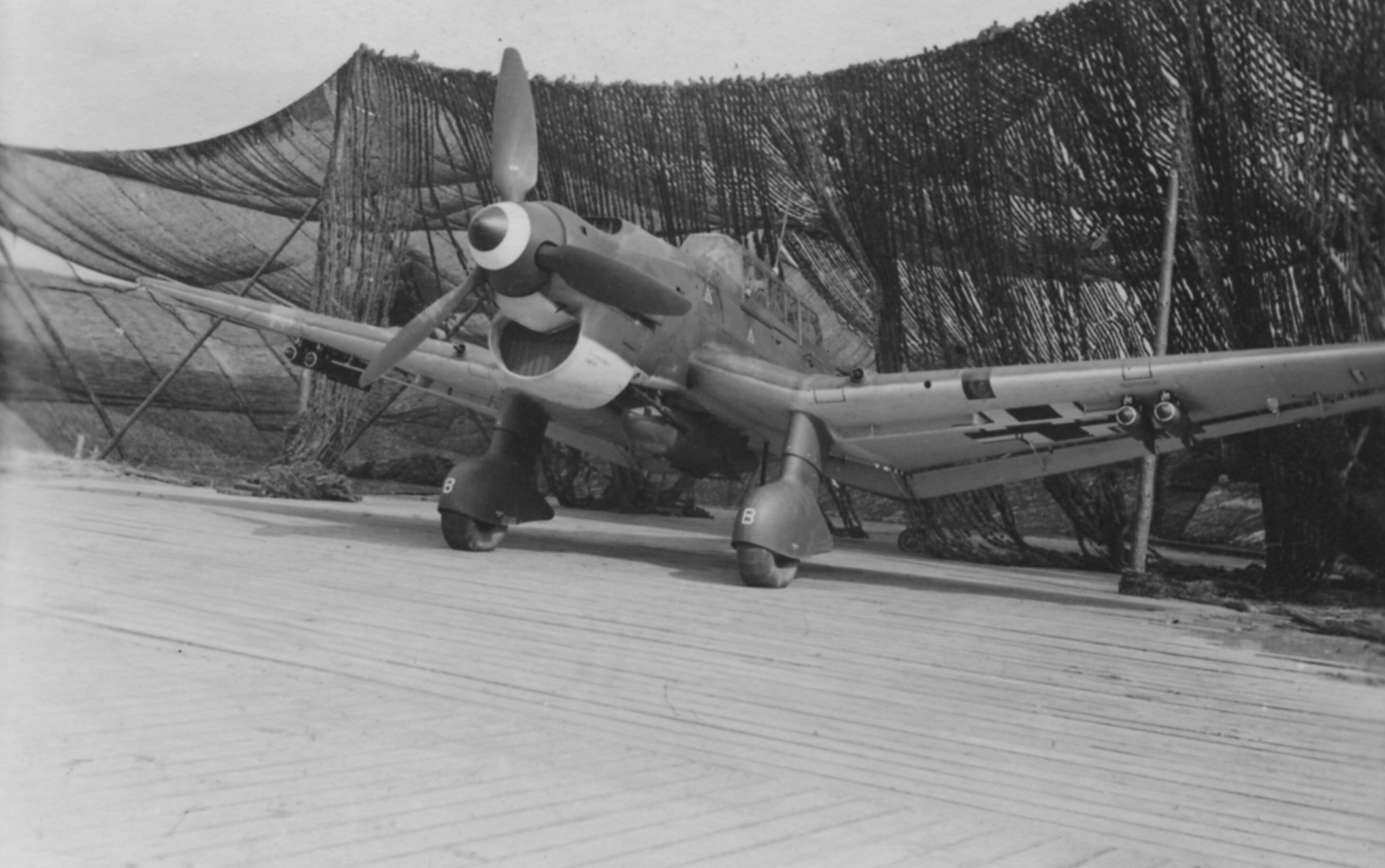
Junkers Ju 87 B parked at Schiphol airport in the Netherlands, 1940.

The Ju 87 B series was to be the first mass-produced variant. A total of six pre-production Ju 87 B-0 were produced, built from Ju 87 A airframes. The first production version was the Ju 87 B-1, with a considerably larger engine, its Jumo 211D generating 1,200 PS (883 kW or 1,184 hp), and completely redesigned fuselage and landing gear, replacing the twin radio masts of the "A" version with a single mast mounted further forward on the "greenhouse" canopy, and much simpler, lighter-weight wheel "spats" used from the -B version onwards, discarding the transverse strut bracing of the "A" version's maingear design. This new design was again tested in Spain, and after proving its abilities there, production was ramped up to 60 per month. As a result, by the outbreak of World War II, the Luftwaffe had 336 Ju 87 B-1s on hand.

The B-1 was also fitted with "Lärmgeräte" sirens driven by propellers with a diameter of 0.7 m (2.3 ft). The devices caused a loss of 20–25 km/h (12–15 mph) through drag, and over time the sirens were no longer installed on many units, although they remained in use to various extents. As an alternative, some bombs were fitted with whistles on the fin to produce the noise after release. The trumpets were a suggestion from Udet, but some authors say the idea originated from Adolf Hitler.

The Ju 87 B-2s that followed had some improvements and were built in several variants that included ski-equipped versions (the B-1 also had this modification), and at the other end, with a tropical operation kit called the Ju 87 B-2 trop. Italy's Regia Aeronautica received B-2s and named them the "Picchiatello", while others went to the other members of the Axis powers, including Hungary, Bulgaria, and Romania. The B-2 also had an oil hydraulic system for closing the cowling flaps: this continued in all the later designs.

Production of the Ju 87 B started in 1937. 89 B-1s were to be built at Junkers' factory in Dessau and another 40 at the Weserflug plant in Lemwerder by July 1937. Production would be carried out by the Weserflug company after April 1938, but Junkers continued producing Ju 87 up until March 1940.

=== Ju 87 R ===
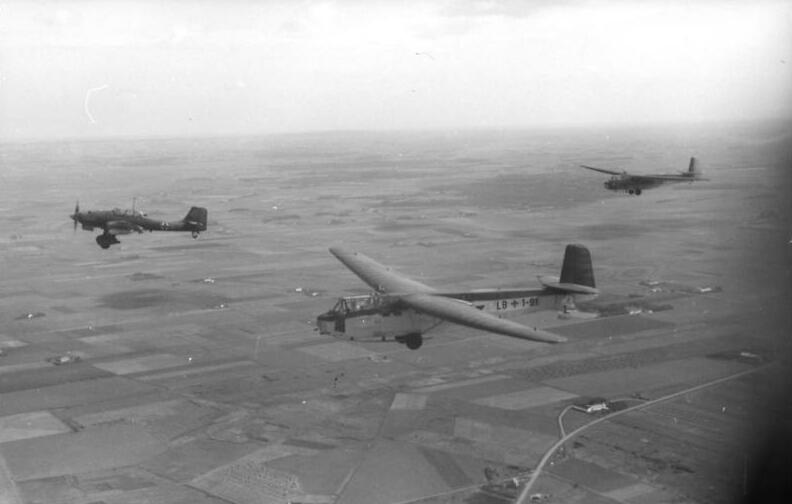
A Ju-87 towing a DFS 230 over Italy

A long range version of the Ju 87 B was also built, known as the Ju 87 R, the letter being an abbreviation for Reichweite, "(operational) range". They were primarily intended for anti-shipping missions. The Ju 87 R had a B-series airframe with an additional oil tank and fuel lines to the outer wing stations to permit the use of two 300 litres (79 US gal) standardised capacity under-wing drop tanks, used by a wide variety of Luftwaffe aircraft through most of the war. This increased fuel capacity to 1,080 litres (290 US gal) (500 litres in main fuel tank of which 480 litres were usable + 600 litres from drop tanks). To prevent overload conditions, bomb carrying ability was often restricted to a single 250 kg (550 lb) bomb if the aircraft was fully loaded with fuel.

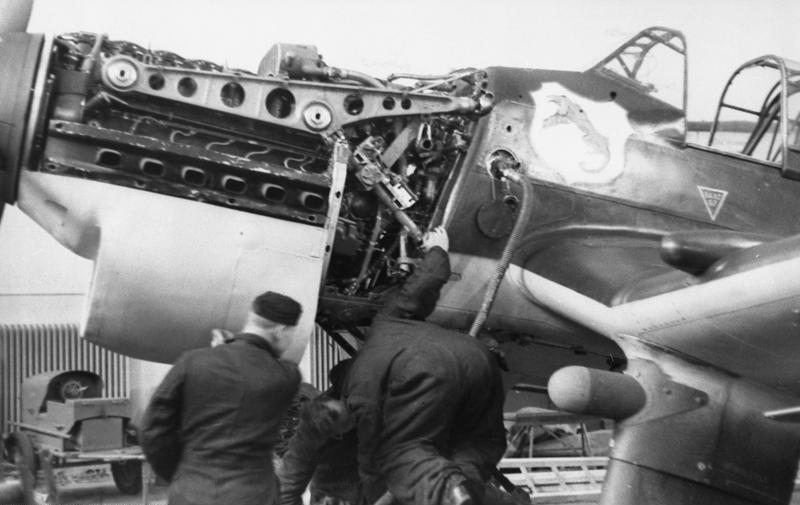
The powerplant; a Jumo 211D installed in a Ju 87 B – the "Lärmgerät" housing is faired over on the maingear leg

The Ju 87 R-1 had a B-1 airframe with the exception of a modification in the fuselage which enabled an additional oil tank. This was installed to feed the engine due to the increase in range with the extra fuel tanks.

The Ju 87 R-2 had the same airframe as the B-2, strengthened to ensure it could withstand dives of 600 km/h (370 mph). The Jumo 211D in-line engine was installed, replacing the R-1s Jumo 211A. Due to an increase in overall weight by 700 kg (1,500 lb), the Ju 87 R-2 was 30 km/h (19 mph) slower than the Ju 87 B-1 and had a lower service ceiling. The Ju 87 R-2 had an increased range advantage of 360 km (220 mi). The R-3 and R-4 were the last R variants developed, and only a few were built. The R-3 was an experimental tug for gliders and had an expanded radio system so the crew could communicate with the glider crew by way of the tow rope. The R-4 differed from the R-2 in the Jumo 211J powerplant.

=== Ju 87 C ===
On 18 August 1937, the RLM decided to introduce the Ju 87 Tr(C). The Ju 87 C was intended to be a dive and torpedo bomber for the Kriegsmarine (Navy of Nazi Germany). The type was ordered into prototype production and available for testing in January 1938. Testing was given two months and was to begin in February and end in April 1938. The prototype V10 was to be a fixed wing test aircraft, while the following V11 would be modified with folding wings. The prototypes were Ju 87 B-0 airframes powered by Jumo 211 A engines. Owing to delays, the V10 was not completed until March 1938. It first flew on 17 March and was designated Ju 87 C-1. On 12 May, the V11 also flew for the first time. By 15 December 1939, 915 arrested landings on dry land had been made. It was found that the arresting gear winch was too weak and had to be replaced. Tests showed the average braking distance was 20–35 metres (66–115 ft). The Ju 87 V11 was designated C-0 on 8 October 1938. It was fitted out with standard Ju 87 C-0 equipment and better wing-folding mechanisms. The "carrier Stuka" was to be built at the Weserflug Company's Lemwerder plant between April and July 1940.

Among the "special" equipment of the Ju 87 C was a two-seat rubber dinghy with a flare gun, signal ammunition and other emergency supplies. A quick fuel dump mechanism and two inflatable 750 L (200 US gal) bags in each wing and a further two 500 L (130 US gal) bags in the fuselage enabled the Ju 87 C to remain afloat for up to three days in calm seas. On 6 October 1939, with the war already underway, 120 of the planned Ju 87 Tr(C)s on order at that point were cancelled. Despite the cancellation, the tests continued using catapults. The Ju 87 C had a takeoff weight of 5,300 kg (11,700 lb) and a speed of 133 km/h (83 mph) on departure. The Ju 87 could be launched with a SC 500 kg (1,100 lb) bomb and four SC 50 kg (110 lb) bombs under the fuselage. The C-1 was to have two MG 17s mounted in the wing with a MG 15 operated by the rear gunner. On 18 May 1940, production of the C-1 was switched to the R-1.

=== Ju 87 D ===
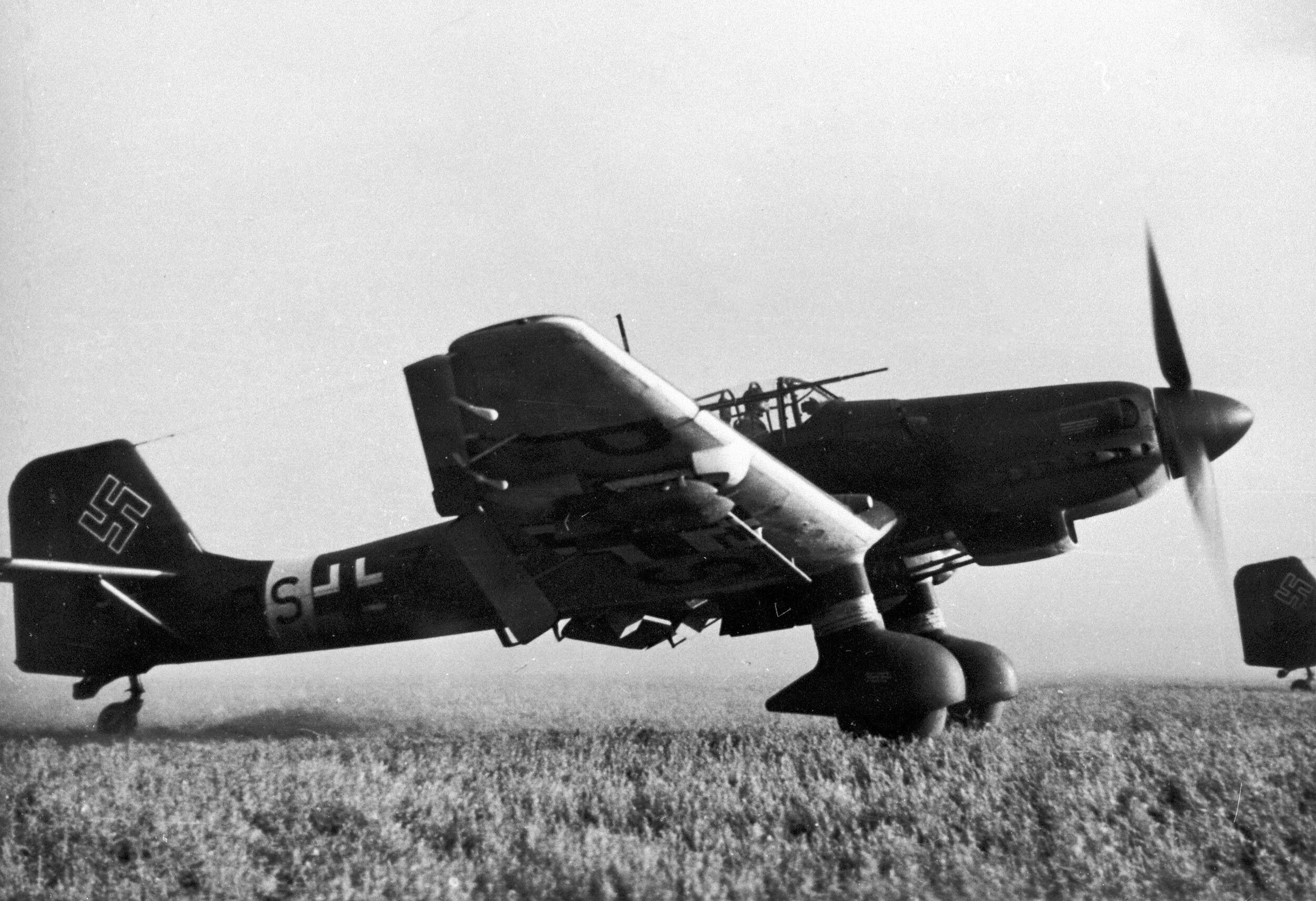
A Ju 87Ds following a landing with air brakes still deployed

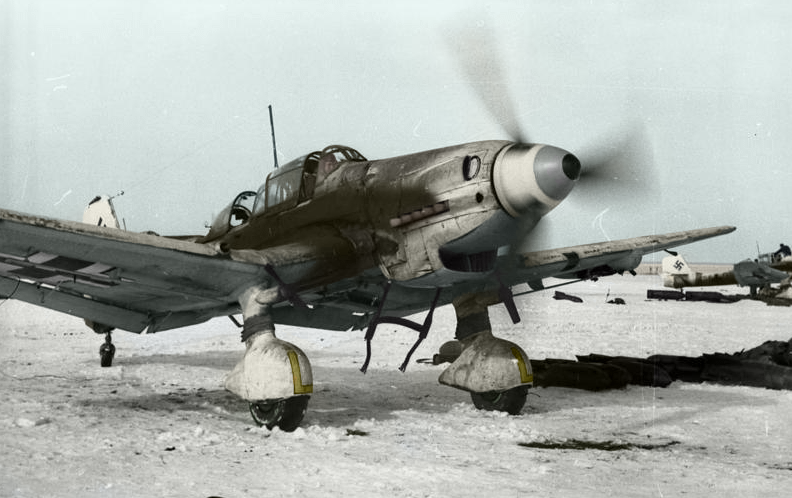
Ju 87Ds, Soviet Union, January/February 1943

Despite the Stuka's vulnerability to enemy fighters having been exposed during the Battle of Britain, the Luftwaffe had no choice but to continue its development, as there was no replacement aircraft in sight. The result was the D-series. In June 1941, the RLM ordered five prototypes, the Ju 87 V21–25. A Daimler-Benz DB 603 powerplant was to be installed in the Ju 87 D-1, but it did not have the power of the Jumo 211 and performed "poorly" during tests, so it was dropped. The Ju 87 D-series featured two coolant radiators underneath the inboard sections of the wings, while the oil cooler was relocated to the position formerly occupied by the single, undernose "chin" coolant radiator. The D-series also introduced an aerodynamically refined cockpit with better visibility and space. Armour protection was increased and a new dual-barrel 7.92 mm (.312 in) MG 81Z machine gun with an extremely high rate of fire was installed in the rear defensive position. Engine power was increased again, the Jumo 211J now delivering 1,420 PS (1,044 kW or 1,400 hp).

Bomb carrying ability was nearly quadrupled from 500 kg (1,100 lb) in the B-version to 1,800 kg (4,000 lb) in the D-version (max. load for short ranges, overload condition), a typical bomb load ranged from 500–1,200 kg (1,100–2,600 lb).

The internal fuel capacity of the Ju 87 D was raised to 800 L (of which 780 L were usable) by adding wing tanks while retaining the option to carry two 300 L drop tanks. Tests at Rechlin-Lärz Airfield revealed it made possible a flight duration of 2 hours and 15 minutes. With an extra two 300 L (80 US gal) fuel tanks, it could achieve four hours flight time.

The D-2 was a variant used as a glider tug by converting older D-series airframes. It was intended as the tropical version of the D-1 and had heavier armour to protect the crew from ground fire. The armour reduced its performance and caused the Oberkommando der Luftwaffe (Luftwaffe High Command) to "place no particular value on the production of the D-2". The D-3 was an improved D-1 with more armour for its ground-attack role. Some Ju 87 D-3s were designated D-3N or D-3 trop and fitted with night or tropical equipment. The D-4 designation applied to a prototype torpedo-bomber version, which could carry a 750–905 kg (1,653–1,995 lb) aerial torpedo on a PVC 1006 B rack—this setup would have had the capacity to carry the Luftorpedo LT 850, the German version of the well-proven Japanese Type 91 aerial torpedo of 848 kg (1,870 lb). The D-4 was to be converted from D-3 airframes and, in place of the carrier-specific Ju 87C series designs, operated from the aircraft carrier Graf Zeppelin. Other modifications included a flame eliminator and, unlike earlier D variants, two 20 mm MG 151/20 cannon, while the radio operator/rear gunner's ammunition supply was increased by 1,000 to 2,000 rounds.

The Ju 87 D-5 was based on the D-3 design and was unique in the Ju 87 series as it had wings 0.6 metres (2 ft) longer than previous variants. The two 7.92 mm MG 17 wing guns were exchanged for more powerful 20 mm MG 151/20s to better suit the aircraft's ground-attack role. The window in the floor of the cockpit was reinforced and four, rather than the previous three, aileron hinges were installed. Higher diving speeds were obtained of 650 km/h (400 mph) up to 2,000 m (6,600 ft). The range was recorded as 715 km (444 mi) at ground level and 835 km (519 mi) at 5,000 m (16,000 ft).

The D-6, according to "Operating instructions, works document 2097", was built in limited numbers to train pilots on "rationalised versions"; due to shortages in raw materials, it did not go into mass production. The D-7 was another ground attack aircraft based on D-1 airframes upgraded to D-5 standard (armour, wing cannons, extended wing panels), while the D-8 was similar to the D-7 but based on D-3 airframes. The D-7 and D-8 were both were fitted with exhaust flame dampers and could conduct night operations.

Production of the D-1 variant started in 1941 with 495 ordered. These aircraft were delivered between May 1941 and March 1942. The RLM wanted 832 machines produced from February 1941, and the Weserflug company was tasked with their production. From June to September 1941, 40 Ju 87 Ds were expected to be built, increasing to 90 thereafter. Various production problems were encountered. One of the planned 48 was produced in July. Of the 25 the RLM hoped for in August 1941, none were delivered. In September, the first two of the planned 102 Ju 87s came off the production lines. The shortfalls continued to the end of 1941. During this time, the WFG plant in Lemwerder moved production to Berlin. Over 165 Ju 87s had not been delivered, and production was only 23 Ju 87 Ds per month out of the 40 expected. By the spring of 1942 to the end of production in 1944, 3,300 Ju 87s, mostly D-1s, D-3s and D-5s had been manufactured.

In January 1943, a variety of Ju 87 Ds became "test beds" for the Ju 87 G variants. At the start of 1943, the coastal Luftwaffe Erprobungsstelle test centre at Tarnewitz tested this combination from a static position. Oberst G. Wolfgang Vorwald noted the experiments were not successful and suggested the cannon be installed on the Messerschmitt Me 410. Testing continued, and on 31 January 1943, Ju 87 D-1 W.Nr 2552 was tested by Hauptmann Hans-Karl Stepp near the Bryansk training area. Stepp noted the increase in drag, which reduced the aircraft's speed to 259 km/h (161 mph). Stepp also noted that the aircraft was less agile than the existing D variants. D-1 and D-3 variants operated in combat with the 37 mm (1.5 in) BK 37 cannon in 1943.

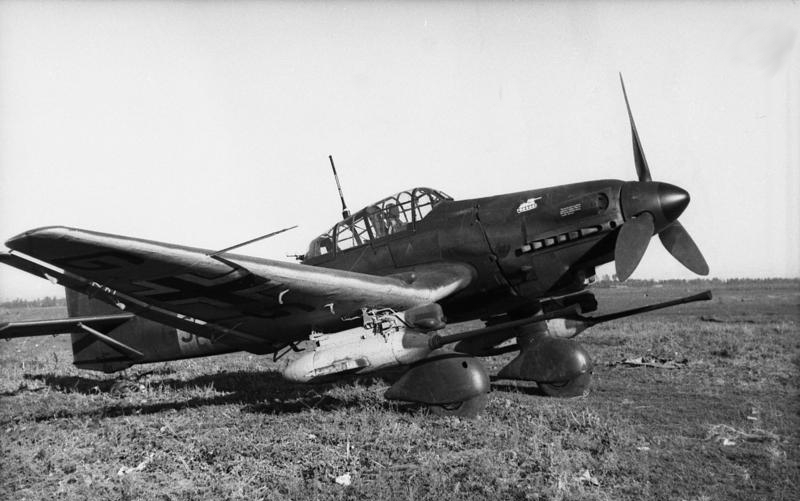
Ju 87 G-1 "Kanonenvogel" with its twin Bordkanone 3.7 cm (1.46 in) underwing gun pods

=== Ju 87 G ===
With the G variant, the ageing airframe of the Ju 87 found new life as an anti-tank aircraft: this was the final operational version of the Stuka and was deployed on the Eastern Front. The reversal in German military fortunes after 1943 and the appearance of huge numbers of well-armoured Soviet tanks caused Junkers to adapt the existing design to combat this new threat. The Henschel Hs 129 had proved a potent ground attack weapon, but its large fuel tanks made it vulnerable to enemy fire, prompting the RLM to say, "that in the shortest possible time a replacement of the Hs 129 type must take place." With Soviet tanks being the priority targets, the development of a further variant as a successor to the Ju 87D began in November 1942. On 3 November, Milch raised the question of replacing the Ju 87 or redesigning it altogether. It was decided to keep the design as it was, but the power-plant was upgraded to a Junkers Jumo 211J, and two 37 mm (1.5 in) cannons were added. The variant was also designed to carry a 1,000 kg (2,200 lb) free-fall bomb load. Furthermore, the armoured protection of the Ilyushin Il-2 Sturmovik (Note: a feature pioneered by the 1916–17 origin Junkers J.I all-metal sesquiplane of World War I Imperial Germany's Luftstreitkräfte) was copied to protect the crew from ground fire now that the Ju 87 would be required to conduct low level attacks.

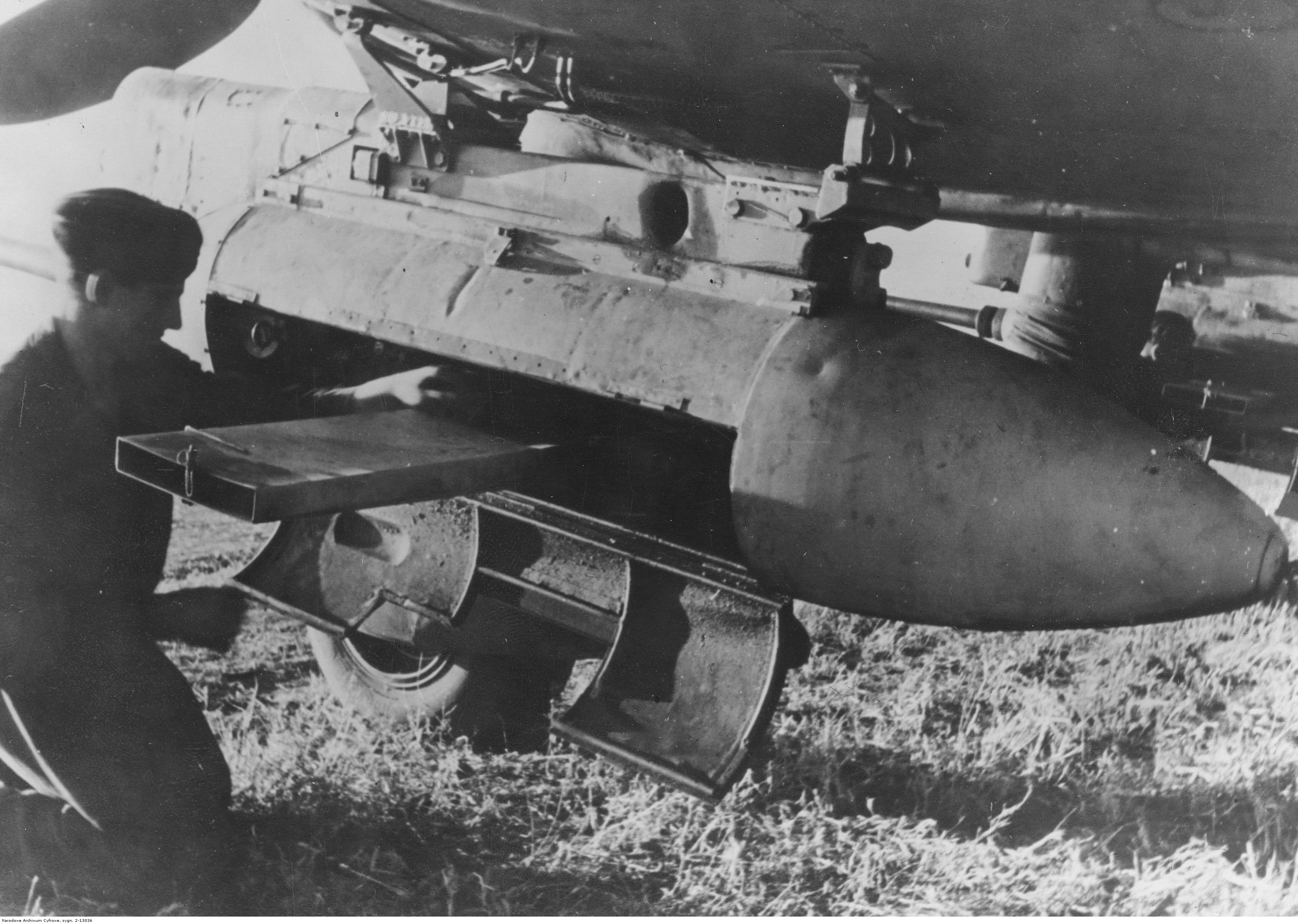
A technician servicing the 3.7 cm gun pod. The barrel can be seen near the left border of the photo.

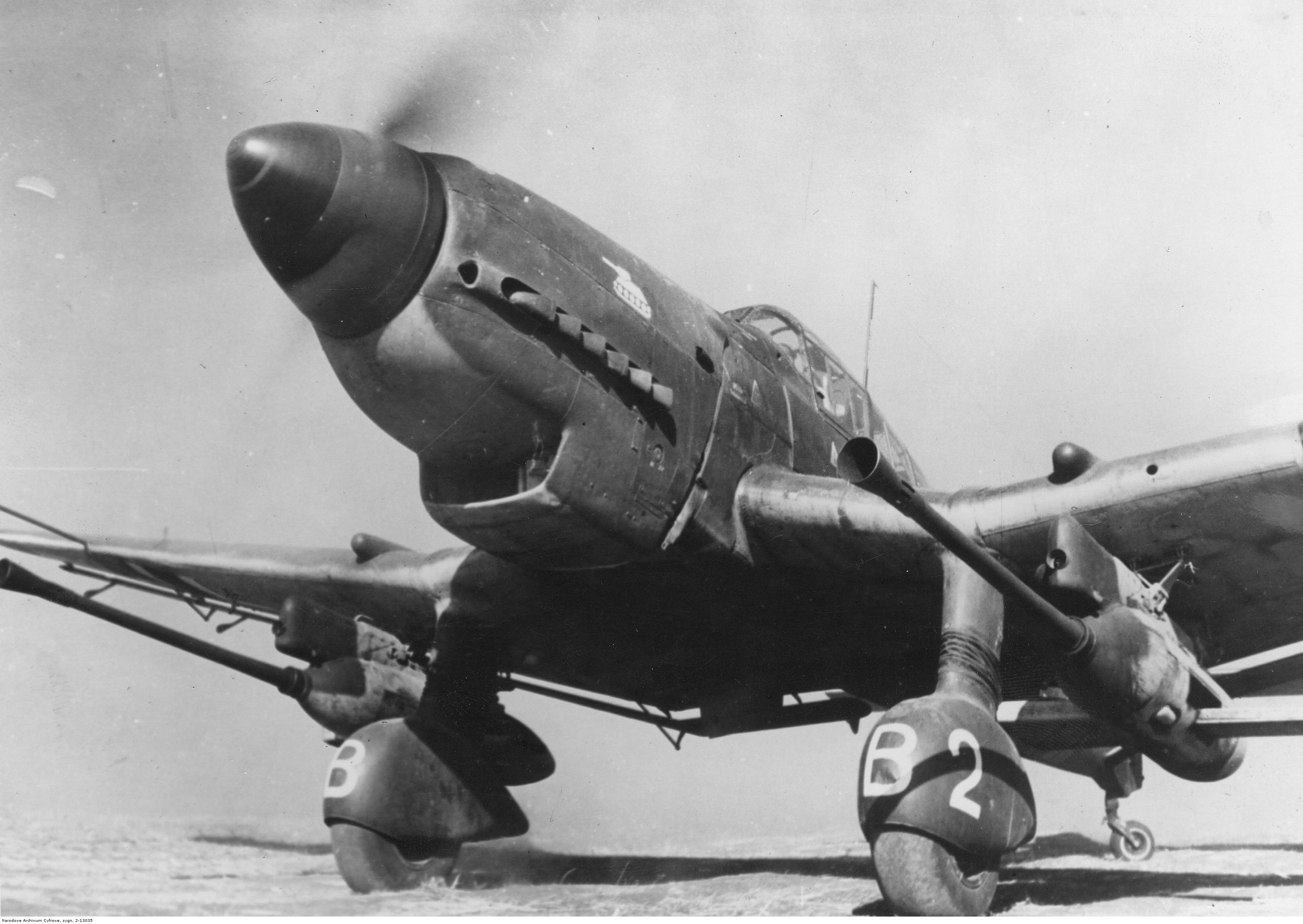
Hans-Ulrich Rudel's Ju 87 G-1 in May 1944

Hans-Ulrich Rudel, a Stuka ace, had suggested using two 37 mm (1.46 in) Flak 18 guns, each one in a self-contained under-wing gun pod, as the Bordkanone BK 3,7, after achieving success against Soviet tanks with the 20 mm MG 151/20 cannon. These gun pods were fitted to a Ju 87 D-1, W.Nr 2552. The first flight of the machine took place on 31 January 1943, piloted by Stepp. The continuing problems with about two dozen of the Ju 88P-1 and slow development of the Henschel Hs 129 B-3, both designs using the large, 7.5 cm Pak 40-based, autoloading Bordkanone 7,5 7.5 cm (2.95 in) cannon in a conformal gun pod beneath the fuselage, meant the Ju 87G was put into production. In April 1943, the first production Ju 87 G-1s were delivered to front line units. The two 37 mm (1.46 in) Bordkanone BK 3,7 cannons were mounted in under-wing gun pods, each loaded with two six-round magazines of armour-piercing tungsten carbide-cored ammunition. With these weapons, the Kanonenvogel ("cannon-bird"), as it was nicknamed, proved very successful in the hands of Stuka aces such as Rudel.

The G-1 was converted from older D-series airframes, retaining the smaller wing, but without the dive brakes. The G-2 was similar to the G-1 except for use of the extended wing of the D-5. 208 G-2s were built and at least a further 22 more were converted from D-3 airframes. Only a handful of production Gs were committed in the Battle of Kursk. On the opening day of the offensive, Hans-Ulrich Rudel flew the only "official" Ju 87 G, although a significant number of Ju 87 D variants were fitted with the 37 mm (1.46 in) cannon, and operated as unofficial Ju 87 Gs before the battle. In June 1943, the RLM ordered 20 Ju 87Gs as production variants.

=== Night-harassment variants ===
The Ju 87 had been used in the night intruder role in 1940 and 1941 during The Blitz, but the Soviet Air Force practice of harassing German ground forces using antiquated Polikarpov Po-2 and R-5 biplanes at night to drop flares and fragmentation bombs, inspired the Luftwaffe to form its own Störkampfstaffeln (harassment squadrons). On 23 July 1942, Junkers offered the Ju 87 B-2, R-2 and R-4s with Flammenvernichter ("flame eliminators"). On 10 November 1943, the RLM GL/C-E2 Division finally authorised the design in directive No. 1117.

The need to equip night units and the phasing out of Ju 87s from ground attack groups in favour of the Fw 190, enabled the use of D-5 airframes awaiting repair and D-7 and 8s already in conversion units. The latter variants were either conversions or modified D-1 and D-3 air frames. Adding the necessary equipment (radios and dampeners) was a requirement regardless of whether the aircraft was a production D-5 or a D-1 or 3 that had undergone wing changes. The change in designations due to conversions was not readily apparent, since the serial number and designation was applied to the fuselage by the manufacturer, which remained unaltered by wing changes. Some sub-contractors added an "N" designation (Nacht) for clarity on D-3 and 5s. Others added the roman numeral VII to the D-7s, perhaps to reflect that the aircraft was fitted with the FuG 7 radio. A great deal of confusion exists concerning the D-7; its existence has been questioned, but the type is listed in Junkers company records and in the Der Reichsminister der Luftfahrt and Oberbefehlshaber der Luftwaffe Technisches Amt. There was no production "nacht stuka", however, and modifications could vary according to the sub-contractor and depending on what parts were available.

A Stuka repair centre was set up at Wels-Lichtenegg. From May 1940 to November 1944, 746 were repaired and flight-tested there. In the winter 1943/44, the Metal Works Lower Saxony Brinckmann und Mergell company (Menibum) converted approximately 300 Ju 87D-3 and 5s to night versions. Dive-brakes were removed there, while gun muzzles and dampers were installed to eliminate exhaust and muzzle flash. The Jumo 211P engine was installed in some cases. It took 2,170 technicians and workers to carry out the conversions. Total figures for conversions to night flying operations are unknown. The company's equipment was seized by the Soviet Union at the end of the war, and the records were lost or destroyed. A main piece of equipment, hereto not installed in the Ju 87, was the FuG 101 Electronic Radio Altimeter: this was used to measure height. Some Ju 87s also used FuG 16Z transmitter/receiver set to augment the FuG 25 IFF (Identification Friend or Foe).

Pilots were asked to complete the new "Blind Flying Certificate 3", which was especially introduced for this new type of operation. Pilots were trained at night, over unfamiliar terrain, and forced to rely on their instruments for direction. The Ju 87's standard Revi C12D gunsight was replaced with the new Nachtrevi ("Night revi") C12N. On some Ju 87s, the Revi 16D was exchanged for the Nachtrevi 16D. To help the pilot see his instrument panel, a violet light was installed.

On 15 November 1942, the Auxiliary Staffel was created. By mid-1943, Luftflotte 1 was given four Staffeln while Luftflotte 4 and Luftwaffe Kommando Ost (Luftwaffe Command East) were given six and two respectively. In the first half of 1943, 12 Nachtschlachtgruppen ("night battle groups"—NSGr) had been formed, flying a multitude of different types of aircraft, including the Ju 87, which proved itself ideally suited to the low-level slow flying needed. NSGr 1 and 2 fought with some success on the Western Front during the Battle of Normandy and Battle of the Bulge. NSGr 7 operated in "anti-partisan" role from bases in Albania from July 1944, replacing their use of German trainers. The 3rd and 4th group served on the Eastern Front, the 8th in the Arctic and the 9th in Italy. NSGr 20 fought against the Western Allied invasion of Germany in 1945. Photographic evidence exists of 16 NSGr 20 Ju 87s lining up to take-off in the woods circling the Lippe airfield, Germany while under attack from Republic P-47 Thunderbolts of the United States Army Air Forces (USAAF) IX Tactical Air Command. The unit operated against the Ludendorff Bridge during the Battle of Remagen.

== Production ==
Despite initial production issues with the Ju 87, the RLM ordered 216 Ju 87 A-1s into production and wanted to receive delivery of all machines between January 1936 and 1938. The Junkers production capacity was fully occupied, and licensing to other production facilities became necessary. The first 35 Ju 87 A-1s were therefore produced by the Weser Flugzeugbau (WFG). By 1 September 1939, 360 Ju 87 As and Bs had been built by the Junkers factories at Dessau and Weserflug factory in Lemwerder near Bremen. By 30 September 1939, Junkers had received 2,365,196 Reichsmark (RM) for Ju 87 construction orders. The RLM paid another 243,646 RM for development orders. According to audit records in Berlin, by the end of the financial year on 30 September 1941, 3,059,000 RM had been spent on Ju 87 airframes. By 30 June 1940, 697 Ju 87 B-1s and 129 B-2s alone had been produced. Another 105 R-1s and seven R-2s had been built.

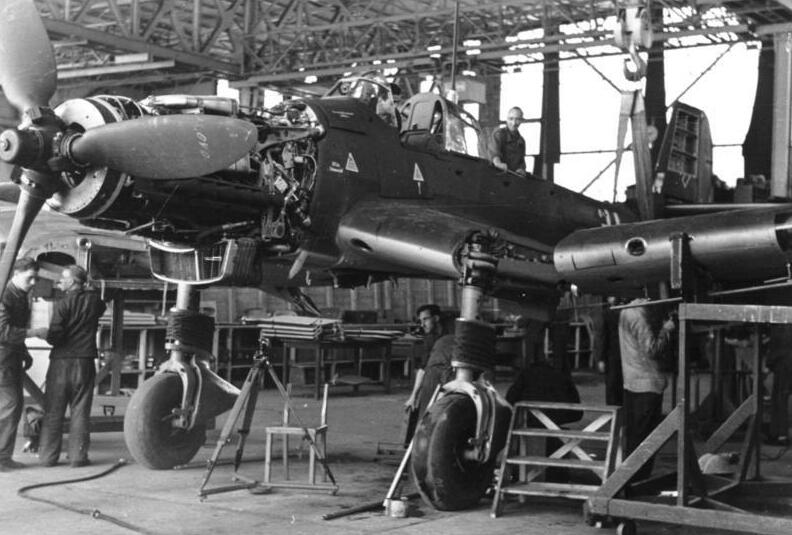
A Ju 87D during wing installation

The range of the B-2 was insufficient and was dropped in favor of the Ju 87 R long-range versions in the second half of 1940. The 105 R-1s were converted to R-2 status and a further 616 production R-2s were ordered. In May 1941, the development of the D-1 was planned and was ordered into production by March 1942. The expansion of the Ju 88 production lines to compensate for the withdrawal of Dornier Do 17 production delayed production of the Ju 87 D. The Weserflug plant in Lemwerder experienced production shortfalls; this prompted Milch to visit and threaten the company into meeting the RLM's Ju 87 D-1 requirements on 23 February 1942. To meet these demands, 700 skilled workers were needed. Skilled workers had been called up for military service in the Wehrmacht armed forces. Junkers were able to supply 300 German workers to the Weserflug factory, and as an interim solution, forced-labour was used from Soviet prisoners of war and Soviet civilians deported to Germany. Working around the clock, the shortfall was made good and WFG received an official commendation. By May 1942, demand increased further: Chief of Procurement General Walter Herthel found that each unit needed 100 Ju 87s as standard strength and an average of 20 per month to cover attrition. Not until June–December 1942 did production capacity increase, and 80 Ju 87s were produced per month.

By 17 August 1942, production had climbed rapidly after Blohm & Voss BV 138 production was scaled down and licence work had shut down at WFG. Production now reached 150 Ju 87 D airframes per month, but spare parts were failing to reach the same production levels. Undercarriage parts were in particularly short supply. Milch ordered production to 350 Ju 87s per month in September 1942. This was not achievable due to the insufficient production capacity in the Reich.

The RLM considered setting up production facilities in Slovakia, but this would delay production until the buildings and factories could be furnished with the machine tools. These tools were also in short supply, and the RLM hoped to purchase them from Switzerland and Italy. The Slovaks could provide 3,500–4,000 workers, but no technical personnel. The move would produce only another 25 machines per month at a time when demand was increasing. In October, production plans were dealt another blow when one of WFGs plants burned down, leaving a chronic shortage of tailwheels and undercarriage parts. Junkers director and member of the Luftwaffe industry council Carl Frytag reported that by January 1943 only 120 Ju 87s could be produced at Bremen and 230 at Berlin-Tempelhof.

=== Decline and end of production ===
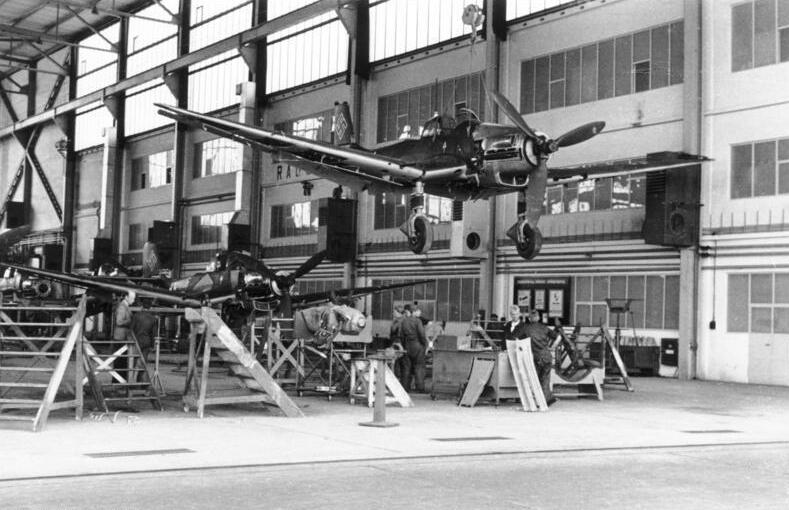
Two Junkers Ju 87 Ds near completion

After evaluating Ju 87 operations on the Eastern Front, Göring ordered production limited to 200 per month in total. General der Schlachtflieger ("General of Ground Attack") Ernst Kupfer decided continued development would "hardly bring any further tactical value". Adolf Galland, a fighter pilot with operational and combat experience in ground attack, said that abandoning development would be premature, but 150 machines per month would be sufficient.

On 28 July 1943, strike and bomber production was to be scaled down, and fighter and bomber destroyer production given priority. On 3 August 1943, Milch contradicted this and declared that this increase in fighter production would not affect production of the Ju 87, Ju 188, Ju 288, and Ju 290. This was an important consideration, as the life expectancy of a Ju 87 had been reduced (since 1941) from 9.5 months to 5.5 months to just 100 operational flying hours. On 26 October, Kupfer reported the Ju 87 could no longer survive in operations and that the Focke-Wulf Fw 190F should take its place. Milch finally agreed and ordered the minimal continuance of Ju 87 D-3 and D-5 production for a smooth transition period. In May 1944, production wound down: 78 Ju 87s were built in May and 69 rebuilt from damaged machines. In the next six months, 438 Ju 87 Ds and Gs were added to the Ju 87 force as new or repaired aircraft. It is unknown whether any Ju 87s were built from parts unofficially after December 1944 and the end of production.

Overall, 550 Ju 87 As and B2s were completed at the Junkers factory in Dessau. Production of the Ju 87 R and D variants was transferred to the Weserflug company, which produced 5,930 of the 6,500 Ju 87s produced in total. During the course of the war, little damage was done to the WFG plant at Lemwerder. Attacks throughout 1940-45 caused little lasting damage and succeeded only in damaging some Ju 87 airframes, in contrast to the Focke-Wulf plant in Bremen. At Berlin-Tempelhof, little delay or damage was caused to Ju 87 production, despite the heavy bombings and large-scale destruction inflicted on other targets. The WFG again went unscathed. The Junkers factory at Dessau was heavily attacked, but not until Ju 87 production had ceased. The Ju 87 repair facility at the Wels aircraft works was destroyed on 30 May 1944, and the site abandoned Ju 87 links.

== Operations in the Spanish Civil War ==
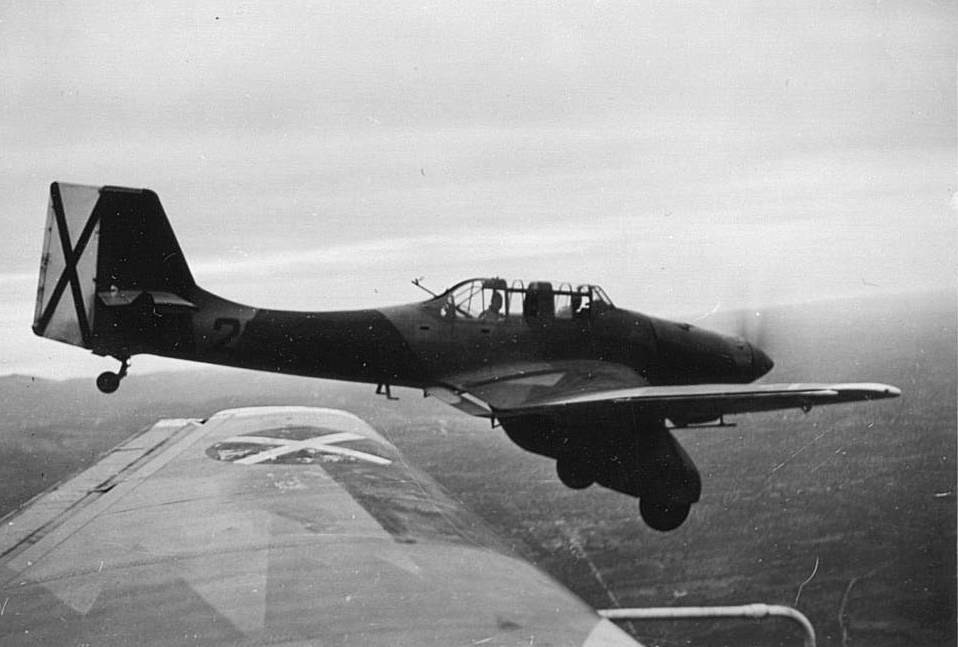
Condor Legion's Junkers Ju 87A with Spanish Nationalist markings

Among the many German aircraft designs that participated in the Condor Legion, and as part of other German involvement in the Spanish Civil War, a single Ju 87 A-0 (the V4 prototype) was allocated serial number 29-1 and assigned to the VJ/88, the experimental Staffel of the Legion's fighter wing. The aircraft was secretly loaded onto the ship Usaramo and departed Hamburg harbour on the night of 1 August 1936, arriving in Cádiz five days later. The only known information pertaining to its combat career in Spain is that it was piloted by Unteroffizier Herman Beuer, and took part in the Nationalist faction's offensive against Bilbao in 1937. Presumably, the aircraft was then secretly returned to Germany.

In January 1938, three Ju 87 As from the Legion Condor arrived. Several problems became evident. First, the spatted undercarriage sank into muddy airfield surfaces, so the spats were temporarily removed. Second, the maximum 500 kg (1,100 lb) bomb load could only be carried if the gunner vacated his seat, therefore the bomb load was restricted to 250 kg (550 lb). These aircraft supported the Nationalist forces and carried out anti-shipping missions until they returned to Germany in October 1938.

During the Catalonia Offensive in January 1939, the Junkers Ju 87 returned to Spain. On the morning of 21 January 1939, 34 Heinkel He 111, along with some escorts and three Ju 87B, attacked the Port of Barcelona, five days before the city was captured by the Nationalists. 29 Republican fighter aircraft were defending the city. There were more than 100 aircraft operating over the city and, while a Ju 87 was dive-bombing a ship, a Republican Polikarpov I-15 pilot, Francisco Alférez Jiménez, claimed it destroyed near El Vendrell, in Coma-ruga, but the Stuka was capable of landing on the beach without crashing. That was the only time a Stuka attacked the capital of Catalonia. On 24 January 1939, a group of Stukas prevented the destruction of a bridge near Barcelona by strafing the demolition engineers on Molins de Rei. During the attack, the Republican ground defenders, equipped with a quadruple PM M1910 mounting, hit pilot Heinz Bohne in both legs and the Stuka crashed, seriously injuring Bohne and his machine gunner, Albert Conrad: they were the only two Stuka casualties of the Spanish civil war.

As with the Ju 87 A-0, the B-1s were returned discreetly to the Reich. The experience of the Spanish Civil War proved invaluable—air and ground crews perfected their skills, and equipment was evaluated under combat conditions. However, the Ju 87 had not been tested against numerous and well-coordinated fighter opposition; this lesson was learned later at great cost to the Stuka crews.

== Operations in World War II ==
All Stuka units were moved to Germany's eastern border in preparation for the invasion of Poland. On the morning of 15 August 1939, during a mass-formation dive-bombing demonstration for high-ranking commanders of the Luftwaffe at Neuhammer training grounds near Sagan, 13 Ju 87s and 26 crew members were lost when they crashed into the ground almost simultaneously. The planes dived through clouds, expecting to release their practice bombs and pull out of the dive once below the cloud ceiling; however, they were unaware that the ceiling was too low and unexpected ground mist formed, leaving them no time to pull out of the dive.

=== Poland ===
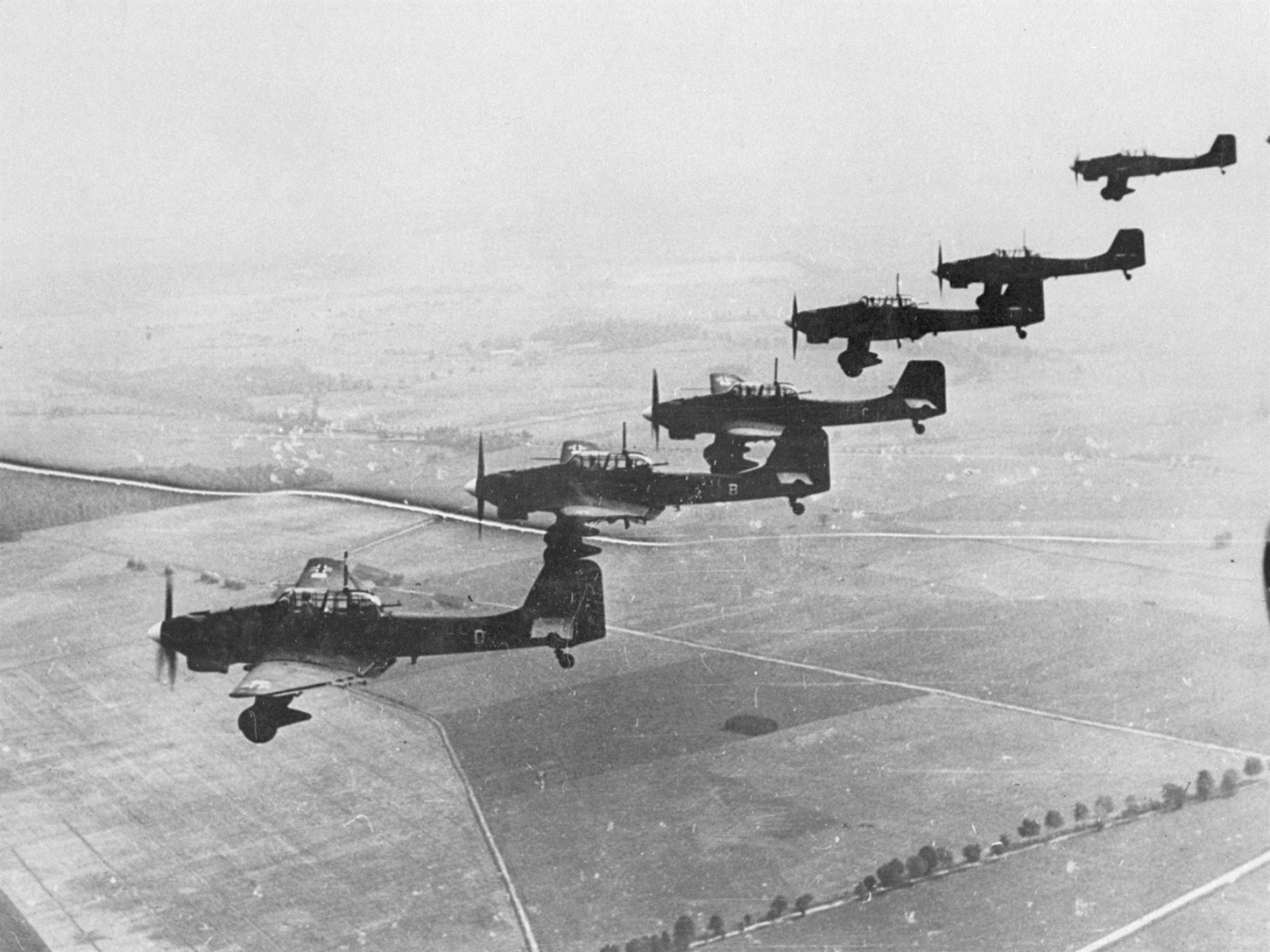
Ju 87 Bs over Poland, September/October 1939

On 1 September 1939, the Wehrmacht invaded Poland, beginning World War II. Generalquartiermeister der Luftwaffe records indicate a total force of 366 Ju 87 A and Bs were available for operations on 31 August 1939. The first Ju 87 operation was to destroy Polish demolition charges fixed to the rail bridges over the Vistula, that linked Eastern Germany to the Danzig corridor and East Prussia, as well as Polish Pomerania. To do this, Ju 87s were ordered to perform a low-level attack on the Polish Army Garrison headquarters. II. and III./StG 1 targeted the cables along the embankment, the electricity plant, and signal boxes at Dirschau (now Tczew). At exactly 04:26 CET, a Kette ("chain" or flight of three) of Ju 87s of 3./StG 1 led by Staffelkapitän Oberleutnant Bruno Dilley carried out the first bombing attack of the war. The Stukas attacked 11 minutes before the official German declaration of hostilities and hit the targets. The Ju 87s achieved complete success; however, the mission failed as the German Army delayed their advance, which allowed the Poles to carry out repairs and destroy all but one of the bridges before the Germans could reach them.

A Ju 87 achieved the first air victory during World War II on the morning of 1 September 1939, when Rottenführer Leutnant Frank Neubert of I./StG 2 "Immelmann" shot down a Polish PZL P.11c fighter while it was taking off from Balice airfield; its pilot, Captain Mieczysław Medwecki, was killed. In air-to-air combat, Ju 87 formations were well protected by German fighter aircraft and losses were light against the tenacious but short-lived opposition.

The Ju 87s reverted to ground attack missions for the campaign after the opening air attacks. Ju 87s were involved in the controversial but effective attacks at Wieluń. The lack of anti-aircraft artillery in the Polish Army magnified the impact of the Ju 87. At Piotrków Trybunalski, I./StG 76 and I./StG 2 destroyed a Polish infantry division de-training there. Troop trains were also easy targets: StG 77 destroyed one such target at Radomsko. During the Battle of Radom, six Polish divisions trapped by encircling German forces were forced to surrender after a relentless four-day bombardment by StG 51, 76 and 77; employed in this assault were 50 kg (110 lb) fragmentation bombs, which caused severe casualties to the Polish ground troops. The Stukas also participated in the Battle of Bzura which resulted in the breaking of Polish resistance. The dive bomber wings (Sturzkampfgeschwader) alone dropped 388 tonnes (428 tons) of bombs during this battle. During the Siege of Warsaw and the Battle of Modlin, the Ju 87 wings contributed to the defeat of well-entrenched and resolute Polish forces. IV(Stuka)./LG 1 was particularly effective in destroying the fortified Modlin.

The Luftwaffe had a few anti-shipping naval units such as 4.(St)/TrGr 186 to deal with Polish naval forces. This unit performed effectively, sinking the 1540-ton destroyer Wicher and the minelayer Gryf of the Polish Navy (both moored in a harbour). The torpedo boat Mazur (412 tons) was sunk at Oksywie; the gunboat General Haller (441 tons) was sunk in Hel Harbour on 6 September—during the Battle of Hel—along with the minesweeper Mewa (183 tons) and its sister ships Czapla and Jaskolka with several auxiliaries. The Polish naval units trapped in the Baltic were destroyed by Ju 87 operations. Once again, enemy air opposition was light, and the Stukawaffe (Stuka force) lost 31 aircraft during the campaign.

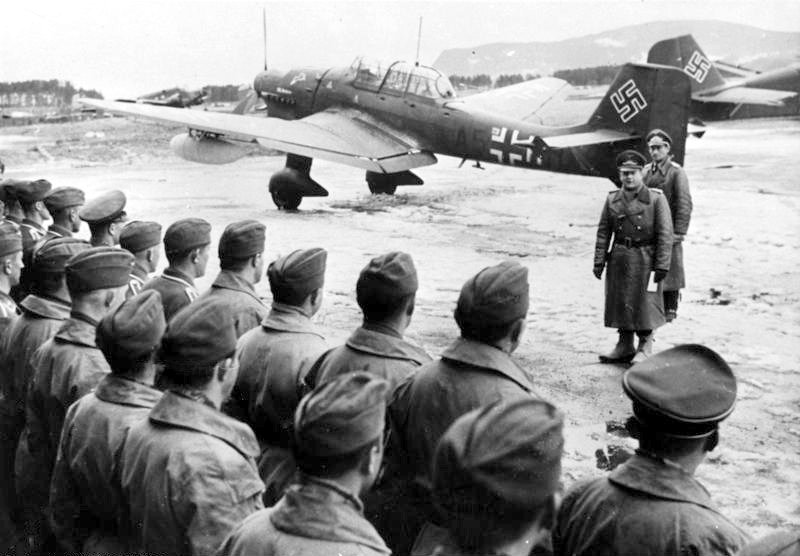
Erhard Milch addressing a Ju 87 staffel on a Norwegian airfield

=== Norway ===
Operation Weserübung began on 9 April 1940 with the invasions of Norway and Denmark. Denmark capitulated within the day; Norway continued to resist with British and French help. The campaign was not a Blitzkrieg of fast-moving armoured divisions supported by air power, as the mountainous terrain ruled out close Panzer/Stuka cooperation. Instead, the Germans relied on paratroops transported by Junkers Ju 52s and specialised ski troops. The Ju 87s were given the role of ground attack and anti-shipping missions; they proved to be the most effective weapon in the Luftwaffe's armoury carrying out the latter task.

On 9 April, the first Stukas took off at 10:59 from occupied airfields to destroy Oscarsborg Fortress, after the loss of the German cruiser Blücher, which disrupted the amphibious landings in Oslo through Oslofjord. The 22 Ju 87s had helped suppress the Norwegian defenders during the ensuing Battle of Drøbak Sound, but the defenders did not surrender until after Oslo had been captured. As a result, the German naval operation failed. StG 1 caught the 735 ton Norwegian destroyer Æger off Stavanger and hit the engine room: Æger was run aground and scuttled. The Stuka wings were now equipped with the new Ju 87 R, which differed from the Ju 87 B by having increased internal fuel capacity and two 300l underwing drop tanks for more range.

The Stukas had numerous successes against Allied naval vessels, and in particular the Royal Navy, which posed a formidable threat to German naval and coastal operations. The British heavy cruiser HMS Suffolk was attacked on 17 April; her stern was virtually destroyed but she limped back to Scapa Flow with 33 dead and 38 wounded crewmen. The light cruiser squadron consisting of the sister ships Curacoa and Curlew were subjected to lengthy attacks which badly damaged the former for one Ju 87 lost. A witness later said, "they threatened to take our masthead with them in every screaming nerve-racking dive". The same fate nearly befell the sloop Black Swan. On 27 April, a bomb passed through the quarterdeck, a wardroom, a water tank, and 4-inch (10.2 cm) ammunition magazine and out through the hull to explode in the fjord: the muffled explosion limited the damage to her hull. Black Swan fired 1,000 rounds, but failed to shoot down any of her attackers. The sloop HMS Bittern was sunk on 30 April. The French large destroyer Bison was sunk, along with HMS Afridi, by Sturzkampfgeschwader 1 on 3 May 1940 during the evacuation from Namsos. Bison's forward magazine was hit, killing 108 of the crew. Afridi, which had taken on some of Bison's survivors, was sunk in a later attack with the loss of 63 sailors. 49 officers and men, 13 soldiers and 33 survivors from Bison were lost aboard Afridi. All ships were targeted. Armed trawlers were used under the German air umbrella in an attempt to make smaller targets: such craft were not armoured or provided with anti-aircraft weapons. The Ju 87s demonstrated this on 30 April when they sank the Jardine (452 tons) and Warwickshire (466 tons). On 15 May, the Polish troopship Chrobry (11,442 tons) was sunk.

The Stukas also had an operational effect, even when little damage was done. On 1 May 1940, Vice Admiral Lionel Wells commanded a Home Fleet expedition of seven destroyers, the heavy cruiser Berwick, the aircraft carriers Glorious and Ark Royal, and the battleship Valiant. The carriers mounted fighter patrols over the ships evacuating troops from Andalsnes. The Stuka waves (accompanied by He 111s) achieved several near misses, but were unable to obtain a hit. Nevertheless, Wells ordered that no ship was to operate within range of the Ju 87s' Norwegian airfields. The Ju 87s had, in effect, driven British sea power from the Norwegian coast. Moreover, Victor reported to the Commander-in-Chief of the Home Fleet, Admiral Charles Forbes, that carrier operations were no longer practical under the current conditions.

In the following weeks, StG 1 continued their sea operations. Off Namsos on 5 May 1940, they caught and sank the Royal Norwegian Navy transports Aafjord (335 tons) and Blaafjeld (1,146 tons). The Ju 87s then took to bombing the town and the airstrip to support the German forces under the command of Eduard Dietl. The town fell in the first week of May. In the remaining four weeks of the campaign in Norway, the Ju 87s supported German forces in containing the Allied land forces in Narvik until they withdrew in early June.

=== France and the Low Countries ===
The Ju 87 units had learned lessons from the Polish and Norwegian campaigns. The failures in Poland, and of the Stukas of I./StG 1 to silence the Oscarsborg fort, ensured even more attention was paid to pin-point bombing during the Phoney War period. This was to pay off in the Western campaign.

When Fall Gelb (Case Yellow) began on 10 May 1940, the Stuka helped to swiftly neutralise Fort Ében-Émael in Belgium. The headquarters of the commander responsible for ordering the destruction of the Belgian Army-held bridges along the Albert Canal was stationed in the village of Lanaken (14 km/8.7 mi to the north). The Stuka demonstrated its accuracy when the small building was destroyed by four direct hits. As a result, only one of the three bridges was destroyed, allowing the German Army to rapidly advance in the opening days of the Belgian campaign. The Ju 87 proved to be a useful asset to Army Group B in the Low Countries; in pitched battles against French armoured forces at Hannut and Gembloux, Ju 87s effectively neutralised artillery and armour.

The Ju 87s also assisted German forces in the Battle of the Netherlands. The Dutch Navy in concert with the British were evacuating the Dutch royal family and Dutch gold reserves through the country's ports. Ju 87s sank the Dutch ships Van Galen (1,316 tons) and Johan Maurits van Nassau (1,520 tons) as they provided close-shore artillery support at Waalhaven and the Afsluitdijk. The British Valentine was crippled, beached and scuttled, while Winchester, Whitley, and Westminster were damaged. Whitley was later beached and scuttled after an air attack on 19 May.

The Ju 87 units were also instrumental in the Battle of France; it was here that most of the Ju 87-equipped units were concentrated. They assisted in the breakthrough at Sedan, the critical and first major land battle of the war on French territory. The Stukawaffe flew 300 sorties against French positions, with StG 77 alone flying 201 individual missions. The Ju 87s benefited from heavy fighter protection from Messerschmitt Bf 109 units. When resistance was organised, the Ju 87s could be vulnerable; for example, on 12 May, near Sedan, six French Curtiss H-75s from Groupe de Chasse I/5 (Group Interception) attacked a formation of Ju 87s, claiming 11 out of 12 unescorted Ju 87s without loss (the Germans recorded six losses over Sedan entire). For the most part, Allied opposition was disorganised. During the battles of Montcornet, Arras, Bolougne, and Calais, Ju 87 operations broke up counterattacks and offered pin-point aerial artillery support for German infantry.

The Luftwaffe benefited from excellent ground-to-air communications throughout the campaign. Radio-equipped forward liaison officers could call upon the Stukas and direct them to attack enemy positions along the axis of advance. In some cases, the Stukas responded in 10–20 minutes. Oberstleutnant Hans Seidemann (Richthofen's Chief of Staff) said that "never again was such a smoothly functioning system for discussing and planning joint operations achieved."

During the Battle of Dunkirk, many Allied ships were lost to Ju 87 attacks while evacuating British and French troops. The French destroyer L'Adroit was sunk on 21 May 1940, followed by the paddle steamer Crested Eagle on 28 May. The French Channel-steamer Côte d'Arzur (3,047 tons) followed. The Ju 87s operated to maximum effectiveness when the weather allowed. RAF fighter units were held back and Allied air cover was patchy at best. On 29 May, the Royal Navy destroyer HMS Grenade was severely damaged by a Ju 87 attack within Dunkirk's harbour, and subsequently sank. The French destroyer Mistral was crippled by bomb damage the same day. Jaguar and Verity were badly damaged while the trawlers Calvi and Polly Johnson (363 and 290 tons) disintegrated under bombardment. The merchant ship Fenella (2,376 tons) was sunk, having taken on 600 soldiers. The attacks brought the evacuation to a halt for a time. The ferries Lorina and Normannia (1,564 and 1,567 tons) were sunk also. By 29 May, the Allies had lost 31 vessels sunk and 11 were damaged. On 1 June, the Ju 87s sank the Halcyon-class minesweeper Skipjack, while the destroyer Keith was sunk and Basilisk was crippled before being scuttled by Whitehall. Whitehall was later badly damaged and along with Ivanhoe staggered back to Dover. Havant, commissioned for just three weeks, was sunk, and in the evening the French destroyer Foudroyant sank after a mass-attack. Further victories against shipping were claimed before nightfall on 1 June. The steamer Pavon was lost while carrying 1,500 Dutch soldiers, most of whom were killed. The oil tanker Niger was also destroyed. A flotilla of French minesweepers were also lost—Denis Papin (264 tons), the Le Moussaillon (380 tons), and Venus (264 tons).

In total, 89 merchantmen (of 126,518 grt) were lost, and of 40 RN destroyers used in the battle, eight were sunk (one to an E-boat and one to a submarine), and a further 23 were damaged and out of service. The campaign ended after the French surrender on 25 June 1940. Allied air power had been ineffective and disorganised, and as a result, Stuka losses were mainly due to ground fire. 120 machines, one-third of the Stuka force, were destroyed or damaged by all causes from 10 May to 25 June 1940.

=== Battle of Britain ===
For the Battle of Britain, the Luftwaffe's order of battle included bomber wings equipped with the Ju 87. Lehrgeschwader 2's IV.(St), Sturzkampfgeschwader 1's III. Gruppe and Sturzkampfgeschwader 2's III. Gruppe, Sturzkampfgeschwader 51 and Sturzkampfgeschwader 3's I. Gruppe were committed to the battle. As an anti-shipping weapon, the Ju 87 proved a potent weapon in the early stages of the battle. On 4 July 1940, StG 2 made a successful attack on a convoy in the English Channel, sinking four freighters: Britsum, Dallas City, Deucalion and Kolga. Six more were damaged. That afternoon, 33 Ju 87s delivered the single most deadly air assault on British territory in history, when 33 Ju 87s of III./StG 51, avoiding Royal Air Force (RAF) interception, sank the 5,500 ton anti-aircraft ship HMS Foylebank in Portland Harbour, killing 176 of its 298 crew. One of Foylebank's gunners, Leading Seaman John F. Mantle continued to fire on the Stukas as the ship sank. He was awarded a posthumous Victoria Cross for remaining at his post despite being mortally wounded. Mantle may have been responsible for the single Ju 87 lost during the raid.

During August, the Ju 87s also had some success. On 13 August, the opening of the main German attacks on airfields took place; it was known to the Luftwaffe as Adlertag ("Eagle Day"). Bf 109s of Jagdgeschwader 26 (JG 26) were sent out in advance of the main strike and drew off RAF fighters, allowing 86 Ju 87s of StG 1 to attack RAF Detling in Kent unhindered. The attack killed the station commander, destroyed 20 RAF aircraft on the ground and a great many of the airfield's buildings. Detling was not an RAF Fighter Command station.

The Battle of Britain proved for the first time that the Junkers Ju 87 was vulnerable in hostile skies against well-organised and determined fighter opposition. The Ju 87, like other dive bombers, was slow and possessed inadequate defences. Furthermore, it could not be effectively protected by fighters because of its low speed and the very low altitudes at which it ended its dive bomb attacks. The Stuka depended on air superiority, the very thing being contested over Britain. It was withdrawn from attacks on Britain in August after prohibitive losses, leaving the Luftwaffe without precision ground-attack aircraft.

Steady losses had occurred throughout their participation in the battle. On 18 August, known as the Hardest Day because both sides suffered heavy losses, the Stuka was withdrawn after 16 were destroyed and many others damaged. According to the Generalquartiermeister der Luftwaffe, 59 Stukas had been destroyed and 33 damaged to varying degrees in six weeks of operations. Over 20% of the total Stuka strength had been lost between 8 and 18 August; and the myth of the Stuka shattered. The Ju 87s did succeed in sinking six warships, 14 merchant ships, badly damaging seven airfields and three Chain Home radar stations, and destroying 49 British aircraft, mainly on the ground.

On 19 August, the units of VIII. Fliegerkorps moved up from their bases around Cherbourg-Octeville and concentrated in the Pas de Calais under Luftflotte 2, closer to the area of the proposed invasion of Britain. On 13 September, the Luftwaffe targeted airfields again, with a small number of Ju 87s crossing the coast at Selsey and heading for Tangmere. After a lull, anti-shipping operations attacks were resumed by some Ju 87 units from 1 November 1940 as part of the new winter tactic of enforcing a blockade. Over the next 10 days, seven merchant ships were sunk or damaged, mainly in the Thames Estuary, for the loss of four Ju 87s. On 14 November 19, Stukas from III./St.G 1 with escort drawn from JG 26 and JG 51 went out against another convoy; as no targets were found over the estuary, the Stukas attacked Dover, their alternative target.

Bad weather resulted in a decline of anti-shipping operations, and before long the Ju 87 groups began re-deploying to Poland, as part of the concealed build-up for Operation Barbarossa. By spring 1941, only St.G 1 with 30 Ju 87s remained facing the United Kingdom. Operations on a small scale continued throughout the winter months into March. Targets included ships at sea, the Thames Estuary, the Chatham naval dockyard, and Dover and night-bomber sorties made over the Channel. These attacks were resumed the following winter.

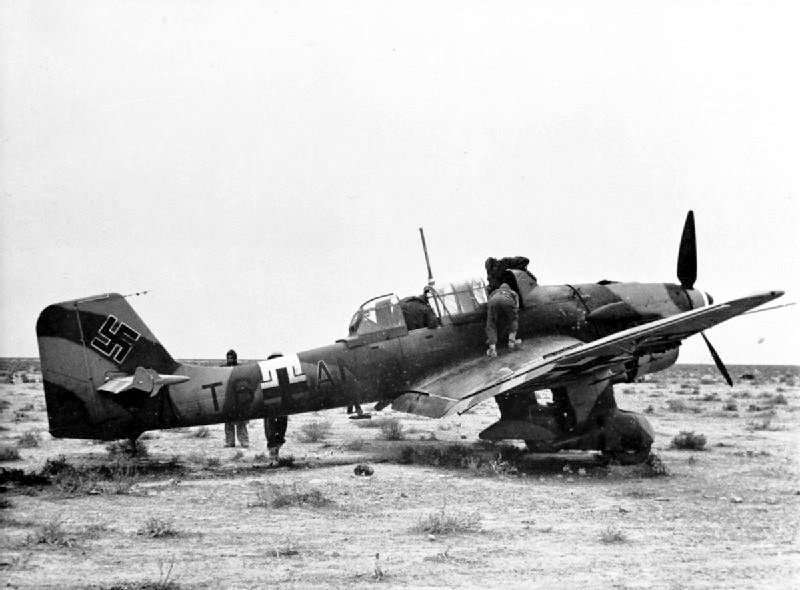
A Ju 87 B of 5/StG 2 is examined by British troops after making an emergency landing in the North African desert, December 1941.

=== North Africa and the Mediterranean ===
After the Italian defeats in the Italo-Greek War and Operation Compass in North Africa, the Oberkommando der Wehrmacht ordered the deployment of German forces to these theatres. Amongst the Luftwaffe contingent deployed was the command unit StG 3, which touched down in Sicily in December 1940. In the next few days, two groups—80 Stukas—were deployed under X. Fliegerkorps.

The first task of the Korps was to attack British shipping passing between Sicily and Africa, in particular the convoys aimed at re-supplying Malta. The Ju 87s first made their presence felt by subjecting the British aircraft carrier HMS Illustrious to heavy attack. The crews were confident they could sink it, as the flight deck had an area of about 6,500 m^{2} (70,000 sq ft). On 10 January 1941, the Stuka crews were told that four direct hits with 500 kg (1,100 lb) bombs would be enough to sink the carrier. The Ju 87s delivered six, and three damaging near-misses, but the ship's engines were untouched and she reached the besieged harbour of Malta.

The Regia Aeronautica was equipped for a while with the Stukas. In 1939, the Italian government asked the RLM to supply 100 Ju 87s. Italian pilots were sent to Graz in Austria to be trained for dive-bombing aircraft. In the spring of 1940, between 72 and 108 Ju 87 B-1s, some of them ex-Luftwaffe aircraft, were delivered to 96° Gruppo Bombardamento a Tuffo. The Italian Stuka, renamed Picchiatello, was in turn assigned to Gruppi 97°, 101° and 102°. The Picchiatelli were used against Malta, Allied convoys in the Mediterranean, and in North Africa (where they took part in conquering Tobruk). They were used by the Regia Aeronautica up to 1942.

Some of the Picchiatelli saw action in the opening phase of the Italian invasion of Greece in October 1940. Their numbers were low and ineffective in comparison to German operations, and the Italian forces were quickly pushed back. By early 1941, the Greeks had pushed into Italian-occupied Albania. Once again, Hitler decided to send military aid to his ally. Before the Luftwaffe could intervene, the Italian Ju 87s achieved some successes. 97 Gruppo (group) and its 239 Squadriglia (squadron) sinking the Hellenic Navy freighter Susanah off Corfu on 4 April 1941, while the torpedo boat Proussa was sunk later in the day. On 21 April, the Greek freighter Ioanna was sunk, and they accounted for the British tanker Hekla off Tobruk on 25 May, then the Royal Australian Navy destroyer Waterhen on 20 June. The British gunboat Cricket and supply submarine Cachalot became victims: the former was crippled and later sunk by Italian warships.

In March, the pro-German Yugoslav government was overthrown in a coup. A furious Hitler ordered the attack to be expanded to include Yugoslavia. Operation Marita commenced on 7 April. The Luftwaffe committed StG 1, 2 and 77 to the campaign. The Stuka once again spearheaded the air assault, with a front line strength of 300 machines, against minimal Yugoslav resistance in the air, allowing the Stukas to develop a fearsome reputation in this region. Operating unmolested, they took a heavy toll on ground forces, suffering only light losses to ground fire. The effectiveness of the dive bombers helped bring about Yugoslav capitulation in ten days. The Stukas also took a peripheral part in Operation Punishment, Hitler's retribution bombing of Belgrade. The dive bombers were to attack airfields and anti-aircraft gun positions as the level bombers struck civilian targets. Belgrade was badly damaged, with 2,271 people killed and 12,000 injured.

In Greece, despite British aid, little air opposition was encountered during the German invasion. As the Allies withdrew and resistance collapsed, the Allies began evacuating to Crete. The Stukas inflicted severe damage on Allied shipping. On 22 April, the 1,389 ton destroyers Psara and Ydra were sunk. In the next two days, the Greek naval base at Piraeus lost 23 vessels to Stuka attack.

During the Battle of Crete, the Ju 87s also played a significant role. On 21–22 May 1941, the Germans attempted to send in reinforcements to Crete by sea but lost 10 vessels to "Force D" under the command of Rear Admiral Irvine Glennie. The force, consisting of the cruisers HMS Dido, Orion and Ajax, forced the remaining German ships to retreat. The Stukas were called upon to deal with the British naval threat. On 21 May, the destroyer HMS Juno was sunk and the next day the battleship HMS Warspite was damaged and the cruiser HMS Gloucester was sunk, with the loss of 45 officers and 648 ratings. The Ju 87s also crippled the cruiser HMS Fiji that morning (she was later finished off by Bf 109 fighter bombers), while sinking the destroyer HMS Greyhound with one hit. As the Battle of Crete drew to a close, the Allies began yet another withdrawal. On 23 May, the Royal Navy lost the destroyers HMS Kashmir and Kelly, followed by HMS Hereward on 26 May; Orion and Dido were also severely damaged. Orion had been evacuating 1,100 soldiers to North Africa; 260 of them were killed and another 280 wounded.

The dive bomber wing supported Generalfeldmarschall Erwin Rommel's Afrika Korps in its two-year campaign in North Africa; its other main task was attacking Allied shipping. In 1941, Ju 87 operations in North Africa were dominated by the Siege of Tobruk, which lasted for over seven months. It served during the Battle of Gazala and the First Battle of El Alamein, as well as the decisive Second Battle of El Alamein, which drove Rommel back to Tunisia. As the tide turned and Allied air power grew in the autumn of 1942, the Ju 87 became very vulnerable and losses were heavy. The entry of the Americans into North Africa with the Operation Torch invasion of French North Africa made the situation far worse; the Stuka was obsolete in what was now a fighter-bomber's war. The Bf 109 and Fw 190 could at least fight enemy fighters on equal terms after dropping their ordnance, but the Stuka could not. The Ju 87's vulnerability was demonstrated on 11 November 1942, when 15 Ju 87Ds were shot down by United States Army Air Forces (USAAF) Curtiss P-40Fs in minutes. According to Ring and Shores there were 15 Ju 87s on the mission, 2 Squadron SAAF shot down eight with four probable and three were shot down by 57th Fighter Group. Two South-African and one American lost shot down by German fighter escort. Three Stuka crews were captured, one was wounded.

By 1943, the Allies enjoyed air supremacy in North Africa. The Ju 87s ventured out in Rotte strength only, often jettisoning their bombs at the first sight of enemy aircraft. Adding to this trouble, the German fighters had only enough fuel to cover the Ju 87s on takeoff, their most vulnerable point. After that, the Stukas were on their own.

The dive bombers continued operations in southern Europe; after the Italian surrender in September 1943, the Ju 87 participated in the last campaign-sized victory over the Western Allies, the Dodecanese Campaign. The Dodecanese Islands had been occupied by the British; the Luftwaffe committed 75 Stukas of StG 3 based in Megara (I./StG 3) and Argos (II.StG 3; from 17 October on Rhodes), to recover the islands. With the RAF bases 500 kilometres (310 mi) away, the Ju 87 helped the German landing forces rapidly conquer the islands. On 5 October, the minelayer Lagnano was sunk along with a patrol vessel, a steam ship, and the auxiliary landing ship Porto Di Roma. On 24 October, Ju 87s sank the landing craft LCT-115 and cargo ship Taganrog at Samos. On 31 October, the light cruiser Aurora was put out of action for a year. The light cruisers Penelope and Carlisle were badly damaged by StG 3, and the destroyer Panther was sunk by Ju 87s before the capitulation of the Allied force. It proved to be the Stuka's final victory against the British.

=== Eastern Front ===
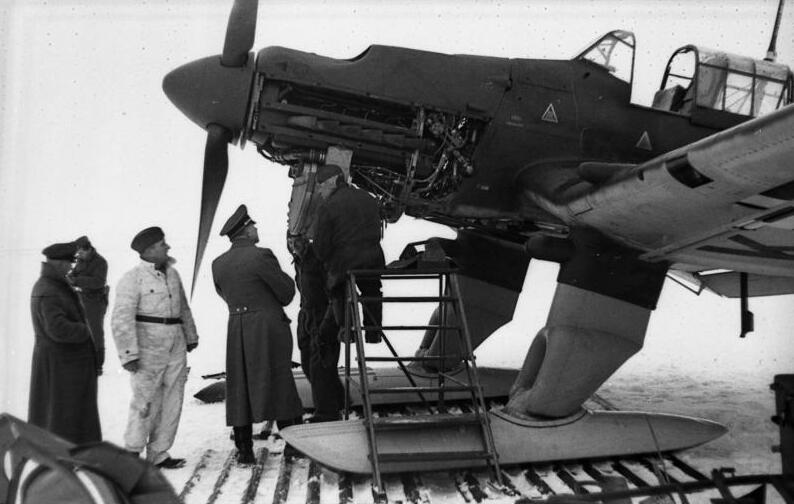
The Eastern Front brought new challenges. A Ju 87 B-2 is fitted with ski undercarriage to cope with the winter weather, 22 December 1941.

==== Barbarossa: 1941 ====
On 22 June 1941, the Wehrmacht commenced Operation Barbarossa, the invasion of the Soviet Union. The Luftwaffe order of battle of 22 June 1941 contained four dive bomber wings. VIII. Fliegerkorps was equipped with units Stab, II. and III./StG 1. Also included were Stab, I., II. and III. of Sturzkampfgeschwader 2 Immelmann. Attached to II. Fliegerkorps, under the command of General der Flieger Bruno Loerzer, were Stab, I., II. and III. of StG 77. Luftflotte 5, under the command of Generaloberst Hans-Jürgen Stumpff, operating from Norway's Arctic Circle, were allotted IV. Gruppe (St)/Lehrgeschwader 1 (LG 1).

The first Stuka loss on the Soviet-German front occurred early at 03:40–03:47 in the morning of 22 June. While being escorted by Bf 109s from JG 51 to attack Brest Fortress, Oberleutnant Karl Führing of StG 77 was shot down by a Polikarpov I-153. The dive bomber wing suffered only two losses on the opening day of Barbarossa. As a result of the Luftwaffe's attention, the Soviet Air Force in the western Soviet Union was nearly destroyed. The official report claimed 1,489 Soviet aircraft destroyed: even Göring was unable to believe such a high total and ordered this checked. After picking their way through the wreckage across the front, Luftwaffe officers found that the tally exceeded 2,000. In the next two days, the Soviets reported the loss of another 1,922 aircraft.

The Ju 87 took a huge toll on Soviet ground forces, helping to break up counterattacks of Soviet armour, eliminating strongpoints, and disrupting the enemy supply lines. A demonstration of the Stuka's effectiveness occurred on 5 July, when StG 77 knocked out 18 trains and 500 vehicles. As the 1st and 2nd Panzer Groups forced bridgeheads across the Dnieper river and closed in on Kyiv, the Ju 87s again rendered invaluable support. On 13 September, Stukas from StG 1 destroyed the rail network in the vicinity as well as inflicting heavy casualties on escaping Red Army columns, for the loss of one Ju 87. On 23 September, Rudel (who was to become the most decorated serviceman in the Wehrmacht) of StG 2, helped sink the Soviet battleship Marat, during an air attack on Kronstadt harbour near Leningrad, which was struck by two 1,000 kg (2,200 lb) bombs. During this action, Leutnant Egbert Jaeckel sank the destroyer Minsk, while the destroyer Steregushchiy and submarine M-74 were also sunk. The Stukas also crippled the battleship Oktyabrskaya Revolutsiya and the destroyers Silnyy and Grozyashchiy in exchange for two Ju 87s shot down.

Elsewhere on the Eastern Front, the Junkers assisted Army Group Centre in its drive toward Moscow. From 13 to 22 December, 420 vehicles and 23 tanks were destroyed by StG 77, greatly improving the morale of the German infantry, who were by now on the defensive. StG 77 finished the campaign as the most effective dive bomber wing. It had destroyed 2,401 vehicles, 234 tanks, 92 artillery batteries, and 21 trains for the loss of 25 Ju 87s to hostile action. At the end of Barbarossa, StG 1 had lost 60 Stukas in aerial combat and one on the ground: StG 2 lost 39 Ju 87s in the air and two on the ground; StG 77 lost 29 of their dive bombers in the air and three on the ground (25 to enemy action); and IV.(St)/LG1, operating from Norway, lost 24 Ju 87s, all in aerial combat.

==== Fall Blau to Stalingrad: 1942 ====
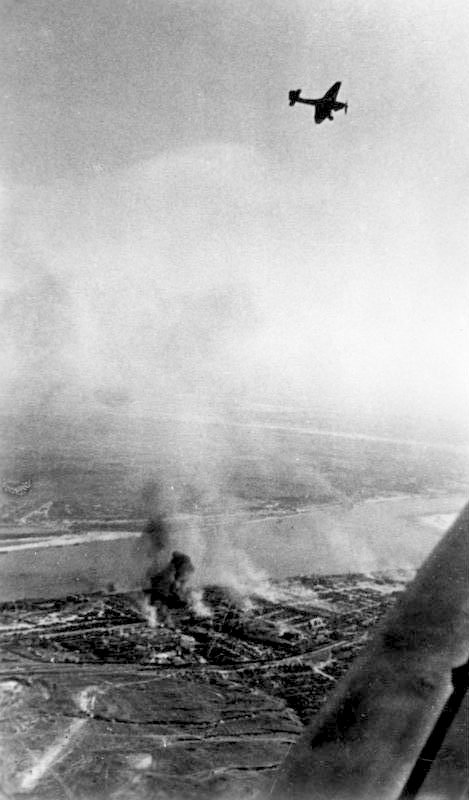
Ju 87B over Stalingrad

In early 1942, the Ju 87s gave the Heer yet more valuable support. On 29 December 1941, the Soviet 44th Army landed on the Kerch Peninsula. The Luftwaffe was only able to dispatch meager reinforcements of four bomber groups (Kampfgruppen) and two dive bomber groups belonging to StG 77. With air superiority, the Ju 87s operated with impunity. In the first 10 days of the Battle of the Kerch Peninsula, half the landing force was destroyed, while sea lanes were blocked by the Stukas inflicting heavy losses on Soviet shipping. The Ju 87's effectiveness against Soviet armour was not yet potent. Later versions of the T-34 tank could withstand Stuka attacks in general, unless a direct hit was scored, but the Soviet 44th Army had only obsolescent types with thin armour which were nearly all destroyed. During the Battle of Sevastopol, the Stukas repeatedly bombed the trapped Soviet forces. Some Ju 87 pilots flew up to 300 sorties against the Soviet defenders; StG 77 (Luftflotte 4) flew 7,708 combat sorties, dropping 3,537 tonnes of bombs on the city. Their efforts helped to secure the capitulation of Soviet forces on 4 July.

For the German summer offensive, Fall Blau, the Luftwaffe had concentrated 1,800 aircraft into Luftflotte 4 making it the largest and most powerful air command in the world. The Stukawaffe strength stood at 151. During the Battle of Stalingrad, Stukas flew thousands of sorties against Soviet positions in the city: StG 1, 2 and 77 flew 320 sorties on 14 October 1942. As the German Sixth Army pushed the Soviets into a 1,000-metre enclave on the west bank of the Volga River, 1,208 Stuka sorties were flown against this small strip of land. The intense air attack, though causing horrific losses on Soviet units, failed to destroy them. The Luftwaffe's Stuka force made a maximum effort during this phase of the war. They flew an average of 500 sorties per day and caused heavy losses among Soviet forces, losing an average of only one Stuka per day. The Battle of Stalingrad marked the high point in the fortunes of the Junkers Ju 87 Stuka. As the strength of the Soviet Air Forces grew, they gradually wrested control of the skies from the Luftwaffe and from this point onward, Stuka losses increased.

==== Kursk and decline: 1943 ====
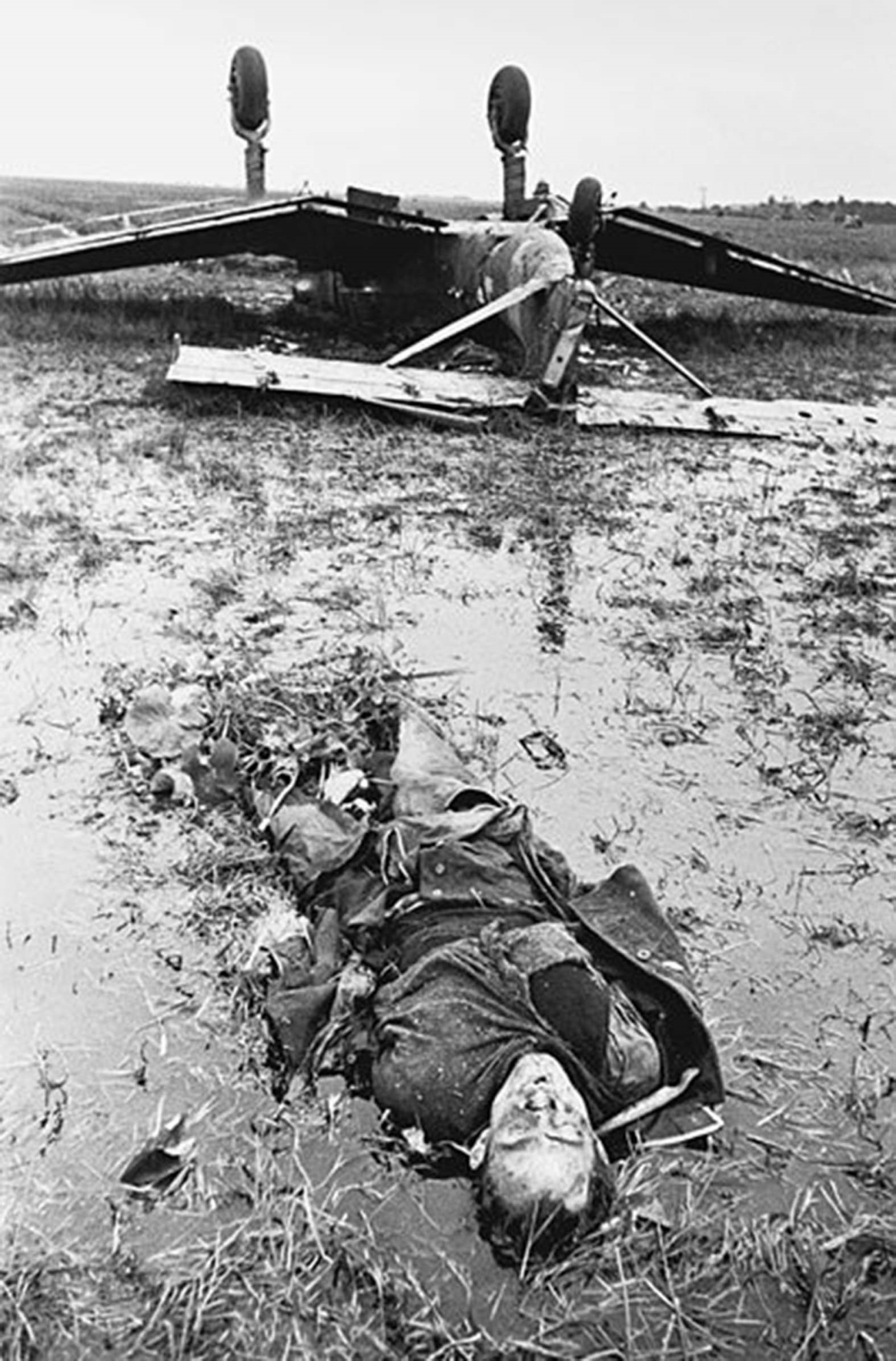
A wrecked Ju-87 and the corpse of its pilot near Leningrad, June 1943

The Stuka was also heavily involved in Operation Citadel, the Kursk offensive. The Luftwaffe committed I, II, III./St.G 1, and III./StG 3 under the command of Luftflotte 6. I., II, III. of StGs 2 and 3 were committed under the command of Fliegerkorps VIII. Rudel's cannon-equipped Ju 87 Gs had a devastating effect on Soviet armour at Orel and Belgorod. The Ju 87s participated in a huge aerial counter-offensive lasting from 16 to 31 July against a Soviet offensive at Khotynets and saved two German armies from encirclement, reducing the attacking Soviet 11th Guards Army to 33 tanks by 20 July. The Soviet offensive had been completely halted from the air although losses were considerable. Fliegerkorps VIII lost eight Ju 87s on 8 July, six on 9 July, six on 10 July and another eight on 11 July. The Stuka arm also lost eight of their Knight's Cross of the Iron Cross holders. StG 77 lost 24 Ju 87s in the period 5–31 July (StG had lost 23 in July–December 1942), while StG 2 lost another 30 aircraft in the same period. In September 1943, three of the Stuka units were re-equipped with the Fw 190F and G (ground attack versions) and began to be renamed Schlachtgeschwader (attack wings). In the face of overwhelming air opposition, the dive bomber required heavy protection from German fighters to counter Soviet fighters. Some units like SG 2 Immelmann continued to operate with great success throughout 1943–45, operating the Ju 87 G variants equipped with 37 mm cannons, which became tank killers, although in increasingly small numbers.

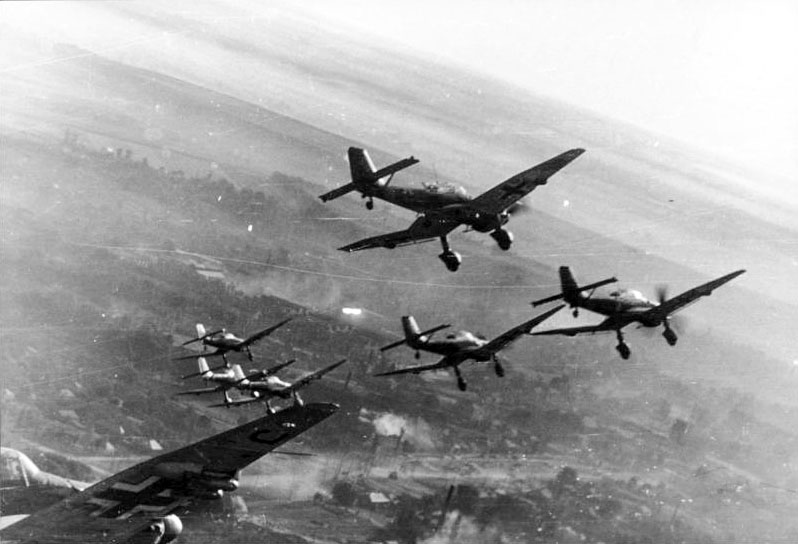
Ju 87 Ds over the Eastern Front, 22 December 1943

In the wake of the defeat at Kursk, Ju 87s played a vital defensive role on the southern wing of the Eastern Front. To combat the Luftwaffe, the Soviets could deploy 3,000 fighter aircraft. As a result, the Stukas suffered heavily; SG 77 lost 30 Ju 87s in August 1943, as did SG 2 Immelmann, which also reported the loss of 30 aircraft in combat operations. Despite these losses, Ju 87s helped the XXIX Army Corps break out of an encirclement near the Sea of Azov. The Battle of Kiev also included substantial use of the Ju 87 units, although it was again unsuccessful in stemming the advances. With the loss of air superiority, Stuka units were becoming vulnerable on the ground as well. Some Stuka aces were lost this way. In the aftermath of Kursk, Stuka strength fell to 184 aircraft in total. This was well below 50 per cent of the required strength. On 18 October 1943, StG 1, 2, 3, 5, and 77 were renamed Schlachtgeschwader (SG) wings, reflecting their ground-attack role, as these combat wings were now also using ground-attack aircraft, such as the Fw 190F-series aircraft. The Luftwaffe's dive bomber units had ceased to exist.

A few Ju 87s were also retained for anti-shipping operations in the Black Sea, a role it had proved successful in when operating in the Mediterranean. In October 1943, this became evident again when StG 3 carried out several attacks against the Soviet Black Sea Fleet. On 6 October 1943, the most powerful flotilla in the fleet, comprising the destroyer leader Kharkov and the destroyers Besposhchadny and Sposobny, were sunk. After the disaster, Joseph Stalin decreed that no more ships were to pass within range of German aircraft without his personal permission.

==== Operation Bagration to Berlin: 1944–1945 ====
Towards the end of the war, as the Allies gained air supremacy, the Stuka was being replaced by ground-attack versions of the Fw 190. By early 1944, the number of Ju 87 units and operational aircraft terminally declined. For the Soviet summer offensive, Operation Bagration, 12 Ju 87 groups and five mixed groups (including Fw 190s) were on the Luftwaffe's order of battle on 26 June 1944. Detachment Kuhlmey, a mixed aircraft unit, which included large numbers of Stuka dive bombers, was rushed to the Finnish front in the summer of 1944 and was instrumental in halting the Soviet fourth strategic offensive. The unit claimed 200 Soviet tanks and 150 Soviet aircraft destroyed for 41 losses. By 31 January 1945, only 104 Ju 87s remained operational with their units. The other mixed Schlacht units contained a further 70 Ju 87s and Fw 190s between them. Chronic fuel shortages kept the Stukas grounded and sorties decreased until the end of the war in May 1945.

In the final months of the war, the ground attack groups were still able to impose operational constraints upon the enemy; most notably, the aircraft participated in the defence of Berlin. On 12 January 1945, the 1st Belorussian Front initiated the Vistula–Oder Offensive, which made rapid progress. The Soviets eventually outran their air support, which was unable to use forward, quagmire-filled, airfields. The Germans, who had fallen back on airbases with good facilities and concrete runways, were able to mount uninterrupted attacks against Soviet army columns. Reminiscent of the early war years, the Luftwaffe was able to inflict high losses largely unopposed: over 800 vehicles were destroyed within two weeks. In the first three days of February 1945, 2,000 vehicles and 51 tanks were claimed to be lost to German air attacks. The Ju 87 participated in these intense battles in small numbers. It was the largest concentration of German air power since 1940, and even in February 1945 the Germans were able to achieve and challenge for air superiority on the Eastern Front. The air offensive was instrumental in saving Berlin, albeit only for three months. The effort exhausted German fuel reserves. The contribution of the Ju 87 was exemplified by Rudel, who claimed 13 enemy tanks on 8 February 1945.

Post-war research revealed that, generally, bombing pilots were far less effective than they claimed. The German Luftwaffe, in particular, did not do a scientific analysis of the Ju 87 pilot claims in 1939–1945, but instead relied on pre-war tests and assumptions. In contrast, the Allies did such research during the war, which showed that pilots, for a number of reasons, misjudged most of their tank kills; revealing the ineffectiveness of dive bombers as an anti-tank weapon, except for the suppression effect of the bombing.

== Operators ==
=== Bulgaria ===
- Bulgarian Air Force – Bulgaria received 12 Ju 87 R-2 and R-4s and 40 Ju 87 D-5s.

=== Croatia ===
- Zrakoplovstvo Nezavisne Države Hrvatske – Croatia received Ju 87s, delivered to the Lucko bomber unit in January 1944.

=== Czechoslovakia ===
- The Czechoslovak Air Force operated captured aircraft postwar, five Ju 87 D-5s registrations OK-XAA – OK-XAE - OK-KAC. These were operated by the Czechs under the “B-37" designation.

=== Nazi Germany ===
- Luftwaffe

=== Kingdom of Hungary ===
- Royal Hungarian Air Force – received 33/34 Ju 87 D-3/D-5s and 11/12 B-1 and B-2s.

=== Kingdom of Italy ===
- Regia Aeronautica – Regia Aeronautica received a delivery of 46 Ju 87 D-2 and D-3 dive bombers and some Ju 87 R-2s.

=== Empire of Japan ===
- Imperial Japanese Army Air Force – Purchased two aircraft from Germany for evaluation. Japan received the Ju 87 A-1 (called a Ju 87 K-1)

=== Kingdom of Romania ===
- Royal Romanian Air Force – 90 Ju 87 D-3 and D-5s.

=== Slovak Republic (1939–1945) ===
- Slovak Air Force – Operated 6 Ju 87 D-1s and 5 more Ju 87s of an unknown variant from 1943.

=== Spain ===
- Spanish Air Force

=== United Kingdom ===
- Royal Air Force tested various captured variants during and after the war.

=== United States ===
- United States Army Air Forces tested various captured variants during and after the war.

=== Yugoslavia ===
- SFR Yugoslav Air Force operated captured aircraft.

== Surviving aircraft ==
=== Intact Ju 87s ===
==== Ju 87 G-2, Werk Nr. 494083 ====
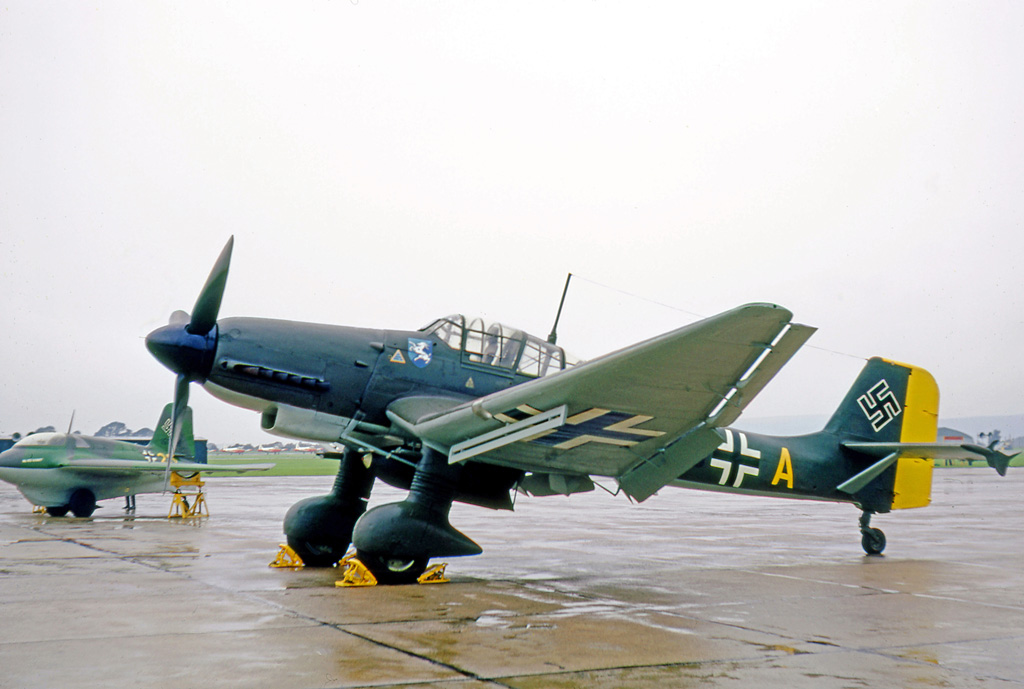
Ju 87G-2 494083 displayed at RAF Chivenor in 1970 wearing inaccurate wing code W8-A, with "W8" belonging to a Messerschmitt Me 321 cargo glider unit

A later, ground-attack variant, this is displayed at the Royal Air Force Museum in London; it was captured by British forces at Eggebek, Schleswig-Holstein in May 1945. It is thought to have been built in 1943–1944 as a D-5 before being rebuilt as a G-2 variant, possibly by fitting G-2 outer wings to a D-5 airframe. The wings have the hard-points for Bordkanone BK 3,7 gun-pods, but these are not fitted. It was one of 12 captured German aircraft selected by the British for museum preservation and assigned to the Air Historical Branch. The aircraft was stored and displayed at various RAF sites until 1978, when it was moved to the RAF Museum. In 1967, permission was given to use the aircraft in the film Battle of Britain, and it was repainted and modified to resemble a 1940 variant of the Ju 87. The engine was found to be in excellent condition and there was little difficulty in starting it, but returning the aircraft to airworthiness was considered too costly for the filmmakers and, ultimately, models were used in the film to represent Stukas. In 1998, the film modifications were removed, and the aircraft returned to the original G-2 configuration.

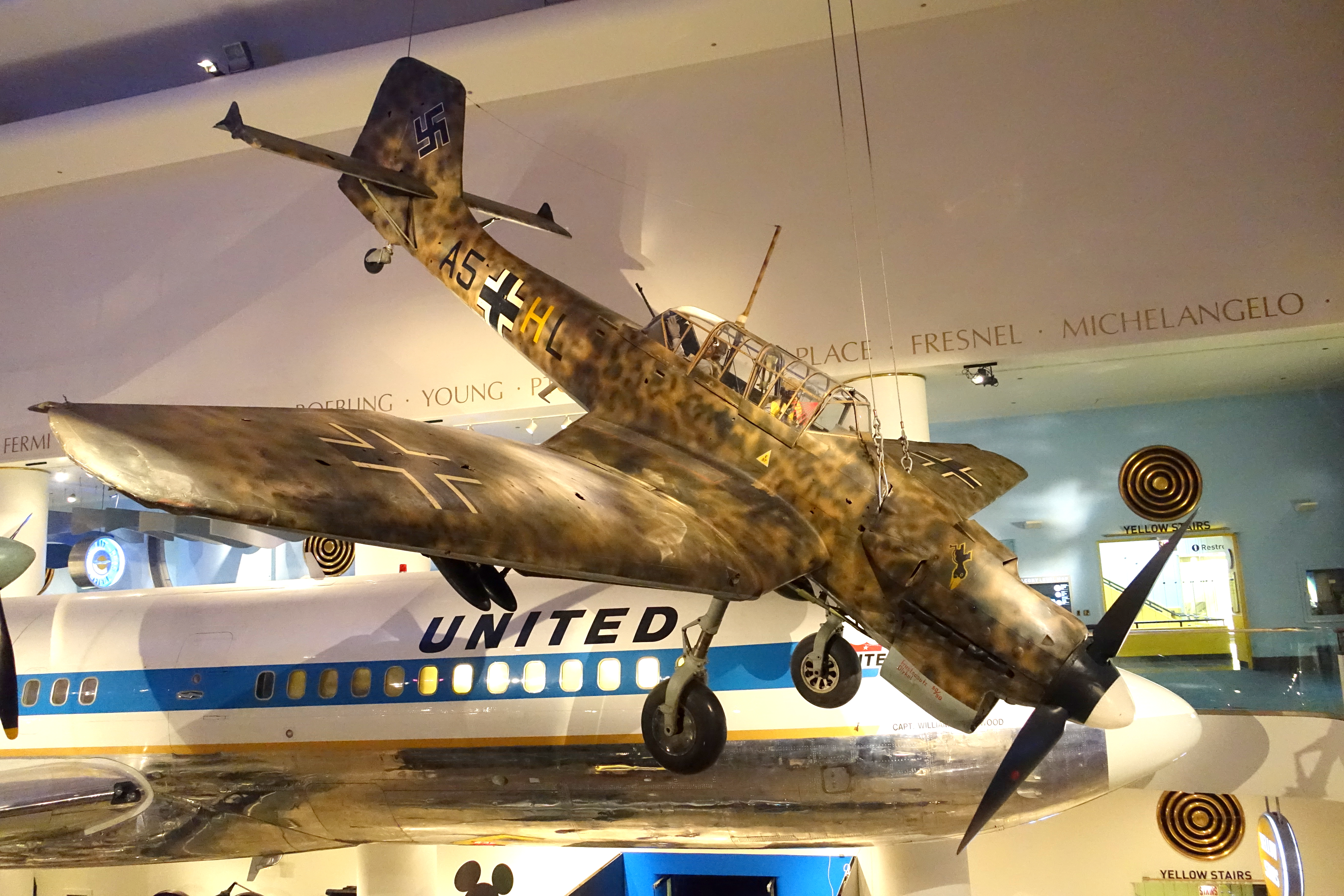
Ju 87 R-2/Trop 5954 at the Museum of Science and Industry, Chicago (2014)

==== Ju 87 R-2/Trop. Werk Nr. 5954 ====
This aircraft is displayed in the Chicago Museum of Science and Industry. It was abandoned in North Africa and found by British forces in 1941. The Ju 87 was donated by the British government and sent to the US during the war. It was fully restored in 1974 by the Experimental Aircraft Association of Wisconsin.

=== Under restoration ===
==== Ju 87 R-4, Werk Nr. 6234 (incorporating 857509) ====
One aircraft is being restored to airworthy condition from two wrecks, owned by Paul Allen's Flying Heritage & Combat Armor Museum. The project takes its identification from Ju 87 R-4 Werk Nr. 6234, which was built in 1941 and served with Stukageschwader 5; shot down in April 1942 on a mission to bomb Murmansk, it was recovered in 1992. The wreck was purchased by New Zealand collector Tim Wallis, who originally planned for a rebuild to airworthy status, but it later went to the Deutsches Technikmuseum in Berlin. Parts have also been incorporated from a second airframe: a Ju 87 R-2 Werknummer 857509, which served bearing the Stammkennzeichen of code LI+KU from 1./St.G.5 and was recovered to the United Kingdom in 1998. The project was displayed in November 2018, and the restoration was stated to take between 18 months and two years to complete. Work will be conducted in a display hangar to allow the public to observe the work underway.

Other aircraft survive as wreckage at or recovered from crash sites:

- A "Stuka" wreck was discovered in 2014 near the island of Žirje in Croatia, which belonged to Ju 87R-2 from 239 squadiglie of the Italian Royal Air Force. On 12 April 1941, during the Balkans Campaign in World War II, it was attacking the Kingdom of Yugoslavia's torpedo boats together with two more Stukas when it was shot down. Today the wreck is a visiting site for many scuba divers, lying at a depth of 28 meters.
- The Deutsches Technikmuseum in Berlin has the wreckage of two complete aircraft that were recovered from separate crash sites near Murmansk in 1990 and 1994. These wrecks were purchased from New Zealand collector Tim Wallis in 1996, who originally planned for the remains to be restored to airworthy.
- The Sinsheim Auto & Technik Museum displays the remains of an aircraft that crashed near Saint-Tropez, France in 1944 and was raised from the seabed in 1989.
- In October 2006, a Ju 87 D-3/Trop. was recovered underwater, near Rhodes, Greece. The aircraft is now in the Hellenic Air Force Museum.
- Junkers Ju 87 B-2, Code 98+01, Werk Nr. 870406, is on display at the Aeronautical Museum, Belgrade. The parts of three others have been found (S2+?? [StG 77]; H4+?? [Luftlandegeschwader 1]; 5B+?? [Nachtschlachtgruppe 10])
- Junkers Ju 87 B-3 Werk Nr. 110757 was found in the village of Krościenko Wyżne in Poland, in October 2015.
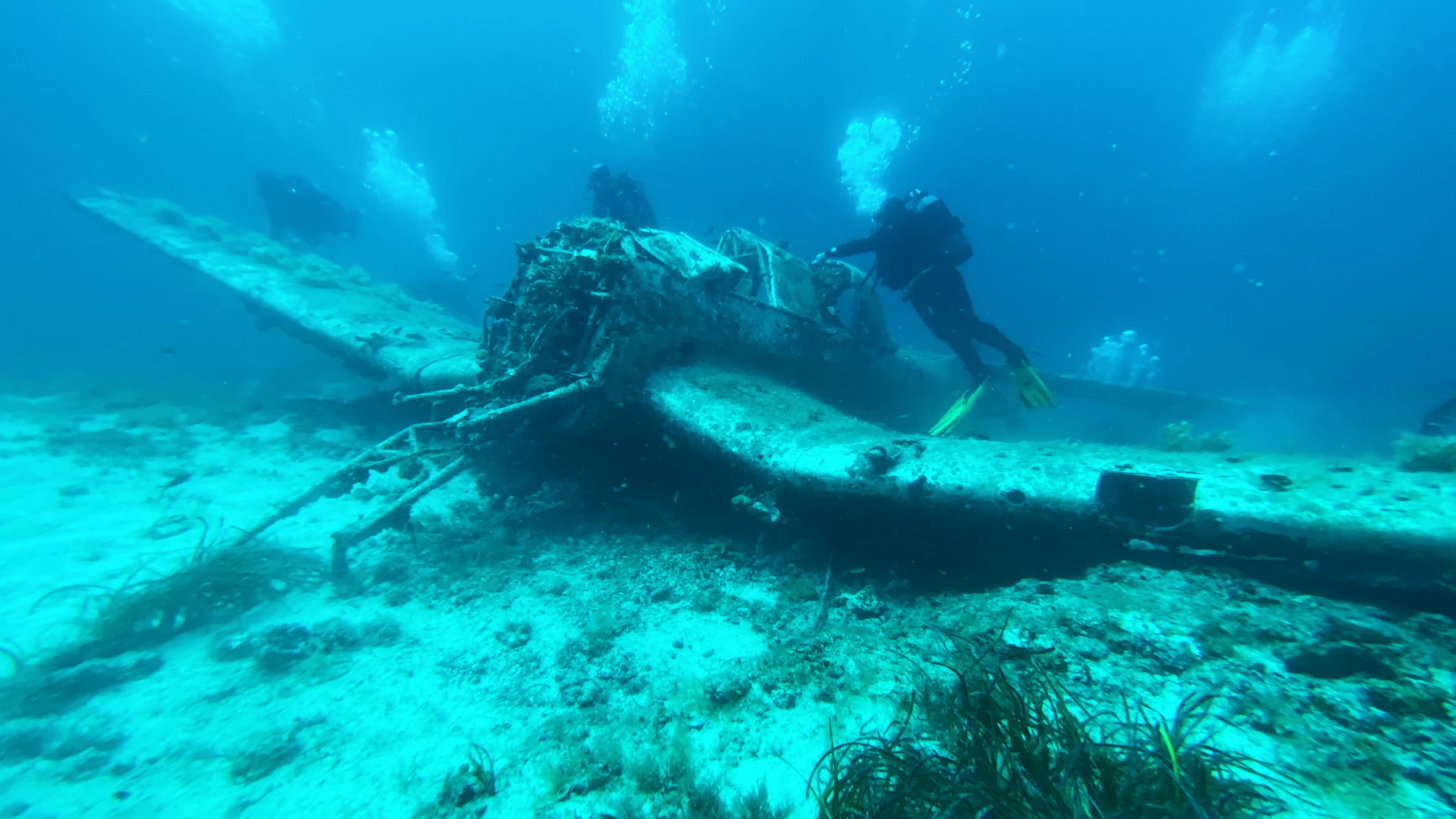
Ju 87 underwater wreck, Adriatic sea, Croatia (2021)

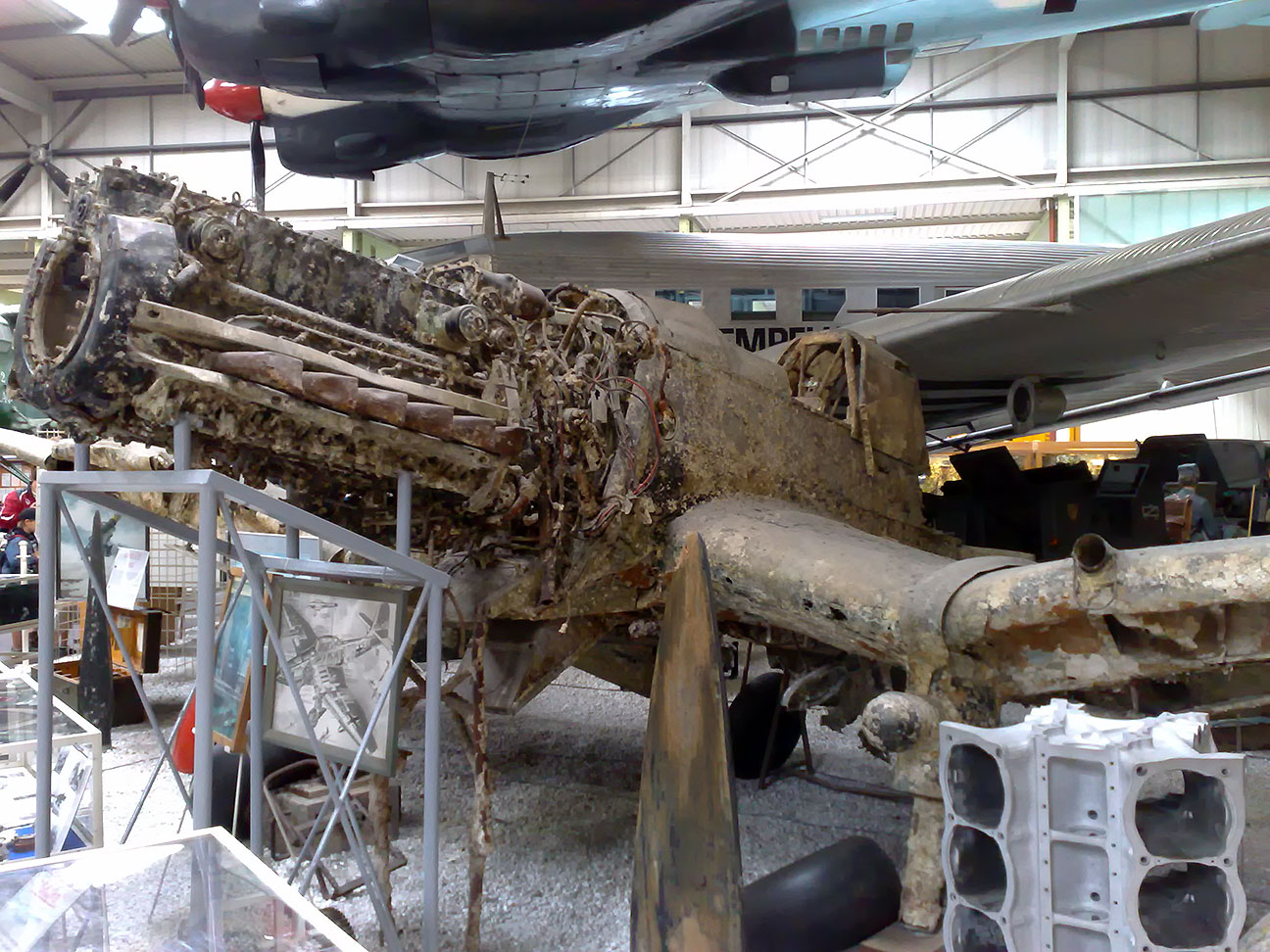
Ju 87 wreck, Sinsheim Auto & Technik Museum (2008)

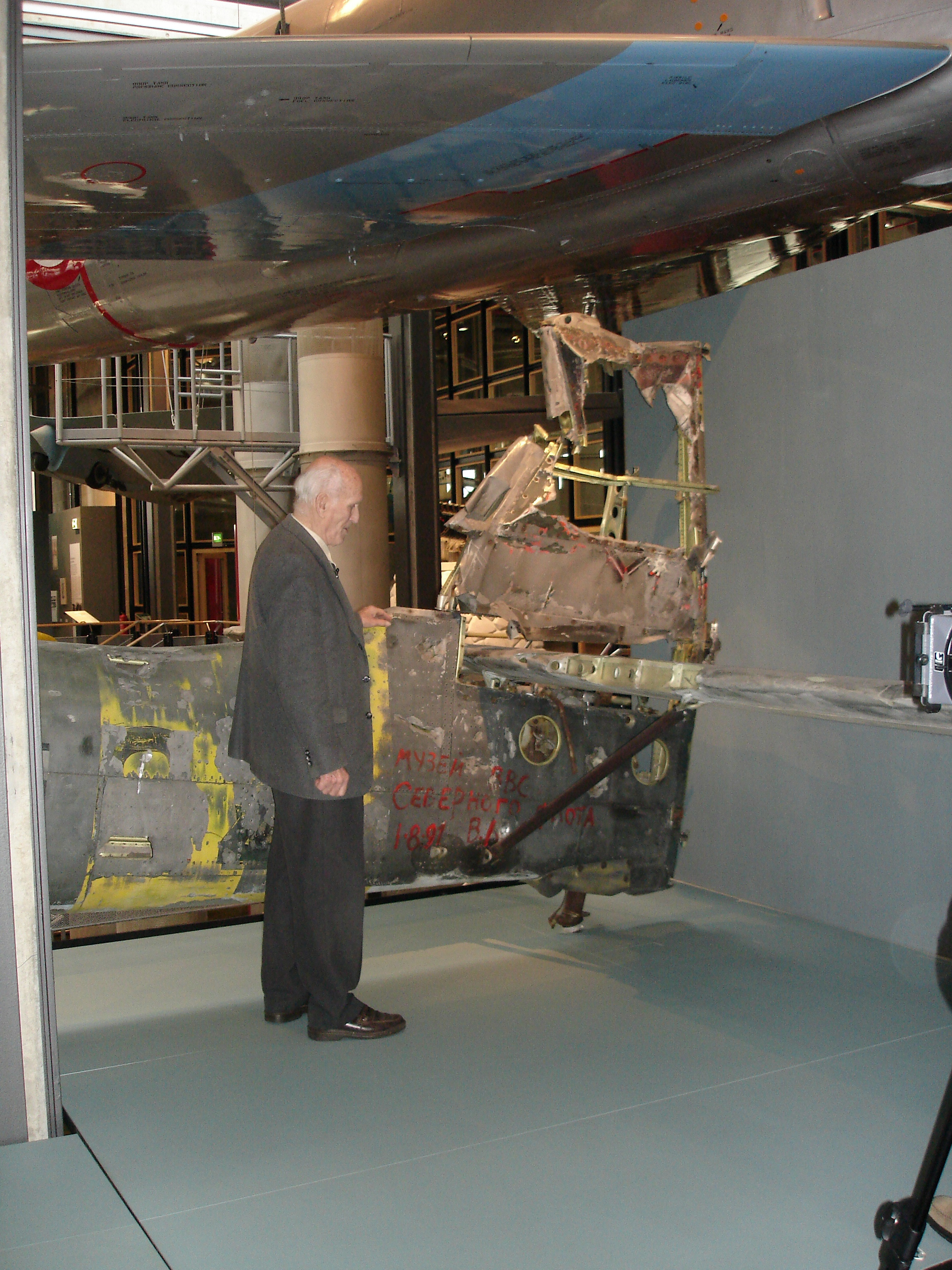
Deutsches Technikmuseum, with a veteran gunner speaking of his combat in North Africa

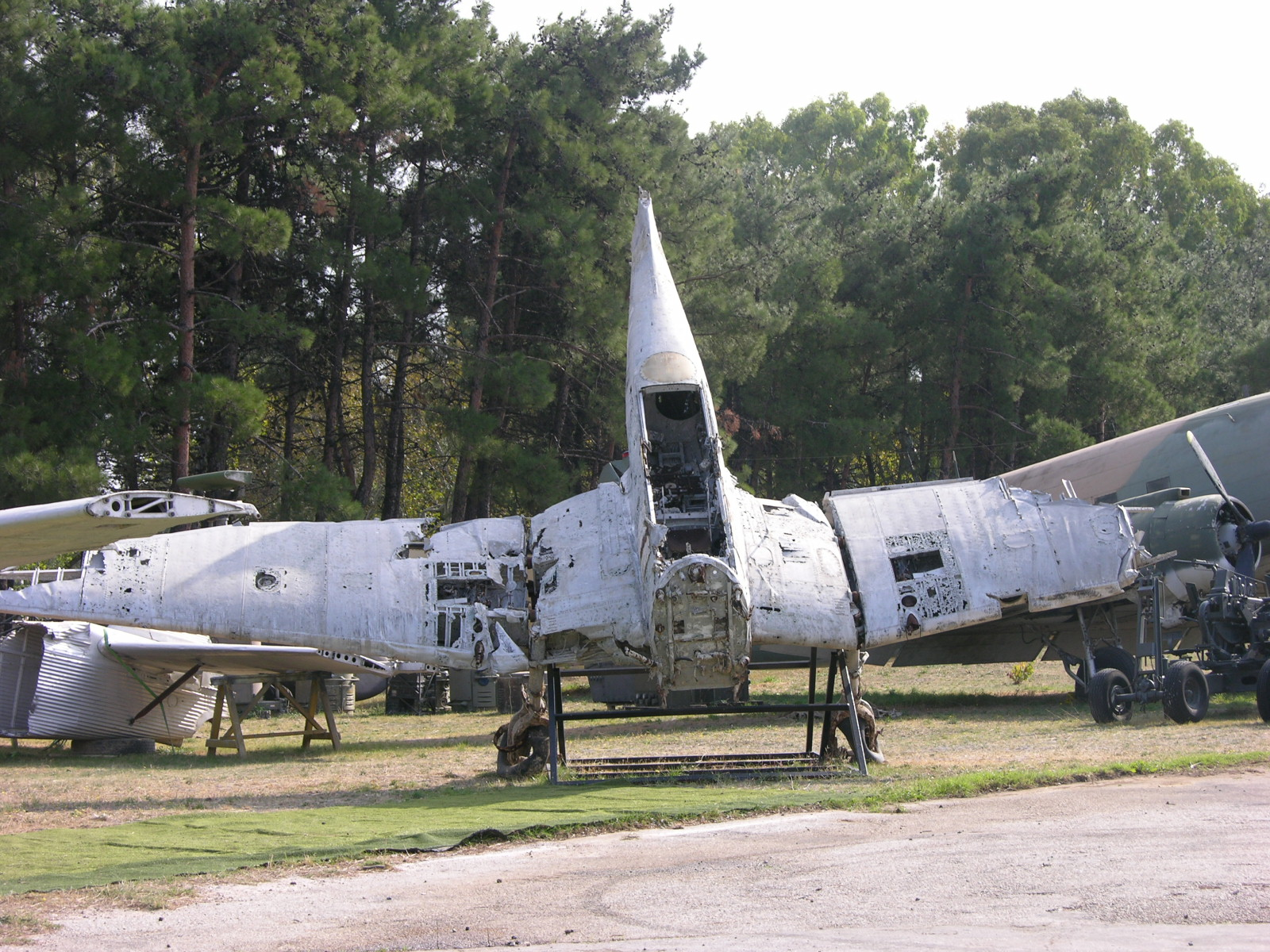
The Ju 87 at the Hellenic Air Force Museum, Greece

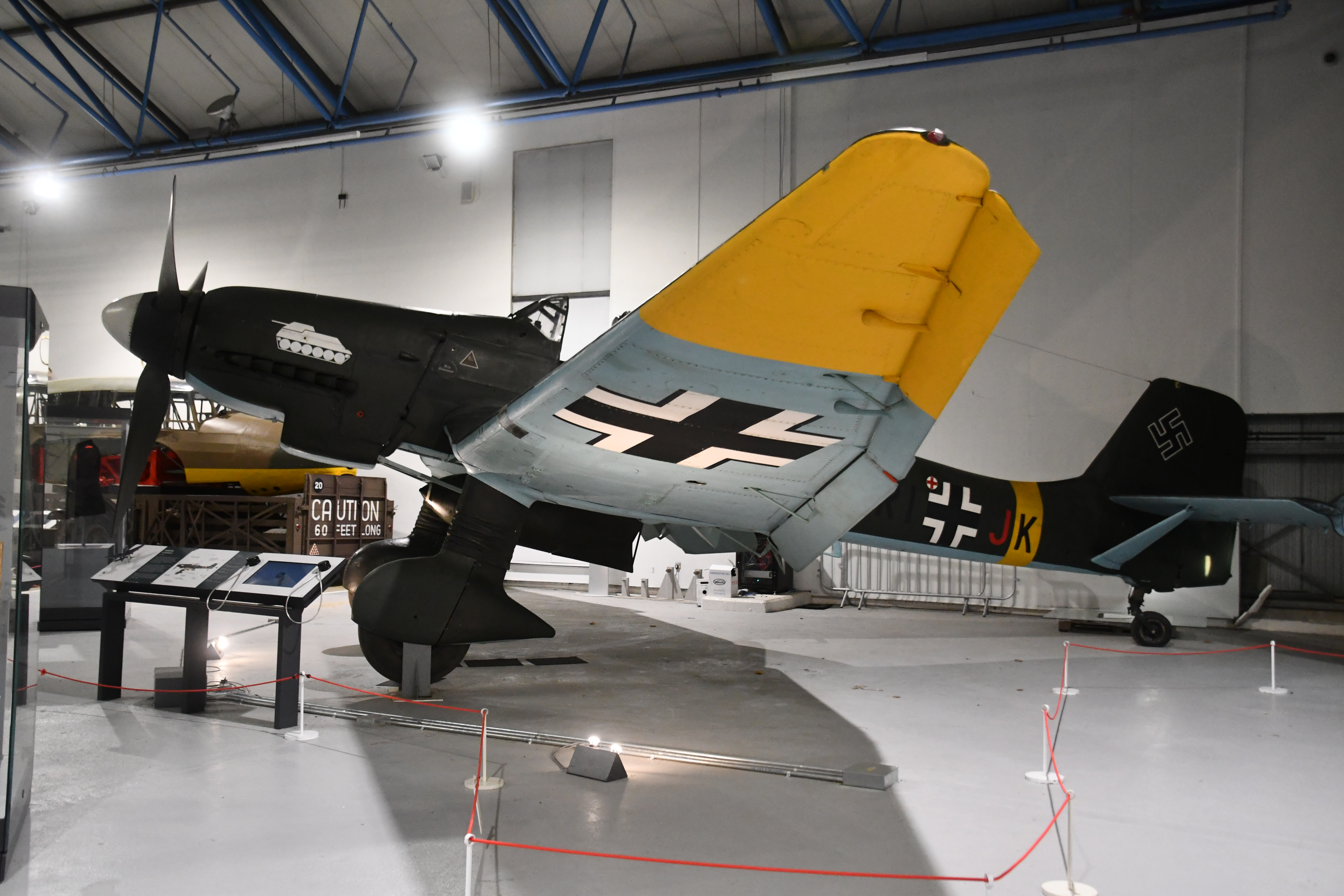
Junkers Ju 87 D G-2, RAF Museum London

=== Replicas ===
Replicas at 7/10 scale were built by Louis Langhurst and Richard H. Kurzenberger. Langhurst's aircraft ended up with the Commemorative Air Force, and Kurzenburger's was written off in a crash that killed the pilot in 2000.

== In popular culture ==
According to sound designer Richard King, the sound of the "Lärmgerät" (often incorrectly referred to as "Jericho trumpets") "is often used in movies and TV shows as the classic dive bomber sound, plane crashing sound, or for an anvil dropping on Wile E. Coyote’s head".

The Ju-87 siren is played at the end of Pink Floyd's "In the Flesh?" from The Wall. In the film based on the album, a Stuka is shown bombing Pink's father as the song plays.

== Specifications (Ju 87D-1) ==
Junkers Ju 87B-2

Data from Warplanes of the Third Reich

General characteristics

- Crew: 2
- Length: 11.5 m (37 ft 8.75 in)
- Wingspan: 13.8 m (45 ft 3.5 in)
- Height: 3.9 m (12 ft 9.25 in)
- Wing area: 31.9 m^{2} (343.37 sq ft)
- Airfoil: Göttingen 256
- Empty weight: 3,900 kg (8,598 lb) (equipped)
- Max takeoff weight: 6,600 kg (14,550 lb)
- Powerplant: 1 × Junkers Jumo 211J V-12 inverted liquid-cooled piston engine, 1,000 kW (1,400 hp) for take-off

1,050 kW (1,410 hp) at 4,300 m (14,100 ft)

- Propellers: 3-bladed Junkers constant-speed propeller

Performance

- Maximum speed: 410 km/h (255 mph, 222 kn) at 4,100 m (13,500 ft)
- Cruise speed: 319 km/h (198 mph, 172 kn) at 5,100 m (16,700 ft)
- Range: 1,535 km (954 mi, 829 nmi) at 5,100 m (16,730 ft) (maximum)
- Service ceiling: 7,300 m (24,000 ft)
- Time to altitude: 5,000 m (16,400 ft) in 20 minutes

Armament

- Guns: 2 × 7.92 mm (0.31 in) MG 17 machine guns forward firing, 1 × 7.92 mm (0.31 in) twin MG 81 machine gun to rear
- Bombs: 1 × 250 kg (550 lb) bomb beneath the fuselage and 4× 50 kg (110 lb) under-wing.

== See also ==
Related development

- Junkers Ju 187
- Heinkel He 118

Aircraft of comparable role, configuration, and era

- Aichi D3A
- Blackburn Skua
- Breda Ba.65
- Curtiss SB2C Helldiver
- Douglas SBD Dauntless
- Ilyushin Il-2
- Loire-Nieuport LN.401
- Mitsubishi Ki-51
- Nakajima B5N
- Saab 17
- Vultee A-31 Vengeance

Related lists

- List of aircraft of World War II
- List of military aircraft of Germany
- List of bomber aircraft
