= Bombing of Wieluń =

Luftwaffe air strikes on Wieluń on 1 September 1939, starting World War II

- Part of the Invasion of Poland
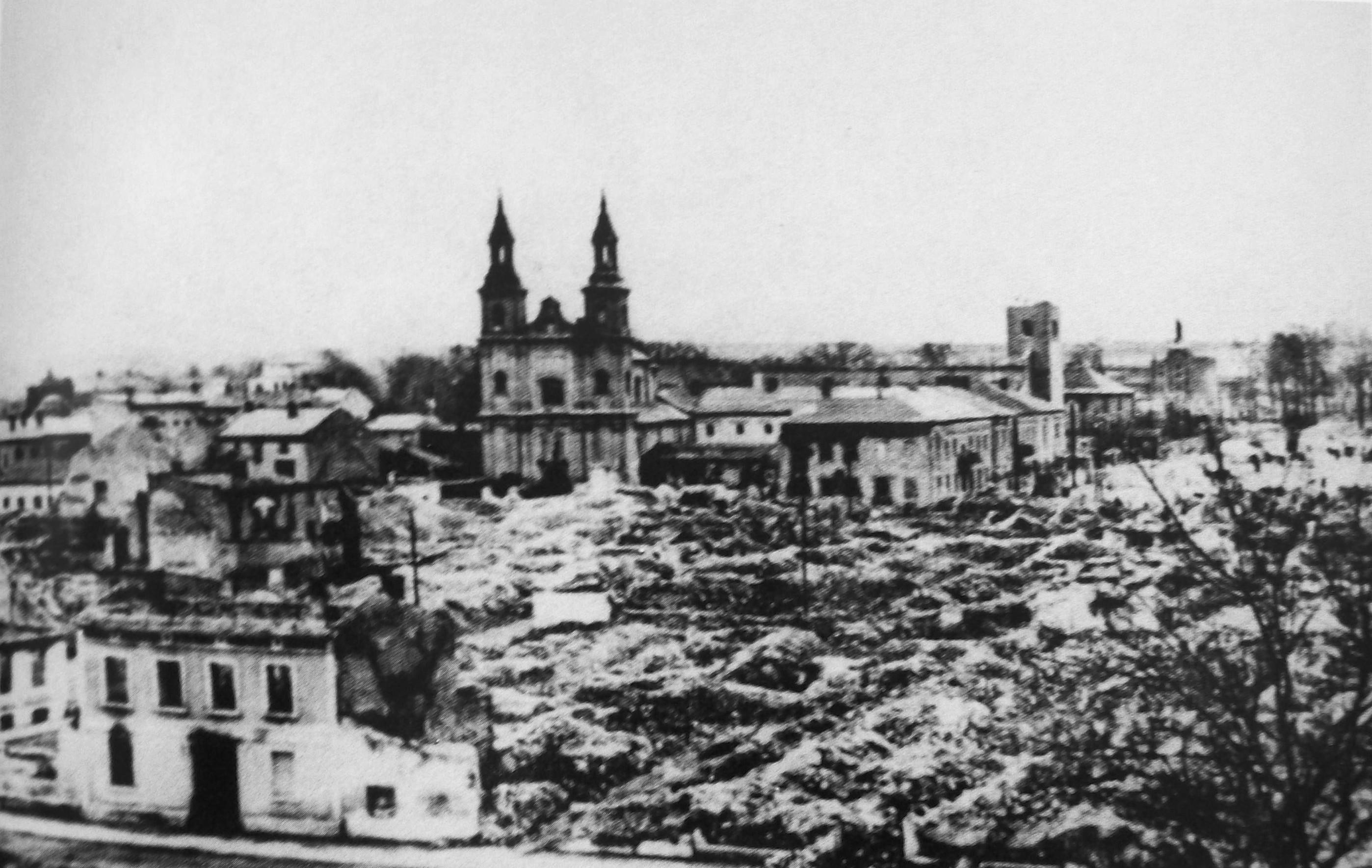
- Wieluń town center after German Luftwaffe bombing on 1 September 1939
Date	1 September 1939
Location	Wieluń, Poland 51°13′6″N 18°34′12″E
Result	Beginning of World War II
Territorial changes	Destruction of civilian infrastructure

Belligerents
Second Polish Republic	Nazi Germany

Commanders and leaders
None	Walter Sigel; Friedrich-Karl Freiherr von Dalwigk zu Lichtenfels; Oskar Dinort

Units involved
None	Luftwaffe

Strength
None	Several dozen bombers, mostly Junkers Ju 87B

Casualties and losses
127–500 civilian casualties	None

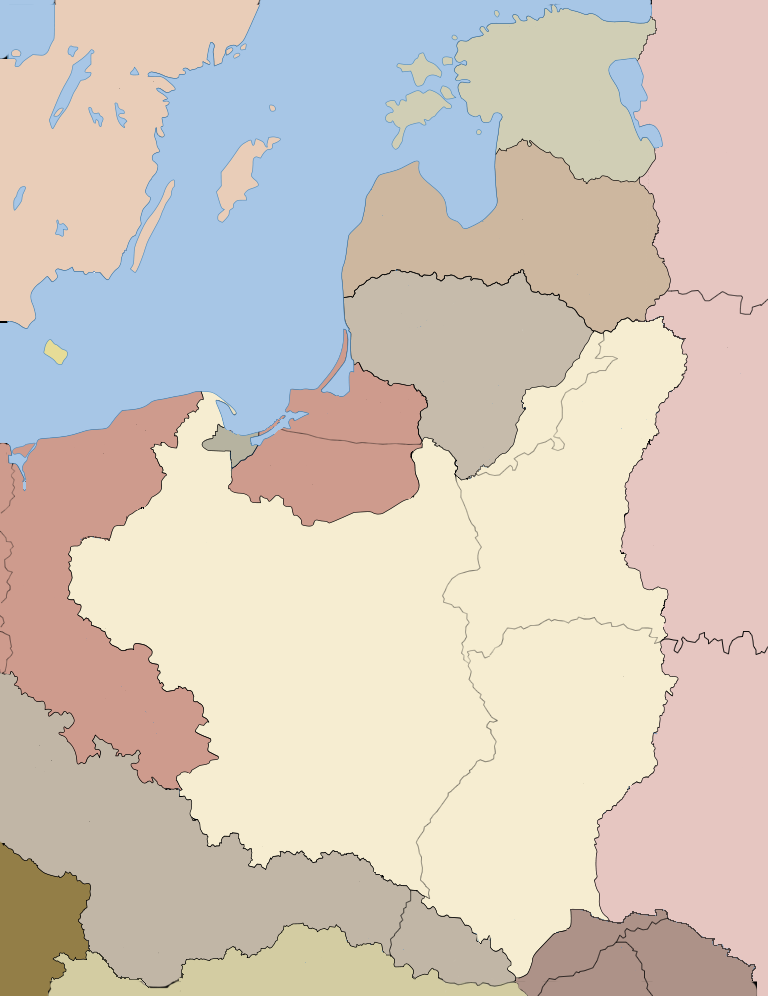
Location of Wieluń
(map before 1939 invasion of Poland)

The bombing of the Polish town of Wieluń on 1 September 1939 is considered by many to be the first major act of World War II and the September Campaign. After German Luftwaffe Junkers Ju 87 planes moved into Polish airspace in the early morning, they reached Wieluń by 04:40–45. Around this time, the first airstrikes on the town were conducted, with a total of 46,000 kg of bombs being dropped on civilian targets for nine hours. Elsewhere, the Battle of Westerplatte and Danzig clashes began around the same time (04:45), starting the well-coordinated Invasion of Poland.

Located near the German border, Wieluń was completely undefended, lacking anti-air capabilities and a military garrison. Despite Wieluń having no military targets, airstrikes continued. German intelligence reports had stated there was a Polish cavalry brigade stationed in the town. The Luftwaffe had reportedly bombed a "clearly marked" hospital, and strafed fleeing civilians, and also bombed the nearby towns of Działoszyn, Radomsko, and Sulejów, which also had no military targets.

In the aftermath, 127 civilian casualties were reported – possibly "several hundred" – but the exact number remains unknown. 70% of the town (90 percent, in the city center) was destroyed.

As the attack on the town happened without a declaration of war, it constituted the first German war crime in World War II, because it violated the 1907 Hague Convention III - Opening of Hostilities prohibiting hostilities against neutral powers without notification of a declaration of war.

== Timing ==
The exact time the first bombs fell on Wieluń on the morning of 1 September 1939 has been a subject of debate, particularly in reference to claims that the town's bombing was the first overt act of World War II, preceding by five minutes the shelling of Westerplatte at 04:45, which has traditionally been considered the opening of the war.

The time given by most Polish sources is 04:40, but this is an average of eyewitness reports on various phases of the initial bombing run, which likely lasted more than a minute. Polish historian Tadeusz Olejnik reports a number of accounts of the first bombs falling as early as 04:30. Another Polish historian, Jan Książek, described 04:40 as a "certainly confirmed" time.

German sources report the time as 05:40, based on German flight documents (Startzeit: 5.02, Angriffzeit: 5.40, Landezeit: 06.05: take-off 05:02, attack 05:40, landing 06:05). The time difference, 04:40 versus 05:40, has been attributed by several writers, such as journalist Joachim Trenkner, to a summer time-difference between Poland and Germany. Other historians, such as Grzegorz Bębnik, disagree that there was a time difference and give the attack time as 05:40; he also cites an eyewitness account giving the attack time as "shortly before 6 a.m." and notes that the eyewitness testimonies are likely unreliable as they were collected in 1961, two years after a commemorative plaque was put up in the town, giving the time as 04:40. He concludes the eyewitnesses were likely influenced by the plaque, which "corrected" their memories. In 2004 the Polish Institute of National Remembrance stated that there was no time difference between Poland and Germany and gave the time of initial bombing as 05:40.

Even if the time 04:40 was to be correct, several historians identify the first (aerial) action of the war as the bombing of the key Tczew bridge in the Pomeranian Corridor by bombers from Sturzkampfgeschwader 1 around 04:30.

== Events ==
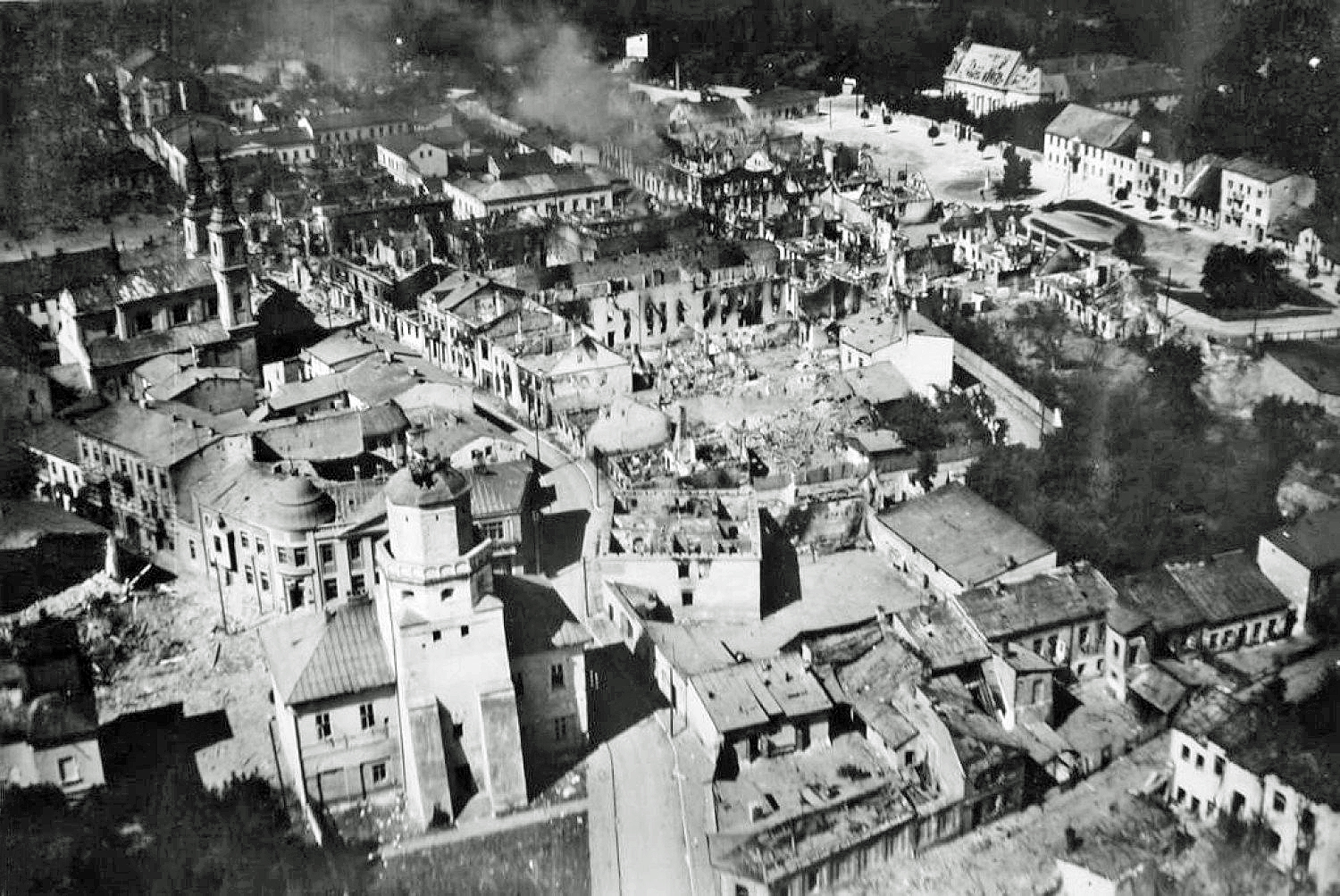
Aerial view of part of the city on 1 September

On 1 September 1939, 29 Junkers Ju 87B Stukas of I group Sturzkampfgeschwader 76, under command of Captain (Hauptmann) Walter Sigel, took off from Nieder-Ellguth airfield. Half an hour later they reached Wieluń unopposed and dropped 29 500-kilogram bombs and 112 50-kilogram bombs. One of the first places hit was the hospital, which likely had Red Cross markings; 32 persons in the hospital were killed. After the hospital began burning, German pilots strafed patients trying to escape the building. Within the hour all 29 aircraft landed back at Nieder-Ellguth, where Sigel reported "no noteworthy observation of the enemy." German pilots reported "blue skies" during the attack and gave detailed descriptions of buildings bombed. After the initial attack, German pilots reported no enemy presence in Wieluń. Two Dornier Do 17 reconnaissance planes that had surveyed the area between 04:50 and 05:02 for Polish military units, reported locating several, the nearest to the town being in a forest 12 kilometres (7.5 mi) southwest of Wieluń.

Several more waves bombed the town; sources vary as to the number. One of the latter waves, described by Piątkowski as the second, of Stuka bombers of I./Sturzkampfgeschwader 77, was commanded by Captain Friedrich-Karl Freiherr von Dalwigk zu Lichtenfels. Książek describes the second wave, which bombed the town at 05:08 (or 06:08, according to the IPN, which does not name its commander, only the unit: I/StG 77), as being commanded by Captain von Schönborn, likewise of Sturzkampfgeschwader 77. II./Sturzkampfgeschwader 77, was actually commanded by Hauptmann Clemens Graf von Schönborn-Wiesentheid.

At 13:00 hours (or 14:00) a third wave of 29 Stukas of Sturzkampfgeschwader 2, commanded by Major Oskar Dinort from Nieder-Ellguth, struck Wieluń. However, Bębnik writes that the third wave, commanded by Major Dinort, bombed the town at around 08:00 and 09:00. This was followed by a fourth wave at about 14:00 hours, commanded by Günter Schwartzkopff, of 60 Ju 87 Stukas of I./Sturzkampfgeschwader 77. Based on German documents, Bębnik concludes that three morning waves and one lighter, afternoon wave of bombing can be confirmed.

The city was bombed with extreme precision, from low altitude due to the absence of air defenses. After the bombing, the Germans strafed fleeing civilians. The town was captured by the German Army on the first day of the invasion.

In all, 380 bombs totaling 46,000 kilograms were dropped on the town, hitting the hospital and destroying 70% of the town's buildings, including as much as 90% in the city center. Other estimates have suggested 75% of buildings destroyed. Casualty estimates vary substantially, as an accurate casualty count does not exist since no comprehensive analysis of damage was carried out until after the war. Early estimates from the People's Republic of Poland gave a number of 2169 fatalities; as time went by they have been revised and lowered. Norman Davies, who cited the number of "1,290 townspeople killed", common in older research, still relatively often reported in modern media, called the casualty rate "more than twice as high as Guernica's or Coventry's". In 2013, historian Piątkowski stated that the number of confirmed casualties is 127 and writes that the estimate of some 1,200 is incorrect as it represents the number of fatalities in all of Wieluń County. A similar conclusion was reached in a 2004 Institute of National Remembrance report, which stated that, while the number of casualties was likely in the range of "several hundred", there are insufficient sources to arrive at a conclusive number, and only 127 have been identified beyond all doubt.

== Purpose ==
Piątkowski writes that some historians, such as Grzegorz Bębnik and Marius Emmerling, describe the bombings as having resulted from faulty reconnaissance or intelligence. German historian Rolf-Dieter Müller writes that, while the town might not have contained military targets, German pilots bombed it due to poor visibility, assuming there were military targets present. Several accounts state that the German command had received reports of the possible presence of Polish cavalry of the Wołyń Cavalry Brigade in the town's vicinity, and at least one German pilot described the bombing of cavalry targets in the town itself. However, other German pilots had reported no military targets present. German historian Jochen Böhler writes that the first operational report by Sturzkampfgeschwader 76 stated there had been "no enemy sightings", a finding corroborated by Poland's Institute of National Remembrance, which concluded there were no Polish military targets or units in the city or vicinity on 1 September or the preceding day—as had already earlier been stated as well by a number of historians.

Most historians agree that the town contained no targets of military value. Historian Timothy Snyder suggests that the civilian population itself may have been the primary target: "The Germans had chosen a locality bereft of military significance as the site of a lethal experiment. Could a modern air force terrorize a civilian population by deliberate bombing?" This view has also been supported by Polish historians Tadeusz Olejnik and Bogumił Rudawski. Another view of a number of historians is that the destruction of the town infrastructure may have been the raids' aim, in order to test the tactics and firepower of the Luftwaffe, in particular of the new Ju 87B bomber. Two weeks before the war began, Germany's Chief of the General Staff Franz Halder mentioned in his war diary a plan called "Offensive Operation Red in the Wieluń area". In the first days of the war, the Luftwaffe launched several further attacks in the area, including on the small towns of Działoszyn and Kamieńsk, and produced aerial photographs of the effectiveness of attacks on other towns.

Halder distinguished in his war diary between "terror attacks" and attacks on military targets. German historian Hans-Erich Volkmann notes that, for the German 10th Army, which was the critical military factor in this section of the front, Wieluń would have had no operational, let alone strategic, importance to justify its bombing. The commander responsible for the Luftwaffe, Wolfram von Richthofen, would have personally ordered the attack. Volkmann, like Böhler, observes that while Richthofen might not have intended it as a "terror attack", he had selected Wieluń as a target close to the border in order to test the capabilities and operational effectiveness of his dive bombers, if possible without losses to his own force. Volkmann characterizes the destruction of Wieluń as an attack on a non-military target and therefore as a war crime. Similar reasons for bombing a defenseless small town are given by historian Norman Davies for the bombing of Frampol two weeks later: "Frampol was chosen partly because it was completely defenceless, and partly because its baroque street plan presented a perfect geometric grid for calculations and measurements."

Piątkowski, analysing the bombing from the perspective of aerial bombardment and international law, concludes that the bombing constituted a violation of a number of war norms, in particular relating to humanitarianism and proportional force. He also discusses the applicability of the term "terror bombing" in the light of a never-adopted 1923 draft convention (The Hague Rules of Air Warfare) that introduced the term. He concludes that, in order to describe the Wieluń raids as terror bombing, documents would have to prove that the real reason for the bombing was the terrorizing of the civilian populace and not a misidentification of military targets.

Legal scholar Antoni Zakrzewski wrote:

Despite the aforementioned debates, Wieluń remains the first assault involving civilian casualties of the Second World War, and many see it as a symbol of Polish suffering during the war. As such, it is being compared to Guernica – a town destroyed in 1937 during the Spanish Civil War, no less but by the same Luftwaffe forces under the command of the field marshal Wolfram Freiherr von Richthofen.

== Major landmarks, damaged or destroyed ==
Targets destroyed by German bombing included:

- The Collegiate Church in Wieluń, built in the 13th–14th centuries
- A mid-19th-century synagogue in Wieluń
- The 14th-century Augustinian cloister in Wieluń
- One wing of the 19th-century castle in Wieluń
- The All Saints Hospital in Wieluń, with a clear Red Cross roof sign, whose bombing killed 32 persons, including 26 patients
- The 15th-century city walls in Wieluń, severely damaged
- Over a dozen historic 18th- and early-19th-century houses

The city hall, with its 14th-century Kraków Gate, survived when a bomb got stuck in the city hall's roof and failed to explode.

== Remembrance ==
The first scholarly study of the bombing was performed in 1961 by Barbara Bojarska, based on her interviews with 14 Polish witnesses.

The attack on Wieluń has been commemorated by several Polish Presidents. In 2004 President Aleksander Kwasniewski unveiled a monument to the city's fallen residents, saying that "here total war was waged, not distinguishing between civilians and military, with the aim of mass extermination." In 2009 President Lech Kaczynski visited, emphasizing that "Wieluń is a symbol of total war." In 2017 President Andrzej Duda visited and "remind[ed] the world that the war started in Poland, on Westerplatte, but that in the first days the highest losses were sustained by civilians, and that Nazi Germany committed atrocities in bombing innocent populations."

The bombing of Wieluń is part of an exhibit at the German Bundeswehr Military History Museum in Dresden.

== Prosecution attempts ==
Two attempts, in 1978 and 1983, to prosecute individuals for the bombing of the Wieluń hospital were dismissed by West German judges when prosecutors stated that, in the morning fog, the pilots had been unable to make out the nature of the structure.

== See also ==
- Battle of Mokra
