= Walter Enneccerus =

- Born: 21 November 1911
- Died: 3 August 1971 (aged 59)
- Military career
- Allegiance: Nazi Germany; West Germany
- Branch: Luftwaffe; German Air Force
- Service years: 1935–45; 1956–67
- Rank: Oberst (Wehrmacht); Brigadegeneral (Bundeswehr)
- Unit: StG 2
- Commands: StG 77
- Conflicts: World War II
- Awards: Knight's Cross of the Iron Cross

Walter Rudolf Enneccerus (21 November 1911 – 3 August 1971) was an officer in the Luftwaffe during World War II and a recipient of the Knight's Cross of the Iron Cross.

== Awards and decorations ==
- Knight's Cross of the Iron Cross on 21 July 1940 as Hauptmann and Gruppenkommandeur of the II./Sturzkampfgeschwader 2 "Immelmann"

Military offices
Preceded by Major Alfons Orthofer	Commander of Sturzkampfgeschwader 77; 13 October 1942 – 20 February 1943	Succeeded by Major Helmut Bruck
