= Helmut Mahlke =

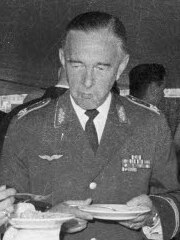
- Mahlke aboard Bayern in 1966
- Born: 27 August 1913; Berlin
- Died: 26 December 1998 (aged 85); Heikendorf
- Military career
- Allegiance: Weimar Republic (to 1933); Nazi Germany (to 1945); West Germany
- Branch: Reichsmarine; Luftwaffe; German Air Force
- Service years: 1932–45; 1956–70
- Rank: Oberstleutnant (Wehrmacht); Generalleutnant (Bundeswehr)
- Units: cruiser Köln; StG 1 Luftflotte 6
- Commands: III./StG 1
- Conflicts: See battles World War II: Annexation of the Sudetenland; Annexation of the Memel Territory; Norwegian Campaign; Battle of Britain; Invasion of Yugoslavia; Battle of Greece; Battle of Crete; Eastern Front
- Awards: Knight's Cross of the Iron Cross

Helmut Adalbert Mahlke (27 August 1913 – 26 December 1998) was a highly decorated Oberstleutnant in the Luftwaffe during World War II, and a recipient of the Knight's Cross of the Iron Cross, the highest award in the military and paramilitary forces of Nazi Germany during World War II.

== Awards and decorations ==
- Front Flying Clasp of the Luftwaffe in Gold
- Iron Cross (1939)
  - 2nd Class (16 April 1940)
  - 1st Class (21 June 1940)
- Wound Badge (1939) in Silver
- Eastern Front Medal (15 June 1942)
- Knight's Cross of the Iron Cross on 16 July 1941 as Hauptmann and Gruppenkommandeur of the III./Sturzkampfgeschwader 1
- German Cross in Gold on 31 March 1944 as Major im Generalstab (in the General Staff) in Luftflotte 6

== Works ==
- Mahlke, Helmut (1993), Stuka Angriff: Sturzflug, Mittler Verlag, ISBN 978-3-8132-0425-4.

Military offices
Preceded by Unknown	Gruppenkommandeur of III./StG 1; 9 July 1940 – 19 September 1941	Succeeded by Major Peter Graßmann
