= Polska Wieś, Poznań County =

Polska Wieś
- Village
- Location within Poland
- Coordinates: 52°29′N 17°18′E
- Country: Poland
- Voivodeship: Greater Poland
- County: Poznań
- Gmina: Pobiedziska

Polska Wieś ([ˈpɔlska ˈvjɛɕ]; German: Forbach) is a village in the administrative district of Gmina Pobiedziska, within Poznań County, Greater Poland Voivodeship, in west-central Poland.

== Notable residents ==
- Günter Schwartzkopff (1898–1940), Luftwaffe general
