= Günter Schwartzkopff =

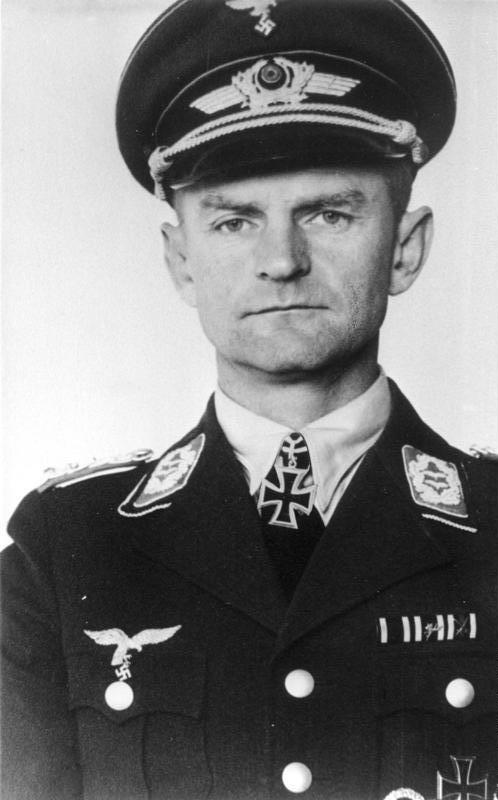
- Born: 5 August 1898; Forbach, German Empire
- Died: 14 May 1940 (aged 41); Châtillon-sur-Bar, France
- Military career
- Allegiance: German Empire; Weimar Republic; Nazi Germany
- Branch: Prussian Army; Luftstreitkräfte; Reichsheer; Luftwaffe
- Service years: 1914–1940
- Rank: Generalmajor (Posthumously)
- Commands: StG 77
- Conflicts: See battles World War I: Battle of Verdun; World War II: Invasion of Poland; Battle of Belgium; Battle of France †; -
- Awards: Knight's Cross of the Iron Cross

Günter Schwartzkopff (5 August 1898 – 14 May 1940) was an officer in the Luftwaffe during World War II. He was the namesake of the Bundeswehr General Schwartzkopff barracks in Hamburg which was renamed the Generalleutnant-Graf-von-Baudissin-Kaserne in June 1994.

Schwartzkopf was an important figure in the development of the dive-bomber arm in the pre-war Luftwaffe. He is credited with the title "Father of the Stuka.

He was awarded the Knight's Cross of the Iron Cross on 24 November 1939 and posthumously promoted to Generalmajor. He was killed on 14 May 1940 after his Junkers Ju 87 was shot down during the Battle of France.

== Early life and career, World War I ==
Schwartzkopff was born on 5 August 1898 in Forbach (now Polska Wieś) in the German Empire. In October 1914, he joined the military service in the Heer as a Fahnenjunker (officer cadet), serving with Infanterie-Regiment Nr. 41, an infantry regiment of the 1st Division. Schwartzkopff joined the Fliegertruppe in 1916 after being badly wounded in the Battle of Verdun in World War I.

== World War II and legacy ==
On 14 May 1940, Schwartzkoff and his radio operator Feldwebel Heinz Follmer were killed in action in their Junkers Ju 87 B-2 (Werknummer 5328—factory number) while flying a ground attack mission south-west of Le Chesne. They were either shot down by anti-aircraft artillery, or by Hawker Hurricane fighters from No. 1 or No. 73 Squadron, near Châtillon-sur-Bar. Schwartzkopff was buried at the German war cemetery at Noyers-Pont-Maugis. Posthumously, he was awarded the Knight's Cross of the Iron Cross (Ritterkreuz des Eisernen Kreuzes) on 24 November 1940, and promoted to Generalmajor in June 1944, the promotion backdated to 1 May 1940.

The Air Force School of the Bundeswehr (Federal Armed Forces) in Hamburg was named General Schwartzkopff barracks in April 1965. The school was renamed in June 1994 to Lieutenant General Graf von Baudissin barracks. A lecture hall was named after him instead.

== Awards and decorations ==
- Knight's Cross of the Iron Cross on 24 November 1940 as Oberst and Geschwaderkommodore of Sturzkampfgeschwader 77

Military offices
Preceded by Oberstleutnant Hans-Hugo Witt	Gruppenkommandeur of IV. (Stuka)Gruppe/LG 1; 1 November 1938 – 1 June 1939	Succeeded by Hauptmann Peter Kögl
Preceded by None	Geschwaderkommodore of Sturzkampfgeschwader 77; 1 May 1939 – 1 May 1940	Succeeded by Major Clemens Graf von Schönborn-Wiesentheid
