= Helmut Bruck =

- Born: 16 February 1913
- Died: 25 August 2001 (aged 88)
- Military career
- Allegiance: Nazi Germany
- Branch: Luftwaffe
- Service years: 1935–45
- Rank: Oberst
- Commands: StG 77; SG 77; SG 151
- Conflicts: World War II
- Awards: Knight's Cross of the Iron Cross with Oak Leaves

Helmut Bruck (16 February 1913 – 25 August 2001) was a German pilot during World War II. He was a recipient of the Knight's Cross of the Iron Cross with Oak Leaves of Nazi Germany. During his career he flew 973 missions.

== Awards and decorations ==
- Iron Cross (1939) 2nd Class (13 September 1939) & 1st Class (21 May 1940)
- German Cross in Gold on 20 October 1942 as Hauptmann in the I./Sturzkampfgeschwader 77
- Knight's Cross of the Iron Cross with Oak Leaves
  - Knight's Cross on 4 September 1941 as Hauptmann and Staffelkapitän in the 1./Sturzkampfgeschwader 77
  - Oak Leaves on 19 February 1943 as Hauptmann and Gruppenkommandeur of the I./Sturzkampfgeschwader 77

Military offices
Preceded by Major Walter Enneccerus	Commander of Sturzkampfgeschwader 77; 20 February 1943 – 18 October 1943	Succeeded by Unit reorganized as Schlachtgeschwader 77
Preceded by Previously Sturzkampfgeschwader 77	Commander of Schlachtgeschwader 77; 18 October 1943 – 16 February 1945	Succeeded by Oberstleutnant Manfred Mossinger
Preceded by Oberst Karl Christ	Commander of Schlachtgeschwader 151; 7 December 1944 – 1 April 1945	Succeeded by Major Karl Henze
