= Schlachtgeschwader 77 =

- Active: 1943–1945
- Country: Nazi Germany
- Branch: Luftwaffe
- Type: Dive bomber
- Role: Close air support
- Size: Air Force Wing

Insignia
- Identification symbol: S2

Schlachtgeschwader 77 (SG 77) was a Luftwaffe close air support Geschwader during World War II. It was formed on 18 October 1943 in Wassilkow from Stab/Sturzkampfgeschwader 77. I. Group was formed by redesignating I./StG 77, II. Group from I./Schlachtgeschwader 1 and III. Group from III./StG 77. On 3 March 1945, 9. Staffel equipped its Fw 190F-8s with Panzerblitz 80 mm anti-tank rockets. Adapted from the R4M rocket, these were carried under the outboard wings.

== Commanding officers ==
- Major Helmut Bruck, 18 October 1943 – 15 February 1945
- Obstleutnant Manfred Mossinger, 16 February 1945 – 8 May 1945

== Bibliography ==
- Arthy, Andrew (October 2021). "Last Days of the Cannon Birds: Luftwaffe Junkers Ju 87G Anti-tank Operations, Eastern Front, April-May 1945". The Aviation Historian (37): 20–28. ISSN 2051-1930.
- de Zeng, Henry L., IV; Stankey, Douglas G. (2013). Dive-Bomber and Ground-Attack Units of the Luftwaffe 1933-1945. Vol. 2. Hersham, UK: Classic Publications. ISBN 978-1-906537-09-8.
