= Sturzkampfgeschwader 77 =

- Unit emblem of StG 77
- Active: 1 May 1939 – 18 October 1943
- Country: Germany
- Allegiance: Nazi Germany
- Branch: Luftwaffe
- Type: Dive bomber
- Role: Close air support Offensive counter air Maritime interdiction Anti-tank warfare
- Size: Air Force Wing
- Engagements: World War II

Commanders
- Notable commanders: Günter Schwartzkopff

Insignia
- Identification symbol: Geschwaderkennung of S2

Sturzkampfgeschwader 77 (StG 77) was a Luftwaffe dive bomber wing during World War II. From the outbreak of war, StG 77 distinguished itself in every Wehrmacht major operation until the Battle of Stalingrad in 1942. If the claims made by StG 77 are accurate, it inflicted more damage to enemy ground forces than any other wing. It operated the Junkers Ju 87 dive-bomber exclusively in the combat role. The Dornier Do 17 and Messerschmitt Bf 110 were both used in the air reconnaissance role.

Founded in May 1939, StG 77 entered the war with only two of the usual three groups assigned to a Luftwaffe combat wing. It supported the invasion of Poland in September 1939 which opened the conflict. In May and June 1940, it operated in the interdiction, close air support and anti-shipping role supporting Army Group A and Army Group B in the Battle of the Netherlands, Battle of Belgium and Battle of France. In June 1940 a third group was added. Beginning in July 1940, it fought in the Battle of Britain, but the Ju 87-equipped wings were removed from the battle after just five weeks. StG 77 flew against British shipping until the winter, 1940/1941.

StG 77 then moved to the Balkans. It operated in the battle for air superiority, anti-shipping, interdiction and close support role in the Invasion of Yugoslavia, Battle of Greece and Battle of Crete in April and May 1941. The wing inflicted heavy losses on shipping with StG 1, StG 2 and StG 3. StG 77 supported Army Group Centre and Army Group South on the Eastern Front, from June 1941, after Operation Barbarossa. In particular, it served with distinction in the Battle of Uman, Battle of Kiev, Crimean Campaign, Second Battle of Kharkov, Battle of the Caucasus and ultimately the Battle of Stalingrad.

In its final year, StG 77 continued close air support operations in support of the Centre and Southern army groups, but began to operate more specifically in the anti-tank role with the introduction of the Ju 87G variant; specifically armed to engage Soviet armour. It fought at the Battle of Kursk in July 1943 and the subsequent retreat to the Dnieper; its final battle.

In October 1943, the Stuka wings were reorganised. They were renamed Schlachtgeschwader (battle wings) as opposed to dive-bomber wings (Sturzkampfgeschwader). The Ju 87s had become too vulnerable, and there were no longer sufficient fighter aircraft to provide escort, or enough fuel for joint operations. The number of dive-bombers was scaled down, and mixed with fighter-bombers, particularly Focke-Wulf Fw 190, which could fight on equal terms after it released its bombs.

The wing ceased to exist on 18 October 1943. II. Gruppe was re-designated as III. Gruppe Schlachtgeschwader 10, the remaining groups renamed and sent to Schlachtgeschwader 77.

== Background ==
The dive-bomber has often been associated with German development in the pre-war era but the type remained a low-priority for air planners who shaped the embryonic Luftwaffe. This apparent regression from the practices and experiences of World War I stemmed from the belief among the General Staff (Oberkommando der Luftwaffe) that army support aviation in 1917–1918 was purely a reaction to trench warfare.

German air doctrine remained rooted in the fundamentals of Operativer Luftkrieg (Operational Air War) which stressed interdiction, strategic bombing (when and if possible) but primarily the air supremacy mission. The Spanish Civil War experience encouraged the General Staff to embrace the dive-bomber concept later in the 1930s, though the war's influence on German operational preferences remain ambiguous. On the eve of World War II, some German air planners regarded the dive-bomber as a strategic weapon to strike with precision at enemy industry. Even factored into the army support groups, only fifteen percent of Luftwaffe front-line strength contained specialist ground-attack aircraft in September 1939.

The Ju 87-equipped units made up only four complete wings of around 300 aircraft in September 1939, StG 77 being one of them. Two other StG existed, but only with a single group, while LG 1 maintained another in a mixed wing. The Ju 87s, commensurate with doctrine, participated in a variety of missions; the battle for air superiority, interdiction as well as the traditional ground support role for which it is known.

== Formation ==
Stab (headquarters unit)/StG 77 was formed at Schweinfurt on 1 May 1939 from Stab./StG 51. Initially placed under Luftflotte 3, it transferred to Luftflotte 4 which used the designation numbers 76-100, as consequently was renamed.

Oberst Günter Schwartzkopff was appointed as the first Geschwaderkommodore. From 1 June 1939 it transferred to Breslau-Schöngarten, present-day Wrocław Airport, and then from 26 and 31 August moved to Neudorf. It maintained three operational Ju 87s when war began.

I./ StG 77 was formed from I./StG 51 at Kitzingen on 14 May 1939. It moved to Brieg and Hauptmann Karl-Friedrich-Karl von Dalwigk zu Lichtenfels in command. On 31 August 1939, the eve of war, it possessed 39 Ju 87s, of which 34 were combat ready.

II./StG 77 was formed on 14 May 1939 also from II./StG 51 was its renumbering pattern followed first group. It was moved into the same base as Stab./StG 77. Hauptmann Clemens Graf von Schonborn-Wiesentheid was given command. 38 of 39 Ju 87s were operational by August 1939.

III./StG 77 was formed during World War II. It was presumably formed at Barly, near Arras or alternatively at Caen in Normandy on 9 July 1940. Dietrich Peltz was given command. 37 of the 38 Ju 87s assigned to the group were operational when combat operations began. By that time Helmuth Bode had taken command as the group's commanding officer.

== War Service ==
StG 77 was placed under the command of Fliegerführer z.b.V., under Wolfram von Richthofen, part of Luftflotte 4. During the course of the campaign, the two groups were reinforced by III./StG 51 and IV.(St)/LG 1. The Stab, I. and II. Gruppe were ordered to support the 10th Army as it advanced into southern Poland. On 1 September 1939 German forces invaded Poland, forcing the Western Allies to declare war, and thus beginning World War II. Before the campaign began, on 28 August 1939, Slovak forces threatened to mutiny in protest at the German attack and briefly threatened Spišská Nová Ves airfield where Stab. and II./StG 77 were housed. The perimeter was secured by paratroops. By the time of the German attack StG 77 had moved onto bases around Oppeln.

=== Poland ===
On 1 September many of the crews of I./StG 77 flew four or five combat missions. With assistance from I./StG 2 and I./KG 77, first group assisted in the destruction of the Łódź Army's cavalry brigades (Wołyńska Cavalry Brigade). The attacks offered close air support to the mechanised XVI Corps. II./StG 77 attacked Wieluń, destroying the town. The entire wing was involved in Offensive counter air operations against airfields.

From 2 to 3 September troop concentrations in the Radomsko region were bombed. First group also probably hit targets along the Pilica river. That day Richthofen's units destroyed the 7th Polish Division. On 4 September StG 77, with KG 4, KG 55, KG 76 and KG 77 were used against rail and road traffic in support of the 4th Army. The attacks were so successful that there were a shortage of targets.

On 6 September I./StG 77 hit targets in the Warsaw area for the first time. Second group supported the advance to the Vistula and moved to Kruszyna. From 8 to 13 September the group took part in the Battle of Radom, in which six Polish divisions were destroyed from 8 to 13 September. It also reduced the Iłża pocket. I./StG 77 supported the Radom battle until 11 September, when it was pulled out to attack positions near Warsaw. It also reduced the Iłża pocket.

The Battle of the Bzura had stalled the advance on Warsaw. The 10th Army managed to reach its suburbs by 8 September and StG 77 flew 140 sorties with III./StG 151 against bridges while KG 77 cut the rail lines. Richthofen's men flew 750 sorties and dropped 388 tons of bombs. The air action destroyed remaining resistance, allowing the army to mop up. StG 77 was also used in the Siege of Warsaw. The two groups attacked bunkers, fortress' from 14 to 27 September. They assisted with the destruction of Modlin Fortress, allowing it to be stormed. StG 77 returned to Brieg after the Polish surrender on 6 October 1939.

During the Phoney War StG 77 remained with Richthofen but was placed into the VIII. Fliegerkorps. The air corps was attached to Luftflotte 2. The air corps Richthofen commanded had the majority of Ju 87 units. This powerful close support force was ordered to support Army Group A's break-out from the Ardennes and advance to the English Channel. It was also to support Army Group B in Belgium.

The groups spent the winter, 1939/40 in training. The Stab unit was equipped with six Dornier Do 17M reconnaissance aircraft at Cologne. It had three of four Ju 87s operational. First group had 31 aircraft operational (of 39) and second group fielded 38 of 39 Ju 87s. The latter had three Do 17s to assist with target-spotting. The fast-moving advance and developing situation required constant intelligence on Allied movements. Air officers placed with German armoured and mechanised divisions could call upon air support via radio within 45 to 75 minutes.

=== France and Low Countries ===
All three units opened the Battle of Belgium and Battle of the Netherlands with attacks against fortresses on 10 May 1940. Eben Emael was accurately bombed and assisted the paratroopers in the Battle of Fort Eben-Emael. StG 77 also assisted in the Battle of Maastricht as the German army seized vital bridgeheads. First group, with III./StG 2, II(S)/LG 2 and front-line artillery units provided covering fire, the bridges at Vroenhoven and Veldwezelt were captured, but remained under Belgian Army fire for a day.

On 11 May StG 77 assisted Richthoffen's former command, now under Richard Putzier, against Dutch airfields. StG 77 was involved in the Battle for the Hague later in the day, when Richthofen threw in half of his force to assist heard-pressed German paratroops. I./StG 77 moved to Aachen on 11 May and supported the 6th Army's crossing of the Meuse. The following day it attacked targets in the Liège area. Stab. and I./StG 77 moved to Rocroi, near Charleville-Mézières to keep up with the advance. II./StG 77 operated in the Tirlemont area also on 13 May, losing two Ju 87s. First group attacked positions around Namur on 15 and 16 May.

StG 77 also contributed to the Battle of Sedan. It was the first major operation of the wing in the Battle of France. StG 77's air corps flew 360 attacks against French Army positions on 13 May. The dive-bombing attacks by StG 77 on French artillery positions were particularly effective. On 14 May StG 77 lost commanding officer Günter Schwartzkopff shot down and killed by ground-fire near Sedan. Clemens Graf von Schönborn-Wiesentheid replaced him. First group lost three of four Ju 87s over Sedan to Royal Air Force (RAF) fighters on this day. StG 77 lost five destroyed and two damaged in the Sedan operation.

StG 77 played an important role in breaking up the French attacks on Army Group A's flanks as it extended a corridor through northern France. On 19 May Charles de Gaulle's 4e Division cuirassée was defeated at the Battle of Montcornet. The fragmentation bombs were particularly devastating, blowing off the tank tracks. The losses to the division are unknown, but it was mauled.

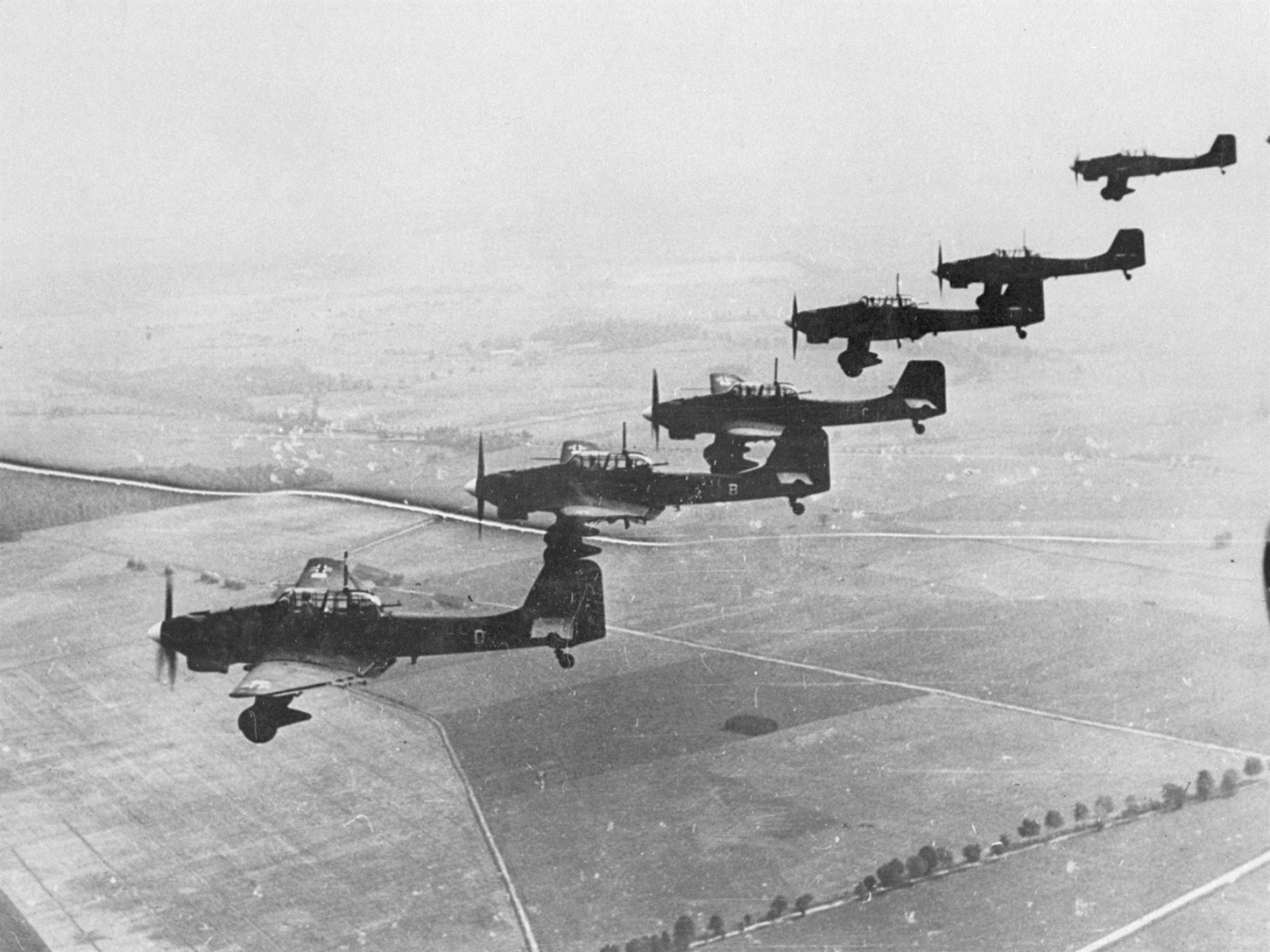
Ju 87 Bs. StG 77 operated the Ju 87 exclusively in the combat role. A small number of Do 17s were used for target-spotting.

Merville airfield was subjected to an attack by I. or II./StG 77 on 22 May. The wing lost four Ju 87s in battle with 145 and No. 151 Squadron RAF. On the same day II./StG 77 attacked road traffic near Montreuil and Saint-Omer on 21 and 22 May. One more was lost in support operations on 25 May. I./StG 77 followed up the victory at Arras, by attacking troop concentrations north of the town. While StG 1 and KG 77 attacked French armoured forces pressuring the German flank near Amiens, StG 77 carried out effective counter-artillery raids near Saint Quentin on 25 May.

From 22 May StG 77 was concentrated against the Channel ports. On 23 May Hugo Sperrle requested StG 77 support against Boulogne. The wing came into frequent contact with No. 11 Group RAF operating from England. Richthofen lost 16 aircraft—five from StG 77 on 22 May alone. It supported the 10th Panzer Division in capture of Boulogne. The wing was based at Sint-Truiden by 21 May, Schönborn-Wiesentheid requested fuel because the reserves were exhausted. Except food, of which there was a five-day stock argumented by captured loot, the Luftwaffe experienced supply shortages.

On 23 May the French destroyer Orage was crippled by I./StG 77 and had to be scuttled. The Frondeur was damaged. StG 77 also supported the siege of Calais. The town was reduced to rubble on Richthofen's orders and StG 77 received support from StG 2 and received escort from JG 27. HMS Whitshed was damaged by a near-miss in the same action, but by which StG is not known. Bombs falling near the quayside caused heavy casualties and British forces were evacuated.

StG 77 began operations against Dunkirk after the fall of Calais. In the Battle of Dunkirk, Ju 87s bombed the port and attacked Allied shipping evacuating the encircled British and French armies. With StG 1 and 2 the Ju 87s inflicted significant losses on the Royal Navy and French Navy. Côte d'Azur, a 3,047-ton cross-channel steamer was sunk on 27 May followed by the paddle steamer Crested Eagle on 28 May. On 29 May the Royal Navy destroyer HMS Grenade was severely damaged by a Ju 87 attack within Dunkirk's harbour, and subsequently sank. The French destroyer Mistral was crippled by bomb damage the same day. Jaguar and Verity were badly damaged while the trawlers Calvi and Polly Johnson (363 and 290 tons) disintegrated under bombardment. The merchant ship Fenella (2,376 tons) was sunk having taken on 600 soldiers. The attacks brought the evacuation to a halt for a time. The rail ships Lorina and Normannia (1,564 and 1,567 tons) were sunk also.

On 1 June the Ju 87s sank the Skipjack (815 tons) while the destroyer Keith was sunk and Basilisk was crippled before being scuttled by Whitehall. Whitehall was later badly damaged and along with Ivanhoe, staggered back to Dover. Havant, commissioned for just three weeks, was sunk and in the evening the French destroyer Foudroyant sank after a mass-attack. Further victories against shipping were claimed before nightfall on 1 June. The steamer Pavon was lost while carrying 1,500 Dutch soldiers most of whom were killed. The oil tanker Niger was also destroyed. A flotilla of French minesweepers were also lost—Denis Papin (264 tons), the Le Moussaillon (380 tons) and Venus (264 tons).

The wing supported Fall Rot–the end phase–of the campaign. At first StG 77 supported the push toward Paris, which fell on 14 June after the French government declared it an open city. Then events moved rapidly. It supported Army Group A and C as they moved to surround the Maginot Line and assisted the advance across the Somme, Seine and Loire to the French border with Switzerland. First group supported operations much further west and ended the campaign on 18 June, after attacking enemy concentrations at Auxerre. Second group's operations paralleled the first; although on 13 June Esternay railway station was bombed by it. It stood down from 18 June.

After the Armistice of 22 June 1940 StG 77 was afforded eight to ten days rest before moving to Caen in Normandy.

=== Battle of Britain ===
During June and July 1940, a third group was founded in Normandy which increased the strength of the wing to approximately, just over 100 aircraft. I./StG 77 moved to Cherbourg-en-Cotentin before operations commenced against the United Kingdom. It lost one Staffel to Erprobungsgruppe 210 (Test Wing 210) and received another. III./StG 77 was formed from II.(St)/KG 76 and I./StG 76 but would not be ready for deployment until mid-August. When it entered combat it had all but one of its 38 Ju 87s operational. StG 77 remained under the command of VIII. Fliegerkorps.

StG 77 then participated in early part of the Battle of Britain. As a prelude to destroying RAF Fighter Command and establishing air superiority for Operation Sea Lion, the Luftwaffe began by attacking shipping in the English Channel. To the Germans, this became known as the Kanalkampf, and to the British as the convoy battle.

On 9 July 1940 the Germans attacked the convoy routes in force. The last sorties of the day were flown by 27 I./StG 77 Ju 87s, led by Hauptmann Friedrich-Karl Lichtenfels, escorted by Bf 110s, which attacked the Portland naval base. Intercepted by 609 Squadron, Lichtenfels was killed with his gunner and a Spitfire pilot was killed by the Bf 110 escort; Lichtenfels was a Knight's Cross of the Iron Cross holder and experienced pilot. A Bf 110 escort from 13./LG 1 was also lost. The 7,085 gross register tons (GRT) freighter Empire Daffodil was damaged. Lichtenfels was replaced by Hauptmann Herbert Meisel. On 18 July the wing lost a Do 17 reconnaissance aircraft while scouting for targets.

Early on 27 July a large convoy named BACON departed Portland and 30 Ju 87s from I./StG 77 took off from Caen at 08:00, picking up their Bf 109 escort from JG 27 en route. No. 10 Group RAF dispatched three Hurricanes from RAF Middle Wallop. One Ju 87 was shot down before the Bf 109s intervened. Meanwhile, BACON reached Swanage at 09:45 and a second wave of Ju 87s arrived to attack the ships. Nine RAF fighters tried to intercept but failed and lost a 610 Squadron pilot killed.

On 8 August StG 77 was involved in large air battles as Richthofen's air corps attempted to destroy Convoy PEEWIT. In the late morning StG 2, 3 and 77 from Angers, Caen and St. Malo, escorted by Bf 110s from V./LG 1, attacked the convoy south of the Isle of Wight, with about 30 Bf 109s from II. and III./JG 27 for high cover. Spitfires of 609 Squadron and Hurricanes from 257 and 145 squadrons attacked the German formations, joined later by 238 Squadron. The Ju 87s severely damaged SS Surte, MV Scheldt and SS Omlandia and sank SS Balmaha soon after. SS Tres was sunk by StG 77; four ships were sunk and four were damaged in the attacks.

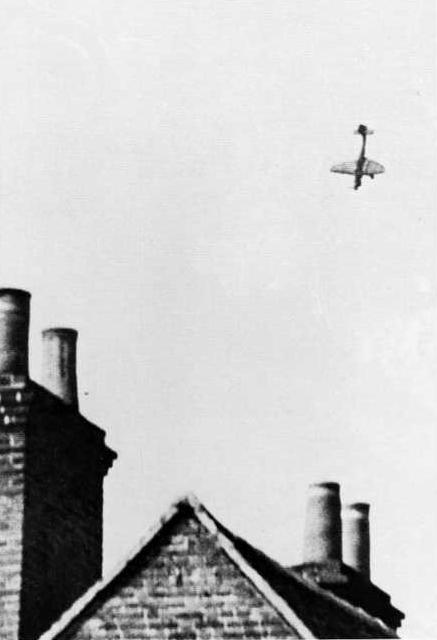
One of StG 77s 18 August casualties: Unteroffizier August Dann and Erich Kohl were killed.

After StG 1 had trouble finding the convoy because of cloud, Hauptmann Waldemar Plewig the commander of II./StG 77 used his discretion to fly over the convoy from Le Havre in the unit Do 17P reconnaissance aircraft and found the conditions good enough for an attack and 82 Ju 87s from III./StG 1, I./StG 3 and Stab, II./StG 77 were alerted. The ships of CW 9 sailed on and the anti-submarine yachts HMS Wilna, HMS Rion, trawlers HMS Cape Palliser, Kingston Chrysoberyl, Kingston Olivine and Stella Capella were attacked, having been sent to rescue survivors from the first sinkings. Cape Palliser and Rion were badly damaged; Fighter Command sent 145 Squadron and 43 Squadron to defend the convoy. Three StG 77 Stukas were shot down by 145 Squadron and four were damaged by 43 Squadron (two were 70 percent and 80 damaged).

On 13 August Adlertag, the offensive to destroy Fighter Command, began. Poor communications and weather caused chaos. Cancellation orders did not reach Luftflotte 3 HQ. Hugo Sperrle ordered attacks to commence. At 05:50, 88 Ju 87s of StG 77 began heading for Portland Harbour. In the afternoon, escorted by JG 27 Bf 109s, StG 77s 52 Ju 87s targeted RAF Warmwell. The Geschwader failed to find its target, dropping its bombs at random. The other Ju 87 units had attracted much attention that day and StG 77 escaped unnoticed.

On 18 August 1940 the Ju 87s were withdrawn from the battle for air superiority after heavy casualties sustained on this date. StG 77 suffered the brunt of the losses. RAF Ford, RAF Thorney Island, Gosport and CH station at Poling were believed to be the targets. German records suggest Littlehampton was the target, not the Poling station.

The airfields belonged to RAF Coastal Command and Fleet Air Arm. StG 77 committed 109 dive-bombers to the raid. It was the largest concentration of Ju 87s to operate over Britain. I./StG 77 were to strike at Thorney Island with 28 Ju 87s; 28 II./StG 77 were assigned to Ford; and 31 III./StG 77 Ju 87s were to destroy Poling radar station. The dive-bombers were supported by 157 Bf 109s; 70 from JG 27; 32 from JG 53 acting as close escort; and 55 from JG 2.

Poling was so badly damaged it was out of action for the rest of August but the British filled the gap with mobile stations. II./StG 77 were able to attack Ford with complete confidence. Bombs rained down on huts, hangars, building and among aircraft drawn up together for maintenance. Early on bombs struck the field's oil tanks and storage compounds causing an enormous blaze which contributed to the crippling damage on the airfield.

The 28 aircraft of I./StG 77 were attacked by Nos. 43 and 601 Squadron sporting a force of 18 Hurricanes. The escorting Bf 109s from II./JG 27 were flying too far away and could not stop the Hurricanes making an attack before the Ju 87s made their dives. Three Ju 87s were shot down in exchange for a damaged Hurricane, hit by return fire. Some hangars were hit and much damage done. As the Bf 109 escorts turned to meet the two engaging RAF Squadrons, around 300 aircraft filled a patch of sky 25 miles long, from Gosport to Bognor Regis.

The lack of protection for I./StG 77 had cost it 10 Ju 87s with one damaged beyond repair. Total manpower losses for the unit amounted to 17 killed or mortally wounded, six wounded and five captured out of 56 men. II./StG 77 lost three Ju 87s to fighter attack and one damaged beyond repair, five crewmen dead and one captured. III./StG 77 also lost two Ju 87s and two damaged with four men killed. StG 77s human casualties amounted to 26 killed, six taken prisoner, and six wounded. The price was too high and with the exception of sporadic attacks on convoys later in the year, the Ju 87 played no further part in the Battle of Britain. Among the dead was Herbert Meisel, commanding officer of II./StG 77. Helmut Bruck replaced him.

=== Balkans campaign ===
StG 77 was assigned to Luftflotte 4 in preparation for the Invasion of Yugoslavia. Stab, I and III./StG 77 were moved to Arad in northwest Romania. First group fielded 39 Ju 87s, with 33 operational. Third group was based in the same area with 32 of 40 aircraft ready for operations. The Stab. unit had three available dive-bombers. II./StG 77 was assigned to Graz-Thalerhof with 34 of 39 Ju 87s ready for combat.

The first and third group were active in Operation Retribution, the bombing of Belgrade. StG 77 hit pinpoint targets in and around the capital, including the Royal Palace, with 74 dive-bombers and a second wave of 57 Ju 87s against the Smedervo bridge and fortifications at the confluence of the Nera and Morava rivers.

First group mirrored these operations. Second group struck Royal Yugoslav Air Force airfields around Zagreb, Banja Luka, Bihac and Prijedor. It was credited with numerous aircraft destroyed on the ground. Velika Gorcia airfield near Zagreb was attacked and two squadrons of the 4th reconnaissance group were destroyed. 18 Breguet XIX aircraft and some Potez 25s belonging to the IV Army were destroyed. The VII Army's 6 Grupa at Cerklje and Bregue near Brezice, suffered a similar fate. Both attacks were carried out by II./StG 77.

The group lost four Ju 87s. On 11 April 87 Ju 87s attacked Veliki Radinci I airfield, which cost StG 77 two aircraft. On 12 April the Jadija rail junction was destroyed slowing the Yugoslav reaction to the invasion. Relentless air attack caused severe losses to 24 Yugoslav divisions which began to retreat southward. On 12 April, on the Danube, the wing sank the 540-ton monitor Drave.

On 14 April second group moved to Zagreb in the wake of rapid advances on the ground. By that date I./StG 77 hit targets around Pancevo and then Bijeljina in eastern Bosnia and German forces pushed to Sarajevo on 15 April. The bombardment of Pancevo broke the front-line. Only four days into the campaign, on 10 April, III./StG 77 attacked targets in northern Greece (probably the Metaxas Line).

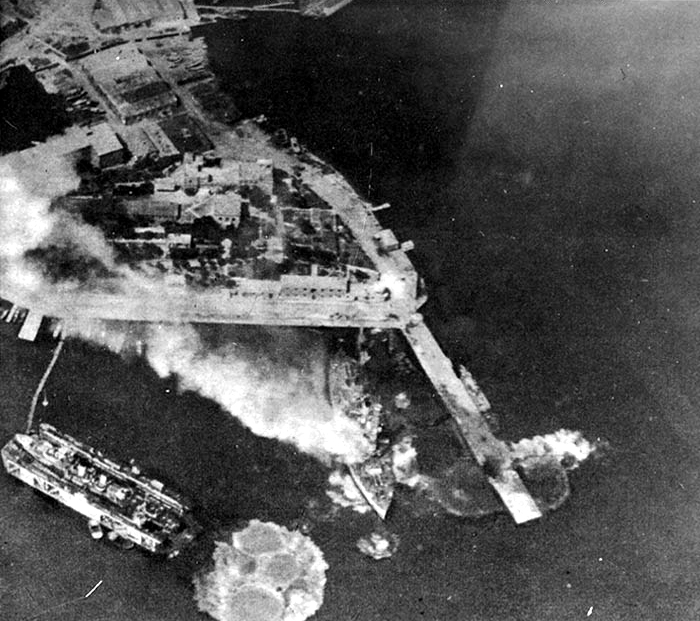
Greek battleship Kilkis under attack at Salamis Naval Base, 23 April 1941. Lower left is the destroyer Vasilefs Georgios. Kilkis was sunk in this attack. Vasilefs Georgios was subsequently raised and taken into German service.

The rapid capitulation of the Yugoslavian Army allowed the Ju 87 groups to turn their attention to ports in the south, to prevent the evacuation of remaining forces or the landing of a British expeditionary force. I./StG 77 moved from Arad to Belgrade-Zemun, with elements detached at Bijeljina, on 19 April. Within a few days the group had moved to support the advance in southern Greece. On 15 May it was based at Argos with II./StG 77. III./StG 77 moved south quickly. On 15 April it was based at Prilep-West, south of Skoplje, in Macedonia. The group bombed ground targets and shipping targets in the Athens area on 22 April. Losing one aircraft.

On 27 April it lost one Ju 87 in attacks on HMS Hero, evacuating British forces. The Ju 87s also caused the Slamat disaster. They sank the Dutch troopship Slamat. Costa Rica (8,085 tons), Santa Clara (13,320 tons) and Ulster Prince (3,800 tons) were also sunk. The Royal Navy destroyers HMS Diamond and HMS Wryneck came to the aid of one another, only to be sunk by other German aircraft.

Operations on the Greek mainland ceased on 30 April. StG 77 rested and planned for the next stage of the offensive against Crete. The Battle of Crete opened on 20 May. Ju 87s were ordered to attack defences, ports and airfields on the island. On 21–22 May, the Germans attempted to send in reinforcements to Crete by sea but lost 10 vessels to "Force D" under the command of Rear Admiral Irvine Glennie. The force, consisting of the cruisers HMS Dido, Orion and Ajax, forced the remaining German ships to retreat. The Stukas were called upon to deal with the British naval threat. Elements of StG 77 and I./StG 3 pursued and damaged Orion and Dido. Orion had been evacuating 1,100 soldiers to North Africa; 260 of them were killed and another 280 wounded.

The campaign ended with the fall of Crete on 1 June. III./StG 77 alone claimed 46,000 tons of shipping sunk. It claimed 86,000 tons damaged.

=== Eastern Front ===
After the termination of the Crete operation, StG 77 returned to Poland under the command of II. Fliegerkorps, and attached to Luftflotte 2. It operated on the hinge of Army Group Centre and South.

On 22 June 1941 Operation Barbarossa, the invasion of the Soviet Union, began the war on the Eastern Front. StG 77's first mission was to support the crossing of the Bug River and the breaching of the demarcation line founded by the Nazi-Soviet Pact in 1939. The support helped 17th and 18th Panzer Divisions to make the crossing. StG 77 supported German forces in the Battle of Białystok–Minsk.

StG 77 were moved southward to reinforce the IV. Fliegerkorps in Operation München within days. It supported the 11th Army as it advanced across the Romanian-Soviet border. By 5 July, StG 77 had destroyed 18 trains and 500 vehicles. On 11 July Hauptmann Gustav Pressler was shot down behind Soviet lines but returned within days. Pressler was one of three losses that day. On 12 July two I./StG 77 Ju 87s were shot down while 11 were put out of action after a Soviet air attack against their airfield by the 55 IAP.

StG 77 attacked Soviet supply lines unmolested in the Battle of Uman. On 26 July II./StG 77 lost four Ju 87s while III./StG 77 was assigned to supporting the 11th Army. On 30 July third group lost two Ju 87s against 36 IAD as they attempted to bomb Semyon Timoshenko's headquarters at Kiev. At Uman German air attacks, supported by III./StG 77 accounted for 94 tanks and 148 vehicles.

In an effort to encircle the Soviet 26th Army, StG 77 were ordered to bomb the Kaniv bridges across the Dniepr. The attacks failed and the bridges only fell when the Soviet rearguards blew them up upon their withdrawal in mid-August. StG 77 did contribute heavily to the Battle of Kiev. Luftflotte 4, to which the IV. Fliegerkorps was attached, began to suffer fuel shortages as the pocket closed. It was decided to use the less thirsty Ju 87s from StG 77. The airmen found the pocket rich with targets. Some 920 vehicles were claimed destroyed. On 18 September 6 Army renewed its offensive against Kiev. StG 77 flew four to six sorties per day in support, bombing artillery, bunker and the citadel positions until the city was captured.

Further south II./StG 77 supported the 17th Army in the capture of Poltava on 18 September. Elements of StG 77, in particular, 6. Staffel (squadron), were involved in repulsing counter-attacks of the Black Sea Fleet. The Soviet Navy organised a landing on the Black Sea coast behind the Romanian army. StG 77 spotted the Soviet fleet gunboat Krasnaya Armeniya, tugboat OP-8 and destroyer Frunze; flag ship of Admiral Lev Vladimirsky. On 21 September StG 77 hit and sank all three vessels.

The transports still delivered the Soviet 3rd Marine Rifle Regiment to Grigorevka, southwest of Odessa, and eliminated the threat of Romanian heavy coastal batteries against the port. The Soviet landing delayed the capture of Odessa. The following day the 69 IAP attacked the Ju 87s base and claimed 20 aircraft for one loss. Their claimed were excessive. The Ju 87s damaged the destroyers Bezposhchadnyy and Bezuprechnyy. The latter had to be taken under tow. The Staffel claimed another five naval vessels and four transports in the coming days, enabling the Romanians to contain the Soviet bridgehead. On 31 October, the destroyer Bodryy shelled German positions along the coastline. StG 77 Ju 87s attacked and wounded 50 of its crew by strafing her deck and superstructure with machinegun fire. Twelve days later, StG 77 sank the cruiser Chervona Ukraina.>

StG 77 fought in the early stages of the Battle of Moscow until 23 October 1941, but was withdrawn to the south, from Luftflotte 2 to 4, as the fall of Moscow was perceived to the imminent. Instead StG 77 supported the 11th Army pushing toward the Crimea. It was unable to complete with the VVS ChF Air Group despite support from KG 27 and JG 77, the Soviet air defences helped frustrate the German advance. On 24 October, after reinforcement with KG 51, the Crimean front collapsed and fell back to the port of Sevastopol, beginning a siege. The fighting bogged down. III./StG 77 lost 12 Ju 87s in a Soviet air attack on Spat airfield on 22 November.

StG 77 was instrumental in the First Battle of Kharkov, defeating Soviet counter-attacks from the Southwestern Front and allowing Army Group South to seize the city despite snowfall and a 500-ft ceiling. In November, after a skilful Soviet offensive had ejected German forces in the Battle of Rostov, from the city, StG 77 covered the German retreat to the Mius River. Reconnaissance discovered the build-up to another offensive on 7 December. StG 77 destroyed 70 trucks followed by more vehicles the next day, plus eight tanks and one artillery battery. On Boxing day 1941, the wing lost five Ju 87s near Stalino to ground-fire. All the crews returned, one from Soviet territory. Commander of I./StG 77, Helmut Bruck, landed twice on the steppe to pick up German airmen.

At the end of 1941, the invasion had failed to destroy the Soviet military. From 22 June to 22 November 1941, StG 77 claimed the destruction of 2,401 motor vehicles, 234 tanks, 92 artillery batteries, 21 trains, for 25 losses. II./StG 77's share was 140 tanks, 45 artillery pieces, 43 anti-aircraft guns in addition to 10 ships sunk.

=== Crimea and Second Kharkov ===
Over the winter of 1941/42, StG 77 remained in the south. Luftflotte 4 set up Sonderstab Krim (Special Staff Crimea) commanded by Robert Ritter von Greim. StG 77 was attached to this temporary command. The objective was to support the German 11th army in the conquest of the Crimea. KG 51 and KG 27 were also attached to the command which rushed to the Kerch peninsula, when, on 26 December 1941, the Soviet 44th Army landed at Feodosiya.

On 4 January 1942, the Black Sea Fleet put another battalion of marines ashore at Yevpatoria, on the west side of the Crimea. StG 77 eliminated the threat and the marines capitulated within a week. StG 77 combined with KG 27 and KG 51 to close the beachhead to Soviet reinforcements. On 5 January the ships Nogin and Zyryanin were sunk and two were damaged. Of note, after the capitulation of the Soviet battalion of marines at Yevpatoria, 1,300 of the local population were murdered, by German forces on 12 January; "1,300 partisans were executed" as the High Command diary put it.

On the first day of March third group claimed 13 tanks and three vehicles in anti-tank operations. III./StG 77 attacked the Parpach Line, near Kerch on 24 February 1942, targeting artillery positions. Five days later in 40 sorties and claimed 20 tanks damaged or destroyed. On 2 and 3 March it inflicted further damage to armour and transport. On the Donets front, II./StG 77 lost 6. Staffel commanding officer Hermann Ruppert, who had flown with success against the Black Sea Fleet, when he was killed by Soviet fighters. On 10 March, apparently with the assistance of Soviet civilians collaborating with the Wehrmacht, partisans destroyed three Ju 87s.

Soviet fighter forces were weak but the anti-aircraft fire of the Black Sea Fleet disrupted bombing accuracy. The Battle of the Kerch Peninsula lasted until May 1942. StG 77's notable success was III./StG 77s attack on the ChF VVS 36th Aviation Repair Shop in Kruglaya Bay near Sevastopol which killed the commander on chief of the VVS-ChF, Major General Nikolay Ostryakov and his deputy F.G. Korobkov on 25 April.

StG 77 played an important anti-tank role in the region at this time. Although the Ju 87 had not yet acquired the firepower to destroy the heavier Soviet tanks, unless a direct hit was scored, the Red Army used older types on this front and the Ju 87s proved effective. Dive bomber operations were carried out without much interference initially. Operation Bustard Hunt commenced on 8 May 1942, to crush the beachhead at Kerch. StG 77 pilots flew five sorties per day and dropped 200 tons of bombs. The target of the attacks was the 47th Army. On 9 May II./StG 77 lost two Ju 87s in action with the 45th Fighter Aviation Regiment as it bombed fortifications.

The Kerch battle had barely finished, when a crisis broke out further north. A Soviet offensive near Kharkov caught the Wehrmacht off-guard and StG 77 was rushed north to prevent a break-through; the entire wing was present within48 hours from 13 May. In the first two days, the Stukas of IV. Fliegerkorps, of which StG 77 was the only unit, claimed 54 tanks destroyed.

As German forces counter-attacked, StG 77 destroyed five of the main bridges across the Donets and damaged another four in a bid to prevent Soviet forces from retreating, while KG 3 inflicted heavy losses on road traffic. I./StG 77 attacked and destroyed Matilda II lend-lease tanks near Kharkov on 29 May. Commander Helmut Bruck was photographed examining one, marked with English instructions. IV. Fliegerkorps claimed the destruction of 596 aircraft in the air, 19 on the ground, 3,083 motor vehicles, 24 artillery batteries, 22 railway engines, six complete trains and 227 tanks for the loss of 49 aircraft. Hermann Plocher's study of the battle concluded the air corps was the critical factor in preventing a Soviet victory; the Ju 87s carried out the vital ground-support operations in the area.

After the defeat of the Kharkov offensive, all three groups were transferred back to VIII. Fliegerkorps. Now 600 aircraft strong, the fleet was committed against Sevastopol from 1 June. Oil, electricity, water pumps, harbour facilities, and submarine bases were attacked by StG 77 Ju 87s. Air Fleet Commander Von Richthofen watched the bombing from an observation post close to the front. The targets were badly damaged, and fires broke out all over the port city. The Luftwaffe flew 723 missions and dropped 525 tons of high explosive on the first day. Despite heavy anti-aircraft fire, just one Ju 87 was lost.

StG 77 supported XXX Army Corps in the south from 11 June; crews flew three to five sorties per day. A combined arms attack from eleven 420 mm mortars and dive-bombing by Ju 87s of StG 77 knocked out Fort Stalin's main armament (three of the four 76.2 mm guns) in the fortified city on 12 June. 27 Ju 87s of II./StG 77 attacked Maxim Gorky's main battery and a hit is believed to have knocked it out. They also claimed Coastal Battery no. 30 destroyed, though it ran out of ammunition and remained operational according to Soviet records. Other sources maintain, StG 77s 17 June mission put it out of action.

The nature of the fighting was described in one account:

On 21 June I./StG 77 flew three missions against anti-tank batteries and two days later they caught and destroyed a whole horse transport column accompanied by a few tanks in ravines at Inkerman. Unable to winkle out Russian defenders in the natural caves and caverns of this region, StG 77 sealed them in, blocking exit tunnels to one such system at map reference GB9 with some precision bombing. Another horse transport column along with tanks and troops was decimated in ravine N2C.

StG 77 flew against the Black Sea Fleet which brought in supplies and evacuated the Soviet wounded. On 26 June 1942, II./StG 77 sank the destroyer Bezuprechnyy, with 320 soldiers on board. The destroyer sank within two minutes. The destroyer Tashkent, commanded by Vasiliy Yeroshenko, evaded numerous attacks by the Ju 87s. After four hours of chasing, and 335 bombs dropped, the Soviet ship escaped StG 77. The ship was severely damaged by a near miss, but brought 2,100 wounded Soviet soldiers to Novorossiysk. The episode convinced the Soviet command to stop sending large ships to the port.

On 1 July, fearing Sevastopol would be evacuated at the last minute the Luftwaffe sent 78 bombers—from I./KG 76, 1./KG 100, and 40 Ju 87s from StG 77 against the ports of Novorossiysk, Taman, and Tuapse. For the loss of only one bomber, the Tashkent, and the transports Ukrania, Proletariy and Elbrus were sunk. The salvage vessel Chernomor, the schooner Dnestr, two torpedo boats and a patrol boat. In addition the destroyers Soobrazitelny and Nezamozhnik, patrol vessels Shkval and Shtorm, one gunboat, one torpedo boat, two transports, and a floating dock sustained various degrees of damage. The city was eventually captured on 12 July. From 2 June to 3 July 1942, StG 77 had flown 7,078 combat sorties and dropped 3,537 tons of bombs. The German air fleet had lost just 23 aircraft.

=== Stalingrad, Kursk and disbandment ===
StG 77 was at the forefront of the German summer offensive in 1942, Operation Blue. The goal was to capture the oil-rich Caucasus. The wing assisted the First Panzer Army in the capture of Voroshilovgrad, Rovenki and recapture of Rostov. I./StG 77 inflicted heavy damage to Soviet infantry, tanks and vehicles. By this time it had recorded its 30,000th mission. The Stukas of IV. Fliegerkorps paved the way for the 13th Panzer Division and 5th SS Panzer Division Wiking, as they pushed through heavy anti-tank defences near Rostov. On 24 July, I./StG 77 rendered invaluable support to the 57th Panzer Corps, allowed the Germans to seize the bridges leading into the city.

Once captured, the route to the Caucasus was open, and IV. Fliegerkorps was ordered to support Wilhelm List in his drive to the oil fields. Only a small band of Ju 87s, E./StG 77, remained on the Black Sea coast with Fliegerführer Süd (Flying Leader South). The group supported attacks on road and shipping traffic on the northern Caucasus. A report from the OKW on 29 July stated that the Stukas carried out bombing operations without fighter escort because of Soviet aerial weaknesses.

I./StG 77 supported the attacks on Stalingrad on 23 August 1942. By 26 September, it was withdrawn Staffel at a time, to Breslau to rest and re-equip. It returned as was prominent in supporting the Axis forces at the Battle of Stalingrad. In addition to close air support, it attacked small vessels reinforcing Soviet forces in the city on the Volga River. Boats, ferry and barges were strafed and bombed virtually every day, from first light to dusk. By 20 September it had 20 operational Ju 87s from 35. II./StG 77 fought in the Battle of Voronezh and the advance down the Don River. It flew operations in the Stalingrad area, then moved south-east of Krasnodar on 3 October to support the First Panzer Army and 17th Army to consolidate German gains in the northern Caucasus against growing opposition. III./StG 77 was moved north after the initial phase of the summer offensive. It was to support the capture of Leningrad and was based to Lake Ilmen, Vyazma and Vitebsk at times. In September it was attached to Stab./StG 1. In the event, the Leningrad attack was never carried out.

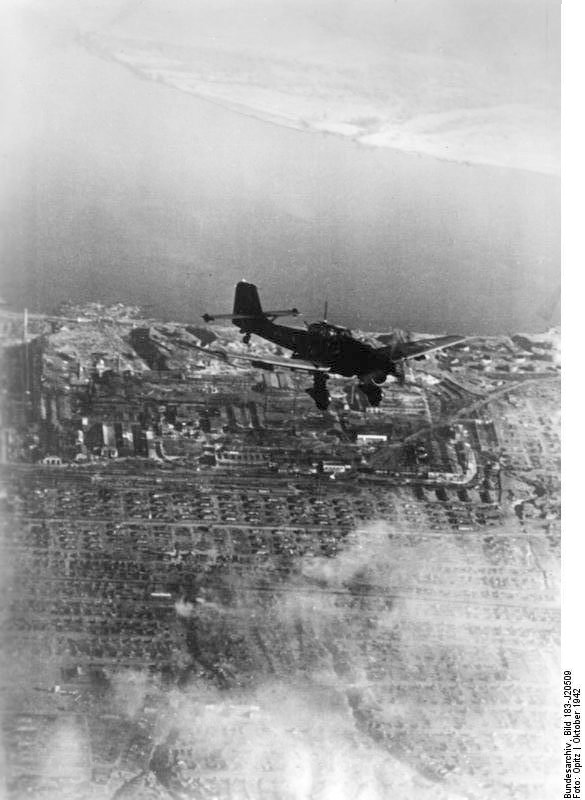
Junkers Ju 87 B during the Battle of Stalingrad

On 13 September StG 77 participated in a large offensive to destroy Soviet forces in the city. With StG 2 and SG 1, by attacking banks and bridges around the city. By mid-October 1942, StG 1, 2, and 77 had largely silenced Soviet artillery on the eastern bank of the Volga before turning their attention to the shipping that was trying to reinforce the narrowing Soviet pockets of resistance. The Soviet 62nd Army had been cut in two and, due to intensive air attack on its supply ferries, was receiving much less material support. On 14 October, I./StG 77, with II./StG 1 and I., and II./StG 2, flew 53 major operations and made 320 individual sorties. Two days prior, StG 77 lost commanding officer Alfons Orthofer killed during an air raid on the base as he was waiting for orders to take off. He died in a Maykop hospital.

StG 77 failed to prevent the success of Operation Uranus, the Soviet counter-offensive. StG 77 supported a failed relief effort (Operation Winter Storm). It did partake in intensive air attacks which broke up the front of the 51st Army initially. The attack failed and the wing experiences heavy attrition. For example, 8./StG 77 lost six machines between 16 and 19 December 1942. By 20 December III./StG 77 had only seven serviceable dive-bombers. The wing still achieved some success covering the retreat from the Caucasus after the Soviet Operation Little Saturn. Over 29–30 December 4./StG 77 accounted for 51 Soviet tanks at Zimovniki. On 2 January 1943, the same unit lost two Ju 87s to the 236 IAP. Symbolic of StG 77s defeat in the Caucasus was the capture of its bomb storage at Belorechenskaya on 28 January 1943.

On 19 February 1943, in the midst of the Third Battle of Kharkov, which Stab., I. and II./StG 77 participated, Commander Walter Enneccerus was relieved of command for failing to carry out attacks he believed were suicidal. Helmet Bruck replaced him. III./StG 77 lost 29 ground crew on the retreat from Rossosh to Kharkov. It probably took part in the air battles but was decimated and withdrawn to Würzburg. It was rebuilt with 37 Ju 87s and 245 officers and sent to Luftflotte 2, II. Fliegerkorps. The group moved to Cagliari, but was not to be used until the Allied invasion of Sicily (Operation Husky). In the event, the airfields were so badly damaged on the island it was ordered to return to IV. Fliegerkorps on 27 April 1943.

In the summer, 1943, StG 77 was assigned to support the II SS Panzer Corps, on the southern sector on the frontline around Kursk. All the groups were placed under VIII. Fliegerkorps. When the Battle of Kursk began on 5 July, the wing supported the Fourth Panzer Army. It immediately began to suffer casualties. A formation over the front was caught by the 88 IAP, equipped with 17 Lavochkin La-5s on 6 July. The 17 Soviet fighters destroyed ro severely damaged 10 Ju 87s. The air corps lost 11 destroyed and 11 damaged on this date; StG 77 accounting for fifty percent of the losses.

On 8 July, StG 77 supported the Großdeutschland against the fortified village of Syrtsevo. StG 77 lost five Ju 87s and another damaged in combat with the 240 IAP. The air corps claimed, with contributions from SG 1, 84 Soviet tanks destroyed, 21 damaged, 40 vehicles destroyed, and five artillery pieces along with two anti-aircraft guns and two rocket launchers. By the evening of 8 July, 16 dive-bombers had been lost. The Germans halved the amount of Stuka sorties over the ensuing days.

On 11 July, 9./StG 77, under III./StG 77 lost another five Ju 87s as it supported attacks against the 69th Army. The 183 IAP were their attackers. In the afternoon, 50 Ju 87s supported the 1st SS Panzer Division Leibstandarte SS Adolf Hitler's attack on Hill 252.2. On 12 July StG 77 was involved in the Battle of Prokhorovka. While the Ju 87s could only fly 150 sorties in support, but with StG 2 the attacked with great success against Soviet armour advancing in the open. The 31st Tank Brigade, of the 29th Tank Corps, suffered heavy casualties. The 36th Tank Brigade's commander was wounded by aircraft when his tank was destroyed. On 14 July, another six Ju 87s were lost supporting the XXXXVIII Panzer Corps.

The German offensive continued in the southern sector, but Operation Roland failed and the Red Army took time to begin the counter offensive, Operation Polkovodets Rumyantsev. Soviet forces slowly pressed the Germans back. On 19 July 7./StG 77 was wiped out by a Soviet attack on the base at Kramatorskaya and 4./StG 77 lost another three to Soviet fighters. At the beginning of August 1943, the Soviet summer counter offensives began. StG 77 lost 24 dive-bombers and 30 damaged between 5 and 31 July 1943. Their losses from July to December 1942 were just 23. The Stuka arm had also lost eight Knight's Cross of the Iron Cross holders—Karl Fitzner of 5./StG 77 was one of them; he was shot down and killed on 8 July.

III./StG 77 operated in the Kharkov and Belgorod sectors, after the fall of the latter on 5 August. From 6 to 12 August it lost four Ju 87s in combat and another three in the retreat to prevent their capture. On 17 August it was at Poltava, and the following day 7./StG 77 lost another four in combat near Sumy; four men were killed and two wounded. The group retreated to Stalino and lost another three on 2 and 3 September while 8. and 9. Staffel lost two Ju 87s near Kharkov on 5 September. Details for II./StG 77 are less clear. By mid-October it was engaged in the Battle of the Dnieper, attacking Soviet spearheads east of Kiev. First group also mirrored these operations. It was last in action against bridges over the Dnieper to prevent the Soviet forces crossing.

II. Gruppe was redesignated as III. Gruppe, Schlachtgeschwader 10 on 18 October 1943, the remaining groups renamed to Schlachtgeschwader 77 the same day.

== Commanding officers ==
=== Kommodore ===
- Oberst Günter Schwartzkopff, 1 May 1939 – 14 May 1940 (KIA)
- Major Clemens Graf von Schönborn-Wiesentheid, 15 May 1940 – 20 July 1942
- Major Alfons Orthofer, 25 July 1942 – 12 October 1942 (KIA)
- Major Walter Enneccerus, 13 October 1942 – 20 February 1943
- Major Helmut Bruck, 20 February 1943 – 18 October 1943

=== Gruppenkommandeure ===
==== I./StG 77 ====
- Hauptmann Friedrich-Karl Freiherr von Dalwigk zu Lichtenfels, 1 May 1939 – 13 July 1940
- Hauptmann Meisel, 14 July 1940 – 18 August 1940
- Hauptmann Helmut Bruck, 28 August 1940 – 19 February 1943
- Major Werner Roell, 20 February 1943 – 18 October 1943

==== II./StG 77 ====
- Hauptmann Clemens Graf von Schönborn-Wiesentheid, 1 May 1939 – 15 May 1940
- Hauptmann Waldemar Plewig, 15 May 1940 – 8 August 1940
- Hauptmann Alfons Orthofer, 15 August 1940 – 27 June 1942
- Major Kurt Huhn, 1 July 1942 – 1 April 1943
- Hauptmann Helmut Leicht, 1 April 1943 – 18 October 1943

==== III./StG 77 ====
- Hauptmann Helmuth Bode, 9 July 1940 – 25 August 1942
- Hauptmann Georg Jakob, 26 August 1942 – 1 December 1942
- Hauptmann Franz Kieslich, 1 January 1943 – 18 October 1943

== See also ==
Organization of the Luftwaffe during World War II
