= Belleville-et-Châtillon-sur-Bar =

- Commune
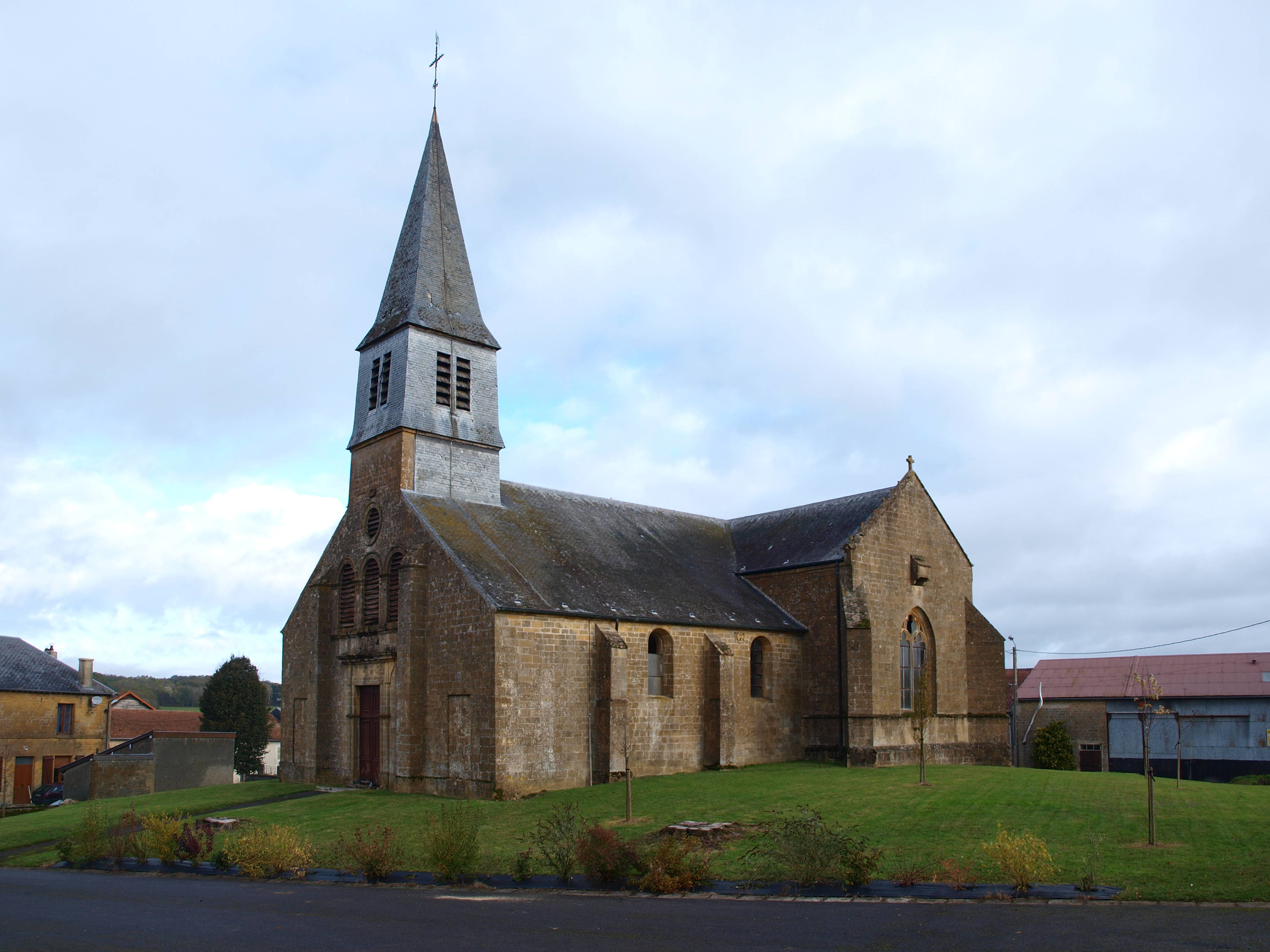
- The church in Belleville-et-Châtillon-sur-Bar

- Coat of arms
- Location of Belleville-et-Châtillon-sur-Bar
- Location within France Location within Grand Est
- Coordinates: 49°26′49″N 4°49′45″E
- Country: France
- Region: Grand Est
- Department: Ardennes
- Arrondissement: Vouziers
- Canton: Vouziers
- Intercommunality: Argonne Ardennaise

Government
  - Mayor (2020–2026): Claude Debources
- Area^{1}: 21.21 km^{2} (8.19 sq mi)
- Elevation: 236 m (774 ft)
- Highest elevation: 243 m (797 ft)
- Lowest elevation: 162 m (531 ft)
- Population (2023): 240
  - Density: 11/km^{2} (29/sq mi)
- Time zone: UTC+01:00 (CET)
  - Summer (DST): UTC+02:00 (CEST)
- INSEE/Postal code: 08057 /08240
- ^{1} French Land Register data, which excludes lakes, ponds, glaciers > 1 km^{2} (0.386 sq mi or 247 acres) and river estuaries.

Belleville-et-Châtillon-sur-Bar (French pronunciation: [bɛlvil e ʃatijɔ̃ syʁ baʁ], lit. 'Belleville and Châtillon on Bar') is a commune in the Ardennes department in northern France.

== Population ==
Historical population
Year	Pop.	±% p.a.
1968	328	—
1975	389	+2.47%
1982	325	−2.54%
1990	340	+0.57%
1999	327	−0.43%
2007	307	−0.79%
2012	307	+0.00%
2017	272	−2.39%
2023	240	−2.06%
Source: INSEE

== See also ==
- Communes of the Ardennes department
