= Grzegorz Bębnik =

Polish historian and author

Grzegorz Bębnik (born 1970) is a Polish historian and an employee of the Institute of National Remembrance.

== Reception and honors ==
Jan Grabowski classified Ostatnia walka Afrykanerów (2004) as a fascist work that commended the "struggles" of the "white minority" in South Africa. In 2018, Bębnik was awarded the Upper Silesian Tacitus Award.

== Selected publications ==
- Bębnik, Grzegorz (2004). Ostatnia walka Afrykanerów (Wyd. 1 ed.). Biała Podlaska: Oficyna Wydawnicza "Rekonkwista". ISBN 83-918593-1-2. OCLC 54754607.
- Katowice we wrześniu '39. Katowice: Instytut Pamięci Narodowej, Komisja Ścigania Zbrodni przeciwko Narodowi Polskiemu. 2006. ISBN 83-60464-13-8. OCLC 700942988.
- Koniec pokoju, początek wojny. Niemieckie działania dywersyjne w kampanii polskiej 1939 r. Wybrane aspekty. 2014.
