= Clemens Graf von Schönborn-Wiesentheid =

German Air Force officer (1905–1944)

- Born: 3 April 1905; Munich, Germany
- Died: 30 August 1944 (aged 39); Sofia, Bulgaria
- Burial place: German war cemetery section of the Central Sofia Cemetery
- Military career
- Allegiance: Nazi Germany
- Branch: Luftwaffe
- Rank: Oberst (colonel)
- Commands: 4./JG 132, StG 77; Fliegerführer Arad
- Conflicts: World War II
- Awards: Knight's Cross of the Iron Cross

Clemens Graf von Schönborn-Wiesentheid (3 April 1905 – 30 August 1944) was a German Air Force officer who commanded Air Command Arad and Sturzkampfgeschwader 77 (StG 77—77th Dive Bomber Wing) during the Axis-led invasion of Yugoslavia during World War II. He was killed in a flying accident at Sofia, Bulgaria on 30 August 1944. He was planning to attend a General Staff meeting when his aircraft crashed for unknown reasons.

== Career ==
In 1934, Schönborn-Wiesentheid volunteered for service in the Heer (German Army) and transferred to the Luftwaffe a year later. In March 1936, Schönborn-Wiesentheid was appointed Staffelkapitän (squadron leader) of 4. Staffel (4th squadron) of Jagdgeschwader 132 "Richthofen" (JG 132—132nd Fighter Wing), succeeding Major Theo Osterkamp who was transferred. On 28 August 1937, he transferred command of 4. Staffel to Oberleutnant Günther Reinecke. Schönborn-Wiesentheid was then appointed Gruppenkommandeur (group commander) of II. Gruppe of Sturzkampfgeschwader 165 (StG 165—165th Dive Bomber Wing).

On 16 April 1940, Schönborn-Wiesentheid succeeded Hauptmann Ernst Ott as Gruppenkommandeur of III. Gruppe of Sturzkampfgeschwader 2 (StG 2—2nd Dive Bomber Wing). He held this position until 20 June 1942 when he transferred command of the Gruppe to Hauptmann Heinrich Brücker. Schönborn-Wiesentheid was killed in a flying accident when his Fieseler Fi 156 Storch liaison aircraft crashed east of Sofia, Bulgaria on 30 August 1944. He was buried in the German war cemetery section of the Central Sofia Cemetery.

== Awards ==
- Knight's Cross of the Iron Cross on 21 July 1940 as Major and Geschwaderkommodore of Sturzkampfgeschwader 77

Military offices
Preceded by Oberst Günter Schwartzkopff	Geschwaderkommodore of Sturzkampfgeschwader 77; 15 May 1940 – 20 July 1942	Succeeded by Major Alfons Orthofer
