= Sturzkampfgeschwader 1 =

Luftwaffe dive bomber wing during World War II

- I./StG 1's emblem
- Active: 1 May 1939 – 18 October 1943
- Country: Nazi Germany
- Branch: Luftwaffe
- Type: Dive bomber
- Role: Close air support Offensive counter air Anti-tank warfare Air interdiction Maritime interdiction Bandenbekämpfung (anti-partisan)
- Size: Air Force Wing
- Engagements: World War II

Commanders
- Notable commanders: Helmut Mahlke (commanded one group)

Insignia
- Identification symbol: A5

Sturzkampfgeschwader 1 (StG 1 - Dive Bomber Wing 1) was a Luftwaffe dive bomber wing during World War II.

StG 1 was formed in May 1939 and remained active until October 1943, when it was renamed and reorganised into Schlachtgeschwader 1 (SG 1). It operated the Junkers Ju 87 Stuka dive-bomber exclusively in the combat role.

StG 1 served the German war effort on every front including limited Bandenbekämpfung operations in support of Wehrmacht and Nazi paramilitary forces.

== Formation ==
StG 1 was formed at the close of the 1930s as the Luftwaffe rushed to form and reorganise its combat units. I./StG 1 was formed first, not the stab ('command') staffel ('squadron'), on 1 May 1939 in Insterburg, East Prussia. Major Werner Rentsch was appointed as the group's first commanding officer. The group was created by renaming I./StG 160. It remained there with all 38 Ju 87s serviceable, and two of its three Dornier Do 17Ps operational for reconnaissance.

Stab./StG 1 was formed on 18 November 1939 at Jüterbog, and the wing had its first Geschwaderkommodore, Oberst Eberhard Baier. It was equipped with three Ju 87s and six Do 17s by 10 May 1940. The unit was placed under the command of VIII. Fliegerkorps. All but one of the aircraft was combat ready. II./StG 1 was formed on 9 July 1940 in France, possibly at Saint-Inglevert Airfield, around Marquise, northeast of Boulogne. Hauptmann Anton Keil was appointed commander.

III./StG 1 also did not exist until 9 July 1940 when it was formed at Falaise. Hauptmann Helmut Mahlke became the first commanding officer. The group was formed by renaming Trägersturzkampfgruppe I./Tr.G. 186. The strength of the second and third groups at the commencement of combat operations is unknown.

== War service ==
I./StG 1 was assigned Luftwaffenkommando Ostpreußen (Air Force Command East Prussia), under the Lw-Lehrdivision (Air Force Learning Division), and later under the command of Fliegerführer z.b.V (Flying Leader z.b.V). The group was then the only existing combat unit of the wing, and fought as an independent group, and was not subordinated to another dive-bomber wing.

=== Poland and "Phoney War" ===
On 1 September 1939 the German Wehrmacht began the invasion of Poland with the cooperation from the Soviet Union and Red Army, which began World War II. 1. and 3./StG 1 opened the attack on Poland, carrying out possibly the first air raid of the war. Bruno Dilley's squadron was ordered to destroy the bridge at Tczew, near Danzig.

Personnel of the wing had travelled across the bridge via the former Prussian Eastern Railway and learned that the detonation cables for the demolition charges ran along the slope of the railway embankment between the station and the bridge. At 04:45, Dilly and his unit attacked at low-level, hitting the bunkers and array of cables. The mission was a partial success, but turned to failure when Polish Army engineers repaired the cables and blew the bridge before German forces arrived. The cause for the failure has been blamed on the German Army failing to follow up the attack with a speedy advance.

Later that day, StG 1 truck at radio stations in Babice and Lacy, near Warsaw. The group also attacked airfields in the Kraków area. The group lost three Ju 87s on this first day; one crew was killed flying into the ground on the return flight from Dilley's mission. On 3 September the group supported the 3rd Army's advance to Mława. Accurate bombing to within five metres of the bunkers stunned the Modlin Army defenders allowing the Germans to overrun their defences. The group took part in the Battle of Radom, in which six Polish divisions were destroyed from 8 to 13 September. It also reduced the Iłża pocket. The Prusy Army was severely damaged by air attacks by I./StG 1, StG 2, I./StG 77 and III./StG 151. ./LG 2, I., II./KG 55 and I./KG 77 supported.

The group passed through field strips, as far south as Górowo and Orońsko. It ended the campaign at the latter location on 29 September 1939, a week before the Polish surrender. I./StG 1 moved to Cologne and stayed there until March 1940. At Delmenhorst the group became the first to receive the Ju 87R, which had long-range tanks fitted for Maritime interdiction operations.

=== Scandinavia ===
In February and March 1940 the Wehrmacht began preparations to invade Denmark and Norway, christened Operation Weserübung. X. Fliegerkorps was the only German combat air formation committed. I./StG 1 was placed under the air corps' command and based at Kiel-Holtenau. The group possessed 39 Ju 87s. The force was a mixture of Ju 87Bs and Rs.

The group participated in the Norwegian Campaign from 9 April. The long-range Ju 87s appear not to have needed staging grounds for operations against Norwegian targets and probably did not play a role in the invasion of Denmark earlier in the day. The first attacks were directed and coastal fortresses to prevent them from interfering with the seaborne landing. The group attacked Akershus Fortress. In the late morning, the group attacked Oscarsborg Fortress after the Norwegian coastal fortress had sunk the heavy cruiser Blücher. The group moved to Arhus, Denmark and then to Stavanger. 1 staffel moved to Oslo Fornebu. Naval interdiction and was a priority and the main target was the Royal Navy's Home Fleet. The same day, the unit hit the 600 ton torpedo boat Æger in the engine room. It was run aground and scuttled. The sinking did not save the German freighter Roda, which was carrying anti-aircraft guns to Stavanger. The Norwegian destroyer sank her before her own demise. III./KG 4 have also been credited with the attack that sank her: the group was operating in the same area.

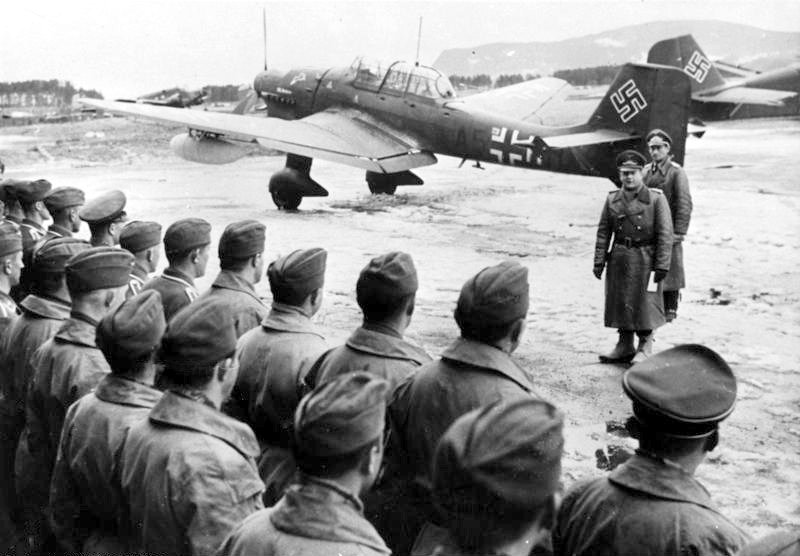
Erhard Milch addresses airmen of StG 1 in Norway. A Ju 87R is in the background

The group attempted to repel Royal Navy forces interdicting German supply lines. On 17 April seven aircraft bombed HMS Suffolk (55), hitting a turret. Only three days earlier Suffolk sank the German tanker Skagerrak northwest of Bodø. On 19 April three Ju 87s attacked British warships in Namsos. It was their first action in the Namsos Campaign. 1./StG 1 was ordered, by Martin Harlinghausen, to operate from frozen lakes for want of appropriate landing grounds.

On 20 April the wing suffered their first loss. While attacking the anti-aircraft cruiser HMS Cairo, Leutnant Karl Pfeil and his gunner Gerhard Winkels were shot down and captured near Namsos by anti-aircraft fire; no hits were scored. On 25 April, a British raid by Fleet Air Arm Blackburn Skua and Fairey Swordfish aircraft destroyed six or seven Ju 87s near Trondheim/Værnes. Carriers HMS Ark Royal and HMS Glorious escaped retaliation attacks. Five other aircraft were damaged and Major Paul-Werner Hozzel's 1. Staffel was effected. Erhard Milch used 800 civilian forced labourers to repair the extensively damaged airfield.

On 28 April attacks against ships in Ålesund and Åndalsnes were carried out and a small ship was sunk. Ju 87s did manage to sink anti-submarine trawlers Siretoko, Jardine and Warwickshire. HMS Bittern was badly damaged by Oberleutnant Elmo Schäfer and sunk by HMS Juno. Later, on 1 May 1940, they failed to hit Ark Royal during an interdiction against British naval forces. Staffelkapitän of 2. Staffel, Oberleutnant Heinz Böhme claimed to have hit the carrier (he did not, it was a near-miss) and failed to mention in his report that he lost one of his Ju 87s (Oberfeldwebel Erich Stahl and Unteroffizier Friedrich Gott) to two Sea Gladiators of 802 Squadron FAA. This was the only loss on 1 May.

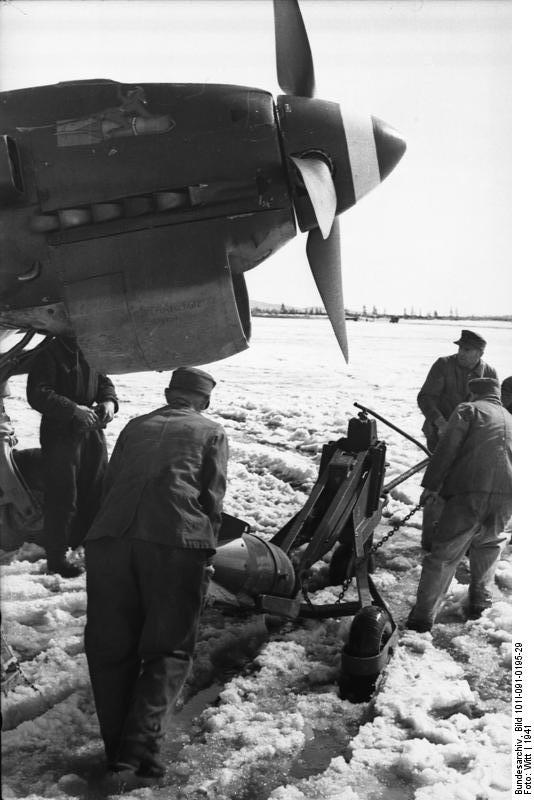
A Ju 87 rearmed. Waterlogged airfields posed practical problems for mechanics

The next few missions on the afternoon of 1 May and 3 May, the Ju 87s had more success As allied forced contemplated withdrawal. The French large destroyer Bison was sunk along with HMS Afridi by I./StG 1 on 3 May 1940 during the evacuation from Namsos. Bison's forward magazine were hit killing 108 of the crew. Afridi, who had attempted to rescue Bison's survivors was sunk with the loss of 63 sailors. Three other ships were damaged by the group in attacks on convoys off the coast. The trawlers were later scuttled; St Goran (565 gross register tons (GRT)), HMS Aston Villa of the 15th Antisubmarine Striking Force, (546 GRT), Gaul (550 GRT).

On 4 May the group sank the Norwegian steamers Blaafjeld, Sekstant, Pan and Aafjord. StG 1 flew 100 missions against shipping. It attempted to sink the British aircraft carriers but none of the attacks were a success. On 8 May Paul-Werner Hozzel, Oberleutnant Elmar Schaefer and Leutnant Martin Möbus and veteran observer Unteroffizier Gerhard Grenzel, became the first Stuka crews to receive the Knight's Cross of the Iron Cross. Grenzel was the first non-commissioned officer in the Luftwaffe to receive the award. Allied officer commanding, Major General Adrian Carton de Wiart recommended ceasing supply operations in the face of German air superiority. Maritime interdiction was the Luftwaffe's most effective contribution.

On 22 May the group raided Bodø harbour, and sank the Norwegian trawler Ingrid. The group probably sank the freighter Skerstad at Rognan. Two days later, an armed trawler was sunk at Bodø. On 27 May the town was bombed in an effort to destroy the radio station but numerous houses were also destroyed. The Gruppe suffered one loss; Feldwebel Kurt Zube, to a No. 263 Squadron RAF Gloster Gladiator flown by Flight Commander Caesar Hull. Zube was rescued by German forces. By this date StG 1 maintained 39 Ju 87s with 27 operational.

The group took part in the Battles of Narvik. Heinz Böhme, commanding 2. Staffel, and his war correspondent gunner were killed on 2 June 1940 over Narvik. The German crew purportedly fired on Allied soldiers from the wreck. Böhme was the victim of Sergeant H H Kitchener and Flight Lieutenant A T Williams of No. 263 Squadron RAF. Two more Ju 87s were shot down on the morning of the 2 June. Leutnant Klaus Kuber and his gunner were killed, the victim of a No. 43 Squadron RAF Hawker Hurricane flown by Sergeant B L Taylor whilst Feldwebel Hans Ott and his gunner Sonderführer Brack fell victim to Flying Officer John F Drummond. The campaign ended with the Withdrawal of Allied forces on 10 June.

=== Belgium and France ===
Only Stab./StG 1 took part in Fall Gelb, the attack on Western Europe. Three Ju 87s and six Do 17s (five operational) were placed under the command of II. Fliegerkorps, attached to Luftflotte 3. To bolster strength, II./StG 2 and I.(St)/TrG 186, a specialised anti-shipping unit was placed under Eberhard Baier's command.

The Stab unit did take part of in the attack on Fort Eben-Emael; which led to the crucial victory at the Battle of Fort Eben-Emael and probably continued to support German forces in the Battle of Belgium and Battle of France. With KG 76 and KG 77, the StG 1 elements supported the break out of the XV Panzer Corps across the Meuse between Houx and Dinant. The StG 1 contingent was present in the Amiens sector on 25 May assisting KG 77 repulse French armoured counter-attacks.

On 9 June it did take part in air attacks against Pont-Sainte-Maxence. Specific operations of these small contingent are unknown. I./StG 1 arrived in France at Evreux on around the third week of June. The group attacked fortified positions around the Cherbourg Peninsula. The fighting ended with the Armistice of 22 June 1940.

=== Britain and Channel Front ===
In July 1940 all units were relocated to based at Angers, France, under the operational command of General der Flieger Wolfram von Richthofen., commanding VIII. Fliegerkorps. StG 1 prepared for Unternehmen Adlerangriff (Operation Eagle Attack) which began the Battle of Britain. StG 1 formed part of Hugo Sperrle's Luftflotte 3. The total strength of the Geschwader was 80 Ju 87s with 55 operational. First group began using airfields around Caen while third group used Théville for its base of operations.

On 7 July, III./StG 1 formed officially two days later according to records, flew their first combat mission over the English Channel in the Kanalkampf phase of the air battle. Their assignment was to destroy shipping (maritime interdiction) but the pilots found no ships. On 13 July II./StG 1 flew shipping operations escorted by JG 51. Convoy CW 5 became the target. 11 Hawker Hurricanes from 56 Squadron engaged before the Bf 109s could react and the group suffered two damaged Ju 87s. The Ju 87s had some success; HMS Vanessa was disabled by near-misses and was taken under tow by tug Lady Duncannonand and repaired in November.

On 19 July elements of the wing attacked the destroyer HMS Beagle off Dover. Beagle replied with its anti-aircraft guns and high-speed manoeuvres, to escape the deluge of bombs from 40 to 50 Ju 87s. Several near misses damaged Beagle's gyro and engines but there were no casualties and the ship made it back to Dover. Later in the day, nine Do 17s from KG 2 and Ju 87s from StG 1 bombed Dover harbour, attacking in shallow dives. Twenty-two bombs were dropped. The oiler War Sepoy blew up, the tug Simla, the drifter Golden Drift and the destroyer HMS Griffin were all damaged.

Wartime film of Ju 87s attacking a British convoy in the Channel. It was probably filmed for propaganda

On 20 July, II./StG 1 attacked Convoy Bosom. The Bf 109 escorts were unable to prevent the RAF intercepting, which damaged four Ju 87s and accounted for two destroyed; Leutnant Roden and his gunner being killed. The wing also lost its Do 17 reconnaissance machine shot down near the convoy. While the fighters were dog-fighting, the Ju 87s attacked the convoy and the coaster Pulborough blew up. The destroyer HMS Brazen, which was hit several times, snapped in half, then sank.

On 24 July StG 1 sank the freighter Terlings and the Norwegian steamer Kollskegg. The next day, CW 8 was discovered and attacked by 11.(Stuka)/LG 1 and III./StG 1, off Folkestone. Five ships were sunk and four damaged, including the destroyers HMS Boreas and HMS Brilliant. The Kriegsmarine sent nine E-Boats against the convoy and hit three with gunfire. Some of the Ju 87s were damaged by naval gunfire. II./StG 1 accounted for the cement carrier Summity and collier Henry Moon.

On 26 July, elements of StG 1 attacked Convoy Bacon off the Isle of Portland, but lost one Ju 87 and a reconnaissance Do 17. On 29 July a formation consisted of 48 Ju 87s from six Staffeln of IV.(Stuka)/LG 1, II./StG 1 and II./StG 3 attacked Dover harbour. StG 1 and LG 1 lost two Stukas each and II./StG 3 reported one damaged. The steamer SS Gronland was sunk in the outer harbour, having already been damaged in the attacks of 25 July; 19 crew were killed. The patrol yacht Gulzar was sunk but the crew were saved and the coastal ship Sandhurst was destroyed.

The last major convoy action took place on 8 August 1940 against Convoy CW 9 (Peewit), comprising 20 merchant ships and nine naval vessels. II. and III./StG 1 to attack the convoy. Commanded by Major Paul-Werner Hozzel and Hauptmann Helmut Mahlke the attacks sank the Dutch vessel SS Ajax carrying a cargo of Wheat in five minutes, killing four men and wounding four. SS Coquetdale was also sunk with two men wounded. III./StG 1 lost two Ju 87s, II./StG 1 suffered one damaged. In the afternoon 82 Ju 87s from III./StG 1, I./StG 3 and Stab, II./StG 77 attacked convoy CW 9. Anti-submarine yachts HMS Wilna, HMS Rion, trawlers HMS Cape Palliser, Kingston Chrysoberyl, Kingston Olivine and Stella Capella were attacked, having been sent to rescue survivors from previous attacks. Cape Palliser and Rion were badly damaged; none were sunk and the Ju 87s appear to have suffered no loss.

On 11 August a Staffel of Ju 87s from II./StG 1 and IV./LG 1 arrived over the Thames Estuary to attack convoy Agent and Arena. The formation was protected by Bf 109s belonging to JG 26 and led by Adolf Galland. One StG 1 Ju 87 also fell to RAF fighters before the Bf 109s arrived. The raid sank two naval trawlers—Tamarisk and Pyrope killing 12 seamen.

On 13 August the Luftwaffe began Operation Eagle Attack to destroy RAF Fighter Command in southern England. 52 Ju 87s from StG 1 and StG 2 were ordered to attack RAF Warmwell and Yeovil. StG 1 and StG 2 gave up on their original targets owing to low-clouds and bombed Portland instead. II./StG 1 was sent to bomb airfields near Rochester. The group failed to find the target and returned without suffering interception.

II./StG 1 commanded by Anton Keil partnered IV./LG 1 in an attack on coastal targets on 14 August. Heavily escorted, Fighter Command responded with large fighter forces. Over 200 aircraft joined the air battle over Dover and the Ju 87s sank the Goodwin lightship. LG 1 lost five aircraft StG 1 escaped without loss.

On 15 August IV(St)./LG 1 and Hauptmann Keil commanding II./StG 1, were ordered by the operations staff at II. Fliegerkorps to attack RAF Hawkinge and RAF Lympne. The latter was attacked by 26 Ju 87s from II./StG 1 while German fighters provided effective escort. The attack caused enough damage for the airfield to be out action for two days; but few aircraft were present on the field at the time. I./StG 1 attacked RAF Warmwell while Yeovil was bombed by II./StG 2. The Ju 87s were covered by 60 Bf 109s from JG 53 and JG 27. Another 40 Bf 110s from ZG 76 and LG 1 flew as support. The wing lost only one Stuka from first group, shot down over Hawkinge.

StG 1's next major operation was on the 16 August. Stab. and III./StG 1 attacked and knocked out the radar station at Ventnor, which remained inoperative for an entire week, before also proceeding to destroy three hangars and half a dozen aircraft at RNAS Lee-on-Solent. Meanwhile, StG 2 carried out an effective attack on RAF Tangmere. StG 1 escaped without loss once more, but StG 2 lost nine with three damaged.

The Ju 87 groups were mauled in the large air battles of the 18 August and saw no further action in the battle for air superiority. StG 77 lost 17 of its crews on that day. In the two weeks preceding, the Stuka units had flown 14 major operations and lost 39 aircraft from 281. For the remainder of August 1940 the only other incident of note occurred on 28 August when two third group aircraft collided at Deauville airfield killing all four men.

They remained active, against shipping in the English Channel, and also played a minor role in The Blitz, flying some night sorties against London. At the beginning of November 1940, a forward command post was set up at Ostend, Belgium for StG 1's anti-shipping operations. A handful of specially picked crews from I. and II./StG 1 carried out small-scale attacks against coastal targets until mid-February 1941.

On 1 November 1940, the group sank Torbay II (83 GRT) of the east coast of Kent, and attached convoy FS 322 in the Thames Estuary sinking Tillburyness (279 GRT) killing ten, steamer Letchworth (1,317 GRT) from convoy FS 322, killing one man During the attack on convoy FS 322 the group also sank the nearby East Oaze lightship with the loss of all six of its crew. The sloop HMS Pintail was badly damaged escorting FS 323. Over the 29–30 November it lost Bf 110 reconnaissance aircraft to RAF interceptors off Ramsgate. First group was moved to Bergen op Zoom to attack shipping in the Thames and South East England. Saint-Pol-sur-Ternoise and Brias hosted second group, from 26 October. The last operation of note came on the 11/12 February 1941, when an aircraft was shot down attacking a convoy in an unusual night-attack. Third group lost an aircraft from 9 Staffel on an identical sortie two nights later.

=== Siege of Malta ===
From 26 December 1940 to 10 January 1941, I./StG 1 was transferred to Trapani and was subordinated to X. Fliegerkorps. Stab followed on 22 February, with II. and III./StG 1. The purpose of the transfer was to assist Hitler's Italian ally in the Battle of the Mediterranean. The first objectives were operations against the Mediterranean Fleet, Allied shipping passing between Sicily and Italy, and the Siege of Malta.

One of the first targets was the aircraft carrier HMS Illustrious. On 11 January 1941, II./StG 2 and I./StG 1 set out to attack Illustrious but chanced upon the light cruisers HMS Southampton and Gloucester. Hits were scored on both; Southampton was so badly damaged her navy escorts scuttled her—the group is credited with assisting the sinking. II./StG 2 struck the fatal blows against the ship. The attacks on the carrier failed to sink her but put her out of action for a year. II./StG 2 sent 43 Ju 87s with support from I./StG 1. Ten Italian SM 79s had drawn off the carrier's Fairey Fulmar fighters. Some 10 Ju 87s attacked the carrier unopposed. Witnessed by Andrew Cunningham, C-in-C of the Fleet from the battleship HMS Warspite, the Ju 87s scored six hits. One destroyed a gun, another hit near her bow, a third demolished another gun, while two hit the lift, wrecking the aircraft below deck, causing explosions of fuel and ammunition. Another went through the armoured deck and exploded deep inside the ship. Two further attacks were made without result. Badly damaged, but with her main engines still intact, she steered for the now dubious haven of Malta. The attack lasted six minutes; killed 126 crew members and wounded 91.

RAF Luqa was attacked on 18 January and one Ju 87 was shot down by fighters. On 19 January another two were lost over Malta bombing the aircraft carrier, with another damaged. On 5/6 February the HM Trawler Tourmaline was attacked. Force H shelled Genoa (Operation Grog), and so the group transferred to Sardinia on 9 February but did not succeed in finding the British ships. From there it was sent to Africa II./StG 1 claimed the last major success over Malta; the 26 February attack on Luqa destroyed most hangars, workshops and destroyed or damaged 17 to 19 aircraft. It cost the group three Ju 87s. III./StG 1 also took part in the attack. It lost two Ju 87s over Malta on 5 March 1941. Third group also attacked Malta convoys MW 6. They claimed two ships sunk, but British records show none were lost, but two were bombed at their berths. The group's commanding officer Helmut Mahlke returned with his Ju 87 heavily damaged by ground-fire.

7 and 8 Staffel were sent temporarily to North Africa to replace I./StG 1 which had been sent to the Balkans. The group continued with attacks against Valletta on 23 March, and the harbour on 11 April while Ta' Vnezja was bombed. An Italian Ju 87 unit was attached to bolster its strength. The group appears to have ceased operations over Malta in mid-April. II. and III./StG 1 continued attacks on Malta. On 9 May both groups bombed Malta. Amongst their losses was Oberleutnant Ulrich Heinze of 9 staffel, killed while engaging a British submarine in the harbour. II./StG 1 attacked another convoy on 9 May and withdrew to Greece on 12 May.

=== North Africa ===
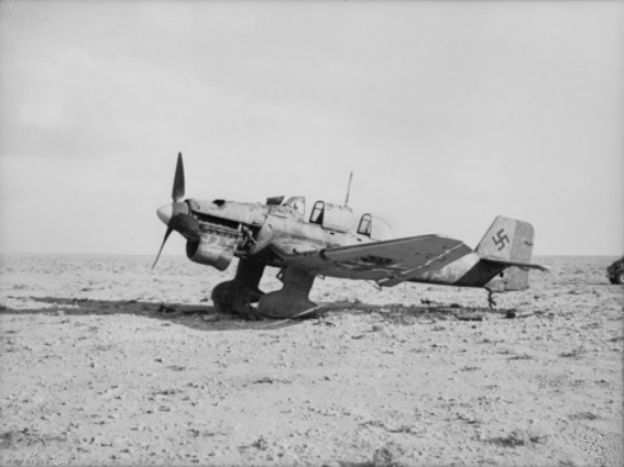
Ju 87 abandoned in Libya. The photograph shows all the distinct features of the aircraft

The opening phase of the North African Campaign began with a series of Italian defeats culminating in the disastrous Operation Compass, which destroyed much of the Italian North African Army. I./StG 1 deployed to Castel Benito, near Tripoli, Libya. The mission was to prevent a collapse of the Axis in the region by supporting the Afrika Korps. First group began attacking ports in Cyrenaica in preparation for Operation Sonnenblume. It remained there until May 1943, by that time it had been renamed II./StG 3.

On 14 February one crewman was killed by ground fire over El Agheila and four days later 12 Ju 87s attacked enemy positions near Marsa Brega, the Desert Air Force claimed five of the dive-bombers. On 22 February it hit the Royal Navy monitor Terror which was damaged in Benghazi. At this time it carried out attacks against British Army motorised transport and tanks wast of Marble Arch. The British reported the loss of 40 vehicles.

First group was ordered to Sofia in March and missed Erwin Rommel's offensives. It did not return until 25 April, to Castel Benito. By that time, the sole aerial opponent within the perimeter, No. 73 Squadron RAF, had withdrawn, that very day, because their airstrips had been rendered inoperable through bombing. It attacked the Operation Tiger convoy without success; although it committed all 28 aircraft. The group left for Greece on 28 May but returned on from 1 June, based at Derna. Targets around Sollum, Bardia and Capuzzo were bombed on 16 June. The group also attacked Allied forces surrounded in the Siege of Tobruk. The group suffered two losses to enemy aircraft. One was lost to ground-fire on 8 July and another four were lost to DAF fighters on 29 July 1941. On 25/26 October the group sank the fast Royal Navy minelayer HMS Latona (2,650 tons) off Bardia. The attacks on the Australian garrison at Tobruk were interrupted by an RAF attack on Derna which damaged five aircraft. On 20 November three to six Ju 87s from a 12-strong formation were lost to RAF fighters in the Bir el Gobi area.

II./StG 1 also operated intermittently in Africa. On 11 April an attack on Tobruk cost it three Ju 87s to ground-fire as it supported Sonnenblume, across Cyrenaica. One of its Staffel was staffed by experienced night-flying pilots, but it is unclear whether night operations were flown. III./StG 1, with its Italian contingent, supported the drive on Tobruk with attacks on shipping in the harbour on 12 and 14 April. On 17 Sollum harbour and anchored shipping was attacked as well as Tobruk's inner defences. On 19 April it turned north, and attacked the Maltese capital again. By 2 May it was supporting Italian forces fighting near Tobruk. Two days later, it switched back to attacking Malta's capital. On 8 May it departed Derna and went back to Trapani. On 23 May it deployed to Greece. It did not return to the North African Front.

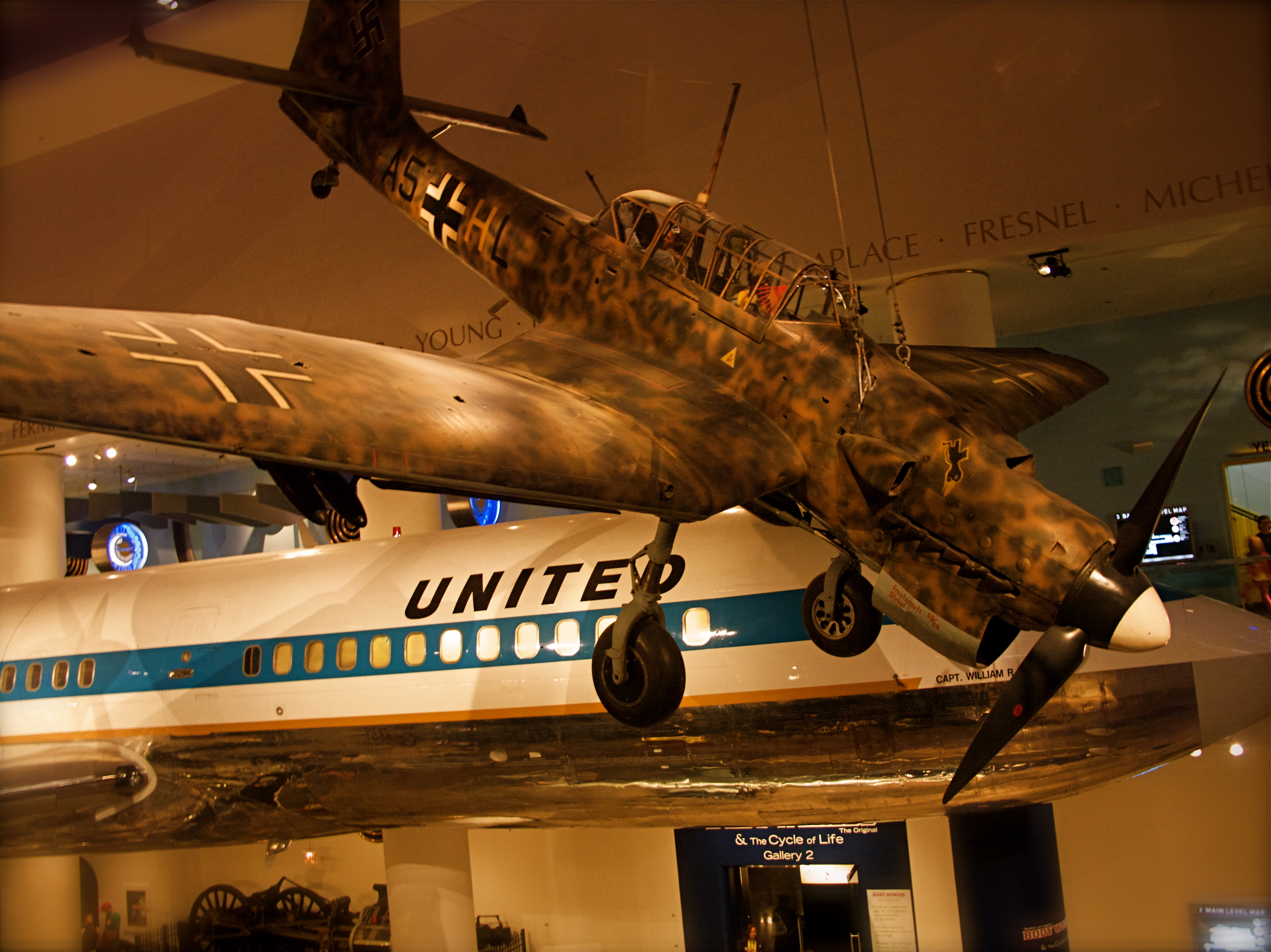
A StG 1 Ju 87 in the Museum of Science and Industry Chicago. It remains the only surviving aircraft from the geschwader.

I./StG 1 remained in Africa until January 1942. It resisted Operation Crusader, losing Hauptmann Gerhard Schmitt killed on 5 December. On 13 January it was renamed II./StG 3 and was not reformed until June 1943.

=== Balkans campaign ===
In March, the pro-German Yugoslav government was toppled. A furious Hitler ordered the attack on Greece to be expanded to include Kingdom of Yugoslavia. Operation Marita. The Luftwaffe committed StG 1, 2 and 77 to the campaign. StG 1 was reassigned to VIII. Fliegerkorps, under the command of von Richthofen, for the Greek campaign. I./StG 1 moved to Kraynitsi on 1 April, south west of Sofia, Bulgaria. It reported 24 Ju 87Rs available plus the attachment on Stab./StG 2, assigned for the duration of the invasions of Yugoslavia and Greece. III./StG 1 transferred to Argos, Greece to support the attack on Crete on 23 May and did not participate in the campaign on the mainland.

StG 1 did not support Operation Punishment, Hitler's retribution bombing of Belgrade. The wing does not appear on the order of battle in the north. StG 77 supported the attacks, with KG 2, 3 and 4 bombing the city. The dive bombers were ordered to attack airfields and anti-aircraft gun positions as the level bombers struck civil and government targets. Belgrade was badly damaged, with 2,271 people killed and 12,000 injured.

The first loss came on 7 April over Veria in northern Greece, when three staffel ran into Greek anti-aircraft fire. On 14 April 2 staffel lost a Ju 87 to a Hellenic Air Force-flown PZL P.11 near Trikala. The support operations were flown in support of the Battle of the Metaxas Line. First group was ordered back to Trapani, Sicily, and then back to Castel Benito on 25 April. On 8 May it was ordered to Elmas in Sardinia for action against the Tiger convoy. 28 Ju 87s attacked the convoy without success. It returned to Greece on 12 May, based at Argos for operations over Crete. The group suffered one loss in the Battle of Crete. Second group lost two Ju 87s over Crete. Richthofen and his Ju 87s in StG 1 and 77, forced the British to abandon the waters north of Crete by 23 May. The group remained in Africa, until British counter-attacks drove Rommel's forces out of Cyrenaica. It was renamed II./StG 3 on 13 January 1942.

=== Eastern Front ===
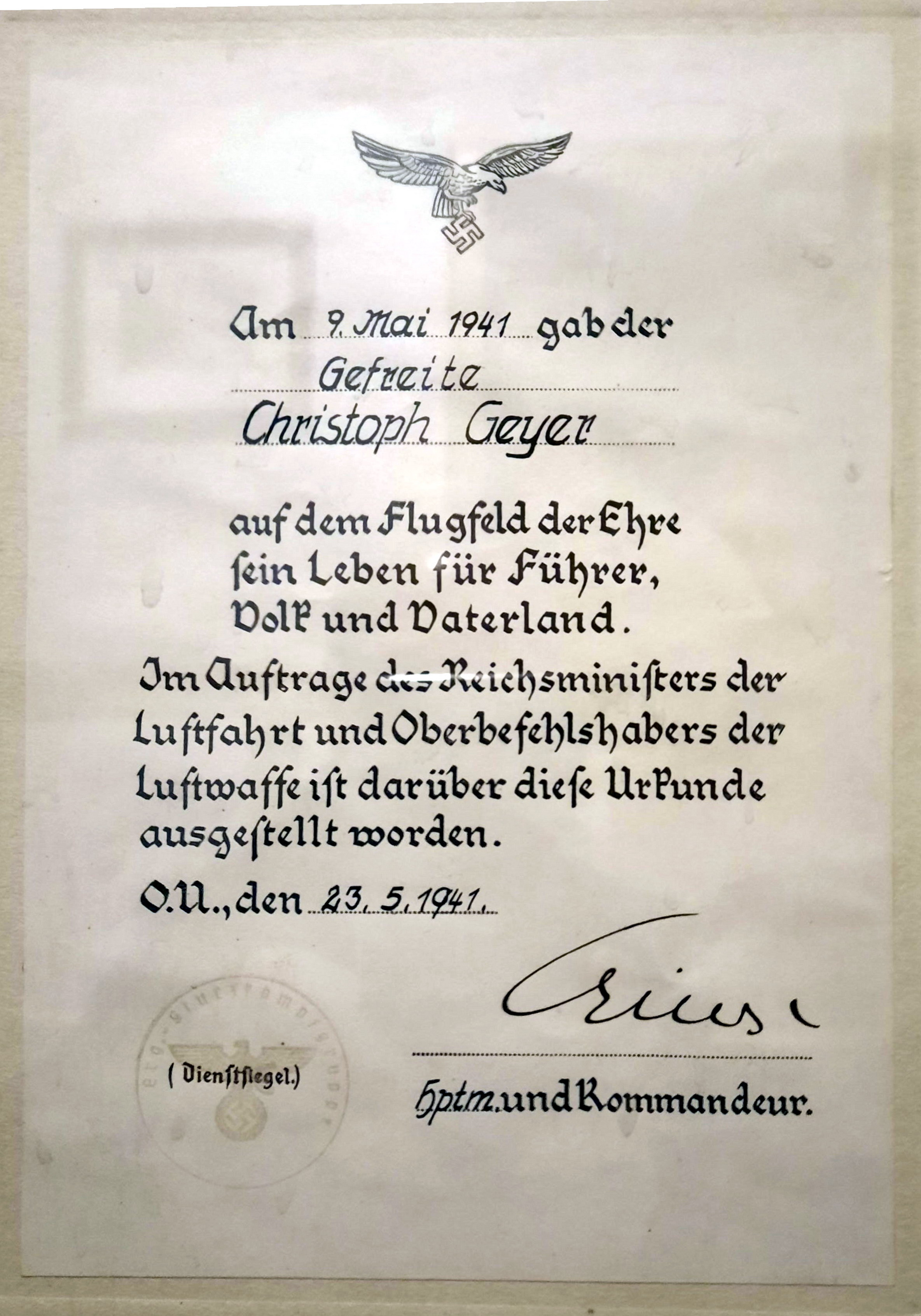
Official death notification (Sturzkampfgruppe), 1941

In June 1941, the remaining StG 1 groups (Stab and second group) moved to Suwałki, still under the command of VIII. Fliegerkorps. Second group mustered 39 Ju 87s with 28 ready for combat. III./StG was based at Dubowo. The group reported 24 Ju 87s operational from 39. The wing supported Army Group Centre in the opening phase of Operation Barbarossa, the war on the Eastern Front.

On 22 June the war began with the Luftwaffe attacking Red Air Force airfields. III./StG 1 was ordered to support the advance to Białystok and Minsk — Battle of Białystok–Minsk. Until 29 July it also supported German forces in the Battle of Smolensk. III./StG 1 attacked road traffic in around the Roslavl, Gomel and Bryansk regions as Army Group Centre advanced east to Moscow until the beginning of August.

II./StG 1 began supporting the advance in the Belarus SSR. It lost four Ju 87s over Minsk and supported the Smolensk operation while attacking targets in the Velikiye Luki area. Two crews were lost on 24 June. The first crew were killed but group commander Helmut Mahlke was shot down over Minsk but he made it back to German lines. On 8 July Mahlke was shot down a second time by a Mikoyan-Gurevich MiG-3, and he and his gunner were wounded in action. His wounds were such he was invalidated from flying again. Mahlke remained as commanding officer until replaced on 19 September by Major Peter Gassman. The days operations saved the 17th Panzer Division, of the 47th Panzer Corps, which had been surrounded by Soviet armour northwest of Orsha. StG 1 supported a second encirclement battle at Smolensk. The airmen of Luftflotte 2 claimed the destruction of 100 tanks, 1,500 trucks, 41 artillery pieces, 24 artillery batteries in the Smolensk sector alone, from 29 July to 5 August.

In early August Hitler shifted the emphasis of the air effort to Leningrad. VIII. Fliegerkorps was assigned to Luftflotte 1, supporting Army Group North, which now had its first Ju 87 groups. Stab., II., and III./StG 1. With III./StG 2 the dive bomber groups could must only 162 aircraft. Opposing them was the VVS Northern Front with 560 aircraft - though the VVS KBF was supporting the Soviet 8th Army in northern Estonia and attacking Berlin. 142 aircraft were also deployed in the Karelian Isthmus and Markian Popov, AOC commanding recalled the 2 BAD and 7 IAP to deal with the developing threat. The German forces carried out 1,126 sorties on 10 August, between I. and VIII. Fliegerkorps They claimed 10 tanks, more than 200 vehicles and 15 artillery batteries. In the Lake Ilmen area, German airmen reported tough opposition. As the German 16th and 18th armies moved into northern Russia and Estonia, VIII. Fliegerkorps dropped 3,300 tons of bombs in support. The wing's most notable casualty at this time was second groups' commanding officer, Anton Keil, killed on 29 August in the Toropets. Keil was replaced by Johann Zemsky. Keil had fallen to 191 IAP's Yegor Novikov. Keil attempted to force-land in Soviet territory but the Ju 87 overturned and they were killed. August operations had cost StG 1 20 aircraft.

In September third group was operating in northern Ukraine—apparently loaned to Luftflotte 2— and was supporting the Second Panzer Group at Konotop on 9th and attacking rail lines south of Romney. II./StG 1 attacking Soviet troop movements in support of the XLVII. Panzer Corps near Bryansk. They assisted Heinz Guderian's Panzer Group reach an seize bridgehead across the river Seym, halfway between Kiev an Kursk. III./StG 1 supported the Panzer Group's 3rd Panzer Division capture of a vital crossing point near Lokhvitsa on the Sula River. The unit flew 47 bombing missions against troop concentrations in the area and lost one aircraft. The success led to an order to close the pocket around Kiev the following ḍay. Some elements of both groups took part in the Kiev encirclement.

For the planned Battle of Moscow, Luftflotte 1 was formally relieved of all Ju 87 units in late September, and those supporting the Kiev operation were moved to Luftflotte 2. with the exception of StG 77. II./StG 1 supported the advances to Rzhev and Kalinin. On 2 December the group lost squadron leader Hauptmann Joachim Riedger in a mi-air collision. Plans to withdraw some of the squadrons for conversions to the Ju 87D were cancelled when the Soviet forces began a large-scale counter-offensive on 5 December. III./StG 1 supported the advance to Tula and Orel. The group was withdrawn on the day of the Soviet counter-offensive to Schweinfurt to convert onto the Ju 87D. It would not return until February 1942. At the end of Operation Barbarossa, StG 1 had lost 60 Stukas in aerial combat and one on the ground.

=== Supporting all three Army Groups ===
III./StG 1 returned in time to render valuable air support to the collapsing German front. Army Group Centre's lines were penetrated and the Red Army drove a deep wedge, or salient, into the German-held territory. StG 1 operated on the seam between Army Group North and Centre and helped contain the Soviet advance. One pilot Erich Hanne claimed 16 tanks and 26 artillery and anti-tank guns destroyed. The German air operations were critical in stabilising the front and preventing a general collapse on the ground. The subsequent fighting on the central sector continued for over a year, and became known as the Battles of Rzhev. On 1 March 1942 II./StG 1 recorded 42 Ju 87s operational. On 13 May, while in Rzhev, the group supported Operation Nordpol, a failed attempt to surround the 39th and 29th Soviet armies.

On 17 May 1942 II./StG 1 was ordered to Konstantinovka in the Donets Basin, in preparation for Operation Blue, the summer offensive to the Caucasus. The wing was not sent as an emergency force to the Second Battle of Kharkov, which StG 2 and 77 were sent. Another experienced pilot was lost on 21 May; Group Commander Hauptmann von Malapert-Neufville was killed north of Orel. On 17 June elements of the group bombed Soviet partisans positions after an attack on a train in the Shukovka area, to the rear of the Second Panzer Army. The group moved south and supported the advance during the Battle of Stalingrad. On 26 August, three days into the battle, it shared in the destruction of 40 tanks belonging to the Soviet 63rd Army.

On 14 October II./StG 1 supported a concerted effort to capture the city. The Luftwaffe flew 2,000 sorties and dropped 600 tons of bombs on Soviet-held areas. With II./StG 2 and I./StG 77 53 dive-bomber missions were flown and 320 individual sorties. There was no opposition by the VVS. Air support enabled the 6th army to capture the Volgograd Tractor Plant. The following day the Ju 87s suppressed Soviet artillery on the opposite bank and cut the flow of supplies to the defending 62nd army. By 29 October, the 62nd army were down to 47,000 men and 19 tanks fragmented into three groups. The Germans control of the air and 6:1 numerical superiority failed to eliminate the small Soviet pockets on the west bank of the Volga.

In November 1942 the Red Army began Operation Uranus, which trapped four Axis armies in the city. The group evacuated to Oblivskaya but 5 and 6 staffel were trapped and destroyed in the fighting. Only ZG 1, StG 2 and 77 were called on to provide air support for Operation Winter Storm, the failed relief effort.

On 23 November 1942 second group handed over all remaining aircraft to StG 2. It transferred to Rostov-on-Don to refit. On 1 January 1943 it had only a single aircraft before re-equipping in February and then fighting against Soviet spearheads at the Rossosh and Dnepropetrovsk regions, often flying from Poltava. From the end of March to April 1943 the group was transferred to Bryansk for rest and refitting.

III./StG 1 remained near Luga, after transferring from Schweinfurt. It had 33 Ju 87D-1s, nine Ju 87R-2s and five Ju 87R-4s by 27 February 1942. From Luga, it carried out heavy bombing attacks on the Baltic Fleet from 4 April (Operation Eisstoss). Thus far, the Soviet fleet had remained intact in the fortress island of Kronstadt, despite a relatively effective dive-bomber offensive in September 1941. On 4 April 1942 62 Ju 87s from III./StG 1, I., and II.,/StG 2, supported by 33 Junkers Ju 88s from KG 1 and 37 high-level Heinkel He 111 bombers from KG 4 carried out a mass-attack. The operation damaged one battleship, four cruisers, one destroyer and one minelayer.

In April the wing flew support operations for two pickets of Wehrmacht forces—Kholm and Demyansk Pockets. Along with attacks on naval yards, the group also bombed convoys, road on marine, on Lake Ladoga, and the Road of Life and sank a small number of barges. The remainder of the month was taken up defeating the Lyuban Offensive Operation.

In July III./StG 1 was rushed to Orel when the Southwestern Front, equipped with 10th, 16th and 61st armies, attacked the Second Panzer Army's sector. On 7 July flew 29 missions against Soviet tanks and columns claiming 7 tanks and 6 trucks destroyed. The next day it flew 83 sorties, and claimed 20 tanks destroyed and 15 damaged and another 14 trucks destroyed. On 9 July the group put up 52 sorties, and bombing attacks claimed four tanks and six damaged; on 10 July 44 missions were flown and three tanks were destroyed and 7 damaged; 11 July four tanks were claimed destroyed and five damaged in 33 missions. Over the next two days, 48 dive bomber missions returned claims for two tanks destroyed and eight damaged with another four destroyed or damaged.

III./StG 1 briefly returned to Leningrad and operated around Lake Ilmen. On the last day of July it was sent to Rzhev after a Soviet offensive began on 30th. It flew close air support for the 3rd Panzer Army and 9th army. Operation Wirbelwind was ordered to shorten Army Group Centre's frontline by destroying the 10th and 16th Armies in the Kirov and Sukhinichi region. Third group supported the 4th and 2nd Panzer Army, and then countered the Soviet Kozelsk Offensive. Both the German and Soviet offensives failed. In August the group moved back north, to Lenningrad, losing Hauptmann Fischer killed on 26 October.

In mid-December 1942 the group moved back to the central sector and fought in the Battle for Velikiye Luki. On 1 February 1943 third group claimed 70 trucks and six companies of infantry "destroyed" in 48 missions. The following day the pilots claimed 65 vehicles and four companies of infantry as destroyed in 33 missions, and on 3 February, two companies of infantry, 80 vehicles, 11 tanks knocked out. As the fighting intensified, from 5 to 23 February flew 353 bombing missions, claiming seven tanks, 70 to 80 vehicles, 12 companies, 300 infantry soldiers killed and 10 to 15 houses destroyed.

=== Kursk and disbandment ===
The Eastern Front stabilised for the Germans after the Third Battle of Kharkov ended in March 1943. The Kuban bridgehead remained an area of heavy fighting but the Luftwaffe prepared for Operation Citadel, an offensive to shorten the line and destroy Soviet forces in a salient near Kursk. II. and III. Gruppe were ordered to carry out preliminary attacks and Soviet assembly points and tank concentrations. On 22 May 1943, II./StG 1 attacked Kursk marshalling yards with 36 aircraft. The mission was a disaster for the Germans—eight Ju 87s were shot down, three severely damaged and six lightly damaged with the loss of one killed, 16 missing and two wounded. By 5 July, however, the unit fielded 42 Ju 87s—40 of the D-3 variant. I./StG 1 fielded a weaker force of 32 Ju 87Ds while third group also had 42 Ju 87s

The wing's first and second group were based east of Orel for Citadel. They were joined by I./StG 1, which had been formed for a second time after its initial formation had been renamed III./StG 3. The group was formed by renaming I./StG 5 at Gorodets near Luga. The group was given Ju 87Ds. The unit was based south of Orel to support the German 9th Army while the other two groups supported the 2nd Panzer Army to the north. StG 1 was involved in the first combat of the operation, which became known as the Battle of Kursk. 7. Staffel lost a crew in combat with the 54 GIAP fighter regiment. The German fighter forces performed effectively on the first day—I. Fliegerkorps' StG 1 and 3 flew 647 bombing missions and lost four aircraft to ground-fire; though Soviet sources insist the aforementioned crew were shot down by fighters. StG 1 supported the XXXXI Panzer Corps in an attempt to surround the Soviet 13th and 48th armies. The operation failed with most German air units supporting the right flank—II./StG 1, escorted by I./JG 54 was in action on 6 July. Among the losses was Knight's Cross holder Kurt-Albert Pape, commander of 3. Staffel was killed in action against 1 GIAD. Pape had flown over 350 missions and was lost with another crew. The wing put up 55 Ju 87s on that particular mission. The air attacks allowed the Germans to capture 1-e Maya and draw closer to Ponyri. The Ju 87s flew 60 to 70 in number to support the 18th Panzer Division against the 6th Guards Airborne Division. The flying units of the northern sector claimed 14 tanks, 22 artillery pieces, 60 vehicles and eight ammunition stores in addition to 22 tanks damaged and 25 guns silenced on 7 July. The exhausted XXXXI Panzerkorps captured Ponyri and Teployte. The following day the 4th Panzer Division attempted a breakthrough and failed—the 378 Ju 87 missions were flown in support of the XXXXVII Panzerkorps; only five tanks were claimed in bad weather. The entire wing was airborne to support the 9 July assault by the XXXXVII Panzerkorps, which failed.

The Luftwaffe held air superiority over the Orel sector. On 12 July this changed with Operation Kutuzov, Soviet forces achieved a major breakthrough and advanced speedily. The German air units from 1. Fliegerdivision were able to claim 35 tanks, 50 vehicles and 14 artillery guns destroyed. The following day the claimed 32 tanks and 25 more damaged with another 50 vehicles. On 14 July the 18th Panzer Division was defeated in a tank battle against the 11th Guards Army and the Soviet 5th Tank Corps raced to seize Bolkhov. StG 1 responded to the 53rd Army Corps' calls for assistance. They lost four Ju 87s in air combat with the 49 IAP. Effective Soviet fighter defences limited the air attacks to claiming no more than 12 tanks. The Luftwaffe was able to play an important role in preventing the Soviet offensive from destroying the 9th Army and 2nd Panzer Army from 16 to 31 July; StG 1 operated over this sector at this time and recorded two losses on 17 July.

By 31 July III./StG 1 lost 10 aircraft, II./StG 1 lost seven, and I./StG 1 lost nine in action. The number of damaged aircraft is not mentioned. Personnel losses for first group amounted to six killed and four missing. Second group lost five killed, one wounded. Third group suffered five killed, five missing and eight wounded from 5 to 31 July.

In August 1943 the Red Army and Red Air Force followed up their victory at Kursk and liberated Eastern Ukraine. South of Orel, from 2 to 8 August III./StG 1 lost five Ju 87s and three damaged with four men killed and two wounded. The group was fighting over Studenka by 8 August. It moved north on 12 August to support the defence of Smolensk. Nine aircraft were recorded lost to the 16 September with four killed, five wounded and four missing. From the 16 September to its dissolution on 18 October the group was located at Gomel and Bobruisk supporting the 4th Panzer Army in Northern Ukraine. The group was renamed III./SG 1.

II./StG 1 fought over Kholm, Smolensk and Kharkov in the same period. On 15 September the unit was reduced to a single staffel when it lost five Ju 87s destroyed, seven badly damaged and another seven lightly damaged in a Soviet air attack. The group withdrew to Orsha where it maintained a rear echelon. On 13 October group commander Major Otto Ernst was wounded. The group was renamed II./SG 1 at Bobruisk or Mogilev on 18 October.

I./StG 1 was renamed at Gorodok on 18 October. Over the course of August to October it had lost 16 Ju 87s 13 men killed and two missing.

== Anti-tank warfare ==
On 17 June 1943 Panzerjägerstaffel/StG 1 (tank hunting squadron) was created. It was equipped with Ju 87G cannon-armed aircraft specifically for engaging Soviet armour. Little is known about this unit. It was known to have fought at Kursk from 12 and 13 July 1943 when Luftflotte 6, to which it was attached, claimed 67/68 tanks destroyed. It is known to have lost two aircraft, one killed and wounded. It was renamed 10.(Pz)/SG 77 at Orsha on 18 October 1943.

== Commanding officers ==
• Oberstleutnant Walter Hagen	18 November 1939	–	30 March 1943
• Oberstleutnant Gustav Preßler	1 April 1943	–	18 October 1943 (renamed to Schlachtgeschwader 1)

== See also ==
Organization of the Luftwaffe during World War II
