= Tadeusz Olejnik =

Polish historian

Tadeusz Olejnik (born 1935) is a Polish historian. He published works about regional history, World War II and history of the Polish fire service.

Director of the Museum of Wieluń Land in Wieluń. From 1997 until his retirement in 2005 professor of the Piotrków branch of the Jan Kochanowski University. Member of the Polish Academy of Sciences.

== Selected works ==
- Pieczęcie i herby miast ziemi wieluńskiej (1971)
- Towarzystwa ochotniczych straży ogniowych w Królestwie Polskim (1996)
- Leksykon miasta Wielunia (1998)
- Wieluń. Dzieje miasta 1793–1945 (2003)
- Wieluń: polska Guernica (2004)
- Leksykon miasta Sieradza (2006)
- Leksykon miasta Wielunia, 2nd expanded edition (2007)
