= Herbert Bauer (pilot) =

German officer and Knight's Cross recipient

- Born: 16 April 1919; Innsbruck, Austria
- Died: 24 March 1997 (aged 77); Buenos Aires, Argentina
- Burial place: German Cemetery, Buenos Aires
- Military career
- Allegiance: Nazi Germany
- Branch: Luftwaffe
- Service years: 1938–1945
- Rank: Major (major)
- Units: StG 2, SG 103, SG 2
- Commands: 3./StG 2, II./SG 103, I./SG 2
- Conflicts: World War II: Operation Barbarossa; Battle of Białystok–Minsk; Battle of Smolensk (1941); Siege of Leningrad; Belgorod-Khar'kov Offensive Operation
- Awards: Knight's Cross of the Iron Cross with Oak Leaves
- Other work: Advisor to Argentine Air Force

Herbert Bauer (16 April 1919 – 24 March 1997) was a highly decorated Major in the Luftwaffe during World War II, and one of only 882 recipients of the Knight's Cross of the Iron Cross with Oak Leaves. The Knight's Cross of the Iron Cross, and its variants were the highest awards in the military and paramilitary forces of Nazi Germany during World War II. Herbert Bauer is credited with flying 1071 missions during the war. After the war Herbert Bauer acted as an advisor to the Argentine Air Force.

== Early life ==
Bauer was born on 16 April 1919 in Innsbruck, then in the Republic of German-Austria. He was the son of a Feuerwerker, an ordnance specialist in the Austrian Armed Forces. He grew up a devoted Nazi from a young age, being a member of the Hitler Youth. At the age of 19, Bauer officially joined the Nazi party. From 1 July to 25 October 1938, Bauer completed the compulsory labour service (Reichsarbeitsdienst). On 7 November, he joined the military service of the Luftwaffe, serving with 3rd Battery of Flak-Regiment 4, an anti-aircraft artillery regiment.

== World War II ==
World War II in Europe began on Friday 1 September 1939 when German forces invaded Poland. On 1 December, Bauer was transferred to 2. Kompanie (2nd company) of Flak-Regiment (mot.) 22. With this unit, Bauer was promoted to Leutnant (second lieutenant) on 1 February 1940. From 29 April to 30 September 1940, Bauer began his flight training at the A/B Fliegerschule (flight school for the pilot license) of Fliegerausbildungs-Regiment 21 (flight training regiment) in Magdeburg. (Note: Flight training in the Luftwaffe progressed through the levels A1, A2 and B1, B2, referred to as A/B flight training. A training included theoretical and practical training in aerobatics, navigation, long-distance flights and dead-stick landings. The B courses included high-altitude flights, instrument flights, night landings and training to handle the aircraft in difficult situations.) On 1 October, he was posted to the Stuka-Schule 2, the dive bomber training school in Graz.

On 16 February 1941, Bauer completed his supplementary training with the Ergänzungsgruppe (a training unit) of Sturzkampfgeschwader 2 "Immelmann" (StG 26—2nd Dive Bomber Wing) and was then posted to I. Gruppe (1st group) of StG 2. Serving with this Gruppe, Bauer flew his first combat mission on 7 July in area of Vitebsk during Operation Barbarossa, the German invasion of the Soviet Union. On this mission, Bauer had a mid-air collision with a Soviet fighter aircraft. Bauer's regular aerial gunner was Oberfeldwebel Walter Linke who flew with Bauer until late 1944 when Linke was transferred to a flight school. On 20 July, Bauer was awarded the Iron Cross 2nd Class (Eisernes Kreuz zweiter Klasse) and the Iron Cross 1st Class (Eisernes Kreuz erster Klasse) on 30 October.

On 24 April 1942 during a mission against the Soviet fleet moored at Kronstadt, Bauer's Junkers Ju 87 came under attack by a Lavochkin-Gorbunov-Gudkov LaGG-3 from 11 GvIAP (Guards Fighter Aviation Regiment—Gvardeyskiy Istrebitelny Aviatsionny Polk). In this attack, Bauer was severely injured but managed to nurse his aircraft back to the airfield at Krasnoye Selo. During his convalescence, he was promoted to Oberleutnant (first lieutenant) on 1 February 1943 and returned to his unit on 25 February. On 1 June, Bauer was appointed Staffelkapitän (squadron leader) of 3. Staffel (3rd squadron) of StG 2. The Staffel was subordinated to I. Gruppe and at the time commanded by Major Bruno Dilley.

Bauer was promoted to Hauptmann (captain) on 1 March 1944. On 23 November, Bauer was appointed Gruppenkommandeur (group commander) of I. Gruppe of Schlachtgeschwader 2 "Immelmann", succeeding Hauptmann Kurt Lau who was transferred. Bauer was promoted to Major (major) on 1 March 1945.

== Later life ==
At the end of the war, Bauer was taken as a POW. He escaped to Italy with Hans-Ulrich Rudel and Ernst Niermann, along with another pilot and a technical officer. The group was aided by former SS officers Walter Spitaler and Karl Nicolussi-Leck, the latter of which was responsible for smuggling several prominent Nazi figures, including famed Luftwaffe general Adolf Galland, into Italy and on to South America. They initially staying in Bozen while arranging to flee to South America. In April 1948, Bauer applied for an International Committee of the Red Cross (ICRC) travel document. Unusually for a German official taking this route of escape, he listed his real name and place of birth on his application, and his occupation as a pilot. He did, however, present himself as an ethnic German from Czechoslovakia, to pass as one of the now stateless Sudeten Germans, qualifying him for resettlement. The Vatican Commission for Refugees confirmed Bauer's information, and he successfully emigrated to Argentina, where he connected other German officers and Nazi party members who had fled to the country. Bauer died on 24 March 1997 at the age of 77 in Buenos Aires, Argentina. He was buried at the German Cemetery.

== Summary of career ==
=== Aerial victory claims ===
According to Obermaier, Bauer flew 1,071 combat missions, including 70 with the Focke-Wulf Fw 190. He is credited with eleven aerial victories, one with the Ju 87 and ten with the Fw 190, plus further twelve unconfirmed claims. In addition, he claimed 51 tanks and two armoured trains destroyed on the ground, and hits on the Soviet battleship Oktyabrskaya Revolutsiya and a cruiser moored in Kronstadt harbor. Hooton lists him with having flown more that 1,300 combat missions. Mathews and Foreman, authors of Luftwaffe Aces — Biographies and Victory Claims, researched the German Federal Archives and state that he was credited with approximately eleven aerial victory claims, all of which claimed on the Eastern Front.

=== Awards ===
- Flugzeugführerabzeichen
- Front Flying Clasp of the Luftwaffe in Gold with Pennant "1000"
- Iron Cross (1939)
  - 2nd Class (20 July 1941)
  - 1st Class (30 October 1941)
- Wound Badge (1939)
  - in Black
  - in Silver
  - in Gold
- Honor Goblet of the Luftwaffe on 8 December 1941 as Leutnant and pilot
- German Cross in Gold on 27 March 1942 as Leutnant in the 1./Sturzkampfgeschwader 2
- Knight's Cross of the Iron Cross with Oak Leaves
  - Knight's Cross on 31 December 1943 as Oberleutnant and Staffelkapitän of the 3./Sturzkampfgeschwader 2 "Immelmann"
  - 618th Oak Leaves on 30 September 1944 as Hauptmann and Gruppenkommandeur of the I./Schlachtgeschwader 2 "Immelmann" (Note: According to Scherzer as Gruppenkommandeur of the II./Schlachtgeschwader 103.)
