= Daisy cutter =

Daisy cutter may refer to:

- Daisy cutter (fuse), a type of fuse designed to detonate an aerial bomb at or above ground level
- BLU-82, a type of bomb nicknamed Daisy Cutter in Vietnam
- In cricket, a ball that bounces multiple times before reaching the batsman
- A rarely used term for a sharply struck ground ball in baseball, used mostly in Vintage base ball
- A song on the album Uplifter by 311
- A pale ale brewed by Half Acre Beer Company of Chicago, Illinois
