= Ernst Kupfer =

German World War II Stuka pilot

- Born: 2 July 1907; Coburg
- Died: 6 November 1943 (aged 36); 60 km (37 mi) north of Thessaloniki, Greece
- Military career
- Allegiance: Weimar Republic; Nazi Germany
- Branch: Army; Luftwaffe
- Service years: 1928–43
- Rank: Oberst
- Commands: StG 2
- Conflicts: World War II: Battle of Stalingrad; Battle of Kursk
- Awards: Knight's Cross of the Iron Cross with Oak Leaves and Swords (posthumous)

Ernst Kupfer (2 July 1907 – 6 November 1943) was a ground-attack pilot in the Luftwaffe of Nazi Germany during World War II who commanded a wing (StG 2) of Stuka aircraft. He was a recipient of the Knight's Cross of the Iron Cross with Oak Leaves and Swords.

== Career ==
On 1 October 1928, Kupfer joined the military, serving with the Bavarian Cavalry Regiment 17, 5th Escadron. From 1 May 1936 to 3 March 1937, he returned to university in preparation for his Dr. jur. degree (Doctor of Law), which he attained on 4 March 1937.

Kupfer was appointed acting Geschwaderkommodore (Wing Commander) of Sturzkampfgeschwader 2 (StG 2—2nd Dive-Bomber Wing) on 13 February 1943. He led StG 2 in the battles of the Kuban bridgehead and Operation Citadel. In April and May, several other fighter and ground attack groups augmented his command. Following the failure of Operation Citadel in July 1943, he took command of all local ground attack units, named Gefechtsverband "Kupfer" (Combat Detachment "Kupfer"). He flew 636 combat missions and was shot down three times, all by ground fire.

On 1 September 1943, Kupfer was appointed General of the Ground Attack [aircraft] (General der Schlachtflieger) and promoted to Oberstleutnant. In this role he handled the procurement of the Focke-Wulf Fw 190, which was to replace the old and obsolete Junkers Ju 87 and especially the Henschel Hs 123. For this purpose he flew and visited a number of Schlachtgeschwader (ground attack wings) to meet with the various Geschwaderkommodore (wing commanders). He visited Oberstleutnant Kurt Kuhlmey, commander of Schlachtgeschwader 3, in early November 1943 and was killed when his Heinkel He 111 crashed returning to his base in bad weather on 6 November 1943. His body lay undiscovered until 17 November. He received a posthumous promotion to Oberst (Colonel) and was posthumously awarded the Knight's Cross of the Iron Cross with Oak Leaves and Swords.

== Awards ==
- German Cross in Gold on 15 October 1942 as Major in the II./StG 2
- Iron Cross (1939) 2nd and 1st class
- Ehrenpokal der Luftwaffe on 14 October 1942 as Hauptmann and Staffelkapitän
- Knight's Cross of the Iron Cross with Oak Leaves and Swords
  - Knight's Cross on 23 November 1941 as Hauptmann and Staffelkapitän of the 7./StG 2 "Immelmann"
  - 173rd Oak Leaves on 8 January 1943 as Major and Gruppenkommandeur of the II./StG 2 "Immelmann"
  - 62nd Swords on 11 April 1944 (posthumous) as Oberst and former Geschwaderkommodore of StG 2 "Immelmann"

Military offices
Preceded by Oberstleutnant Paul-Werner Hozzel	Commander of Sturzkampfgeschwader 2 Immelmann; 13 February 1943 – 6 November 1943	Succeeded by Oberleutnant Hans-Karl Stepp
Preceded by none	General der Schlachtflieger; October 1943 – 6 November 1943	Succeeded by Oberstleutnant Hubertus Hitschhold
