= Paul-Werner Hozzel =

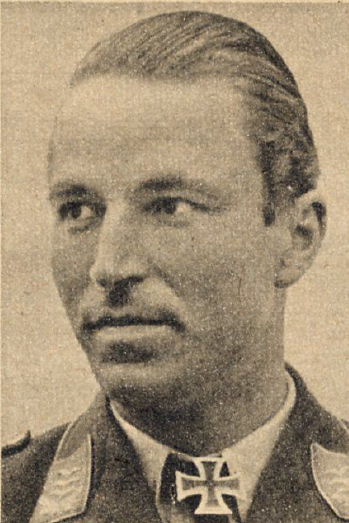
- Born: 16 October 1910
- Died: 7 January 1997 (aged 86)
- Military career
- Allegiance: Weimar Republic (to 1933); Nazi Germany; West Germany
- Branch: Luftwaffe; German Air Force
- Service years: 1931–45; 1956–69
- Rank: Oberstleutnant; Brigadegeneral (Bundeswehr)
- Commands: I./StG 1 StG 2
- Conflicts: World War II: Invasion of Poland; Battle of France; invasion of Norway; Kanalkampf
- Awards: Knight's Cross of the Iron Cross with Oak Leaves

Paul-Werner Hozzel (16 October 1910 – 7 January 1997) was a ground attack pilot in the Luftwaffe of Nazi Germany during World War II. He was a recipient of the Knight's Cross of the Iron Cross. Following the war, Hozzel joined the Bundeswehr of West Germany and retired as Brigadegeneral.

== Early life and career ==
Hozzel, the son of a shipping broker, was born on 16 October 1910 in Hamburg. In April 1931, following graduation with his Abitur, he volunteered for military service with Artillerie-Regiment 2, an artillery regiment of 2nd Division of the Reichswehr based in Schwerin. On 1 March 1934, Hozzel transferred to the Luftwaffe als Leutnant (second lieutenant).

== World War II ==
At the outbreak of World War II he participated in the Poland campaign in 1939 with the Sturzkampfgeschwaders 1 (StG 1—1st Dive Bomber Wing). This unit also participated in the Battle of France and in the Operation Weserübung. Hozzel was the first Stuka pilot to be awarded the Knight's Cross of the Iron Cross (Ritterkreuz des Eisernen Kreuzes) on 8 May 1940. He, Oberleutnant Elmar Schaefer, Leutnant Martin Möbus, and Unteroffizier Gerhard Grenzel, received this award for the destruction of the French destroyer Bison and the British destroyer HMS Afridi.

Hozzel was appointed commander of Sturzkampfgeschwader 2 on 16 October 1941. With SG 2, he fought in the Battle of Stalingrad, the Geschwader flew 12,000 combat missions in this engagement.

It was then tasked to form "Gefechtsverband Hozzel" from parts of the Stuka-Geschwaders 1, 2 and 77 participating in the battles around Dnipropetrovsk. Hozzel was awarded the Knight's Cross of the Iron Cross with Oak Leaves (Ritterkreuz des Eisernen Kreuzes mit Eichenlaub) on 14 April 1943. He finished the war in a staff position of Luftflotte 1. He had been tasked with its leadership in the Courland Pocket and went into Soviet captivity as a prisoner of war. He was repatriated on 16 January 1956.

Later in 1956 he joined the Bundeswehr and retired as Brigadegeneral on 30 September 1969.

== Awards ==
- Iron Cross (1939)
  - 2nd Class (14 September 1939)
  - 1st Class (5 May 1940)
- Knight's Cross of the Iron Cross with Oak Leaves
  - Knight's Cross on 8 May 1940 as Hauptmann and Gruppenkommandeur of the I./StG 1
  - 230th Oak Leaves on 14 April 1943 Oberstleutnant and Geschwaderkommodore of StG 2 "Immelmann"

Military offices
Preceded by Oberstleutnant Oskar Dinort	Commander of Sturzkampfgeschwader 2 Immelmann; 16 October 1941 – 13 February 1943	Succeeded by Oberstleutnant Dr. Ernst Kupfer
