= Oskar Dinort =

German World War II pilot (1901-1965)

- Born: 23 June 1901; Berlin-Charlottenburg, German Empire
- Died: 27 May 1965 (aged 63); Cologne, West Germany
- Military career
- Allegiance: Weimar Republic; Nazi Germany
- Branch: Reichsheer (Reichswehr); Luftwaffe (Wehrmacht)
- Service years: 1919–1945
- Rank: Generalmajor
- Commands: StG 2
- Conflicts: World War II
- Awards: Knight's Cross of the Iron Cross with Oak Leaves

Oskar Dinort (23 June 1901 – 27 May 1965) was a German general and ground attack aircraft pilot during World War II.

== Early life and career ==
Oskar Dinort was born in Berlin-Charlottenburg. He volunteered for military service in 1919 and joined the Freikorps der Gardekavallerie-Schützendivision, becoming a Fähnrich in Infanterie-Regiment Nr. 2 in 1921. He was promoted to Leutnant in 1923. He was an enthusiastic glider pilot. Soon after he was promoted to Oberleutnant in 1928, he set a 14 hours and 43 minutes Gliding World Record. He won the Deutschlandflug in 1931. He had participated in the second FAI International Tourist Plane Contest Challenge 1930, finishing in 10th place.

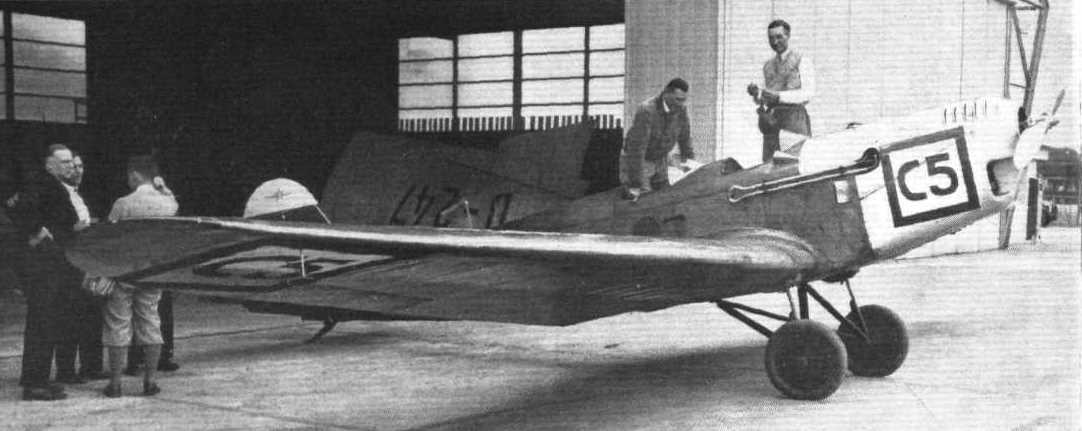
Klemm Kl 26 Va (Argus As 8) which Lieutenant Dinort flew to victory.

Dinort was transferred to the still secret Luftwaffe in 1934 where he was posted to the "Reklamestaffel Mitteldeutschland" (Advertisement Staffel). His next posting was as a Hauptmann (captain) in the Stab of I./Jagdgeschwader 132 (JG 132—132nd Fighter Wing) until he was called into the Reichsluftfahrtministerium (Ministry of Aviation) by Ernst Udet on 31 March 1935.

On 4 January 1936, Dinort was tasked with creation of III. Gruppe of Jagdgeschwader 134 (JG 134—134th Fighter Wing) and appointed as its Gruppenkommandeur (group commander). Initially, the unit was based at Döberitz and equipped with the Heinkel He 51 biplane.

== World War II ==
After commanding I./Sturzkampfgeschwader 2 "Immelmann" (StG 2) in Poland, Major Dinort served as Geschwaderkommodore (wing commander) of StG 2 from October 1939 to October 1941. On 4 July 1940, in between the official dated given for the Battle of France and Battle of Britain, he led a highly successful attack on Convoy OA 178. He received the Knight's Cross of the Iron Cross with Oak Leaves in July 1941.

During operations over Greece and Crete in April–May 1941 crews of StG 2 believed the blast effect of their bombs used against troops in Greece was greatly reduced because the bombs penetrated the ground before exploding. The solution was to fit 60 cm metal rods welded to the front of the bombs, with an 8 cm metal disc on the end of the rod. The rods themselves received the nickname Dinort-stäbe, or Dinort's rods — similar in concept to the daisy cutter device of American invention) after the originator of the idea, Oskar Dinort, which caused the bombs to detonate some 30 cm above the ground, maximising their blast.

On 15 October 1941 Dinort left StG. 2, taking up a staff position. In 1944 he was appointed to command 3. Fliegerschuldivision and in late 1944 promoted to Generalmajor. Held by the British after the war ended, Dinort remained in captivity until 1947. He eventually settled in Dortmund after his release. He later worked in aviation research in Chile.

Dinort died in Cologne, West Germany, on 27 May 1965.

== Awards ==
- Bulgarian Order of Bravery (3rd Class 1st Grade)
- Wehrmacht Long Service Award 4th to 2nd Class
- Front Flying Clasp of the Luftwaffe for Combat Pilots in Gold
- Iron Cross (1939)
  - 2nd Class (20 September 1939)
  - 1st Class (11 May 1940)
- Knight's Cross of the Iron Cross with Oak Leaves
  - Knight's Cross on 20 June 1940 as Major and Geschwaderkommodore of StG 2 "Immelmann" (Note: According to Scherzer as Gruppenkommandeur of the I./StG 2 "Immelmann".)
  - 21st Oak Leaves on 14 July 1941 as Oberstleutnant and Geschwaderkommodore of StG 2 "Immelmann"

== Notes ==
Military offices
Preceded by none	Commander of Sturzkampfgeschwader 2 Immelmann; 15 October 1939 – 16 October 1941	Succeeded by Oberstleutnant Paul-Werner Hozzel
