= Hans-Karl Stepp =

- Born: 14 September 1914; Gießen
- Died: 12 December 2006 (aged 92); Leipzig
- Burial place: Südfriedhof
- Relatives: Dietrich Peltz (brother in law)
- Military career
- Allegiance: Nazi Germany
- Branch: Luftwaffe
- Service years: 1936–1945
- Rank: Oberstleutnant (lieutenant colonel)
- Commands: StG 2
- Conflicts: World War II
- Awards: Knight's Cross of the Iron Cross with Oak Leaves

Hans-Karl Stepp (2 September 1914 – 12 December 2006) was a German ground attack pilot and wing commander during World War II. He was a recipient of the Knight's Cross of the Iron Cross with Oak Leaves, a grade of the highest award in the military and paramilitary forces of Nazi Germany during World War II.

== Early life and career ==
Stepp was born on 2 September 1914 in Gießen as son to a University professor. Stepp studied eight semesters of law in Tübingen, Breslau and Munich before joining the Luftwaffe as Fahnenjunker on 6 April 1936. He was assigned to II. Gruppe of Sturzkampfgeschwader 162 (StG 162—162nd Diver Bomber Wing) in July 1936 before attending the Luftkriegsschule in Dresden. Stepp received his commission to Leutnant (second lieutenant) on 1 January 1938. In 1939 he transferred back to II./StG 162 which became I./StG 76 on 1 May 1939.

== Second World War ==
Stepp fought in the Invasion of Poland and the Battle of France in the opening phase of the Second World War. He was awarded the Iron Cross second and first class, the latter on 15 June 1940. Stepp was transferred to Sturzkampfgeschwader 2 (StG 2—2nd Dive Bomber Wing) in May 1941. He became the wing's adjutant and flew with the Stabstaffel (command flight). He was awarded the Honour Goblet of the Luftwaffe (Ehrenpokal der Luftwaffe) on 9 September 1941 as Oberleutnant on the Eastern Front. Stepp became a Staffelkapitän and led 7. Staffel (7th squadron) of StG 2. He was awarded the German Cross in Gold (Deutsches Kreuz in Gold) on 15 October 1941 and Knight's Cross of the Iron Cross (Ritterkreuz des Eisernen Kreuzes) on 4 February 1942 for 418 combat missions. Stepp briefly as commander of I./StG 5 from 27 January 1942. On 23 June 1942 Stepp became permanent commanding officer. On 2 March 1943 Stepp was ordered to Rechlin and appointed head of the Versuchskommando für Panzerbekämpfung (Experimental Detachment for Anti-tank Warfare). On 18 May 1943 Stepp was sent to StG 1 and 17 June took command of II./StG 2 with the rank of Major.

=== Wing Commander ===
Emblem of StG 2 "Immelmann"

On 1 October, Stepp took command of StG 2, thus succeeding Oberst Ernst Kupfer as Geschwaderkommodore (wing commander). 17 days later it was renamed Schlachtgeschwader 2 (SG 2—2nd Assault Wing). On 25 April 1944 he was awarded the 462nd Knight's Cross with Oak Leaves (Ritterkreuz des Eisernen Kreuzes mit Eichenlaub) for flying 800 combat missions. Promoted to Oberstleutnant on 1 May 1944, Stepp was transferred to staff office positions in the Luftwaffen Führungsstab in Berlin in August 1944. In December 1944, he was assigned to the staff of Ulrich Kessler, German air attache in Tokyo. Stepp was due to board U-234 for Japan but he did not travel. By the time of the German surrender in May 1945 he had flown 900 missions. After the war he worked as an attorney.

== Awards ==
- Iron Cross (1939)
  - 2nd Class (1 November 1939)
  - 1st Class (15 June 1940)
- Honour Goblet of the Luftwaffe on 9 September 1941 as Oberleutnant in a Sturzkampfgeschwader
- German Cross in Gold on 15 October 1941 as Oberleutnant in the 7./Sturzkampfgeschwader 2
- Knight's Cross of the Iron Cross with Oak Leaves
  - Knight's Cross on 4 February 1942 as Oberleutnant and Staffelkapitän of the 7. Sturzkampfgeschwader 2 "Immelmann"
  - 462nd Oak Leaves on 25 April 1944 as Oberstleutnant and Geschwaderkommodore of Schlachtgeschwader 2 "Immelmann"

Military offices
Preceded by Major Dr. Ernst Kupfer	Commander of Sturzkampfgeschwader 2; 1 October 1943 – 18 October 1943	Succeeded by Schlachtgeschwader 2
Preceded by Sturzkampfgeschwader 2	Commander of Schlachtgeschwader 2; 18 October 1943 – 30 September 1944	Succeeded by Oberstleutnant Hans-Ulrich Rudel
