= Convoy OA 178 =

Convoy damaged in 1940, causing subsequent convoys to be routed from Scotland

- Part of The Second World War
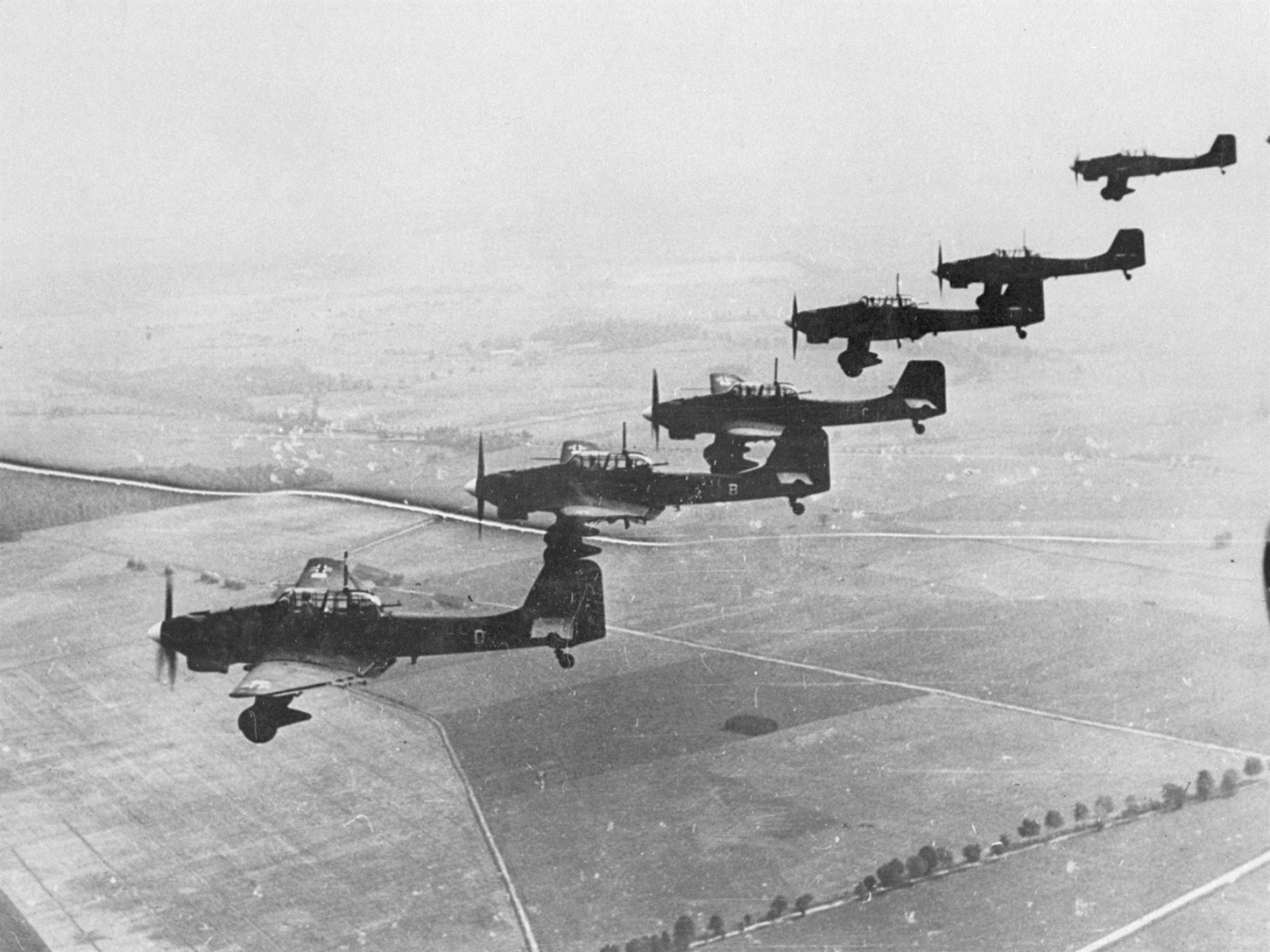
- Formation of Ju 87 Stuka dive-bombers (photographed over Poland in 1939)
Date	3–6 July 1940
Location	English Channel
Result	German victory

Belligerents
(Nazi Germany) Luftwaffe; Kriegsmarine	Royal Navy; Merchant Navy

Commanders and leaders
Johannes Fink; Oskar Dinort; Carl-Heinz Birnbacher	Escort commander: Frederick Jones; Bryan Scurfield; Convoy Commodore: Richard Galer; Vice-convoy Commodore: A. B. Fasting

Strength
26 Junkers Ju 87 Stuka dive-bombers, III./StG 51; 24 Ju 87s of I./StG 2; 4 E-boats (S-boote/1.SFlotille)	1 Corvette; 1 Destroyer; 14 Ocean-going merchant ships; Coasters

Casualties and losses
1 Ju 87 shot down; 2 crew killed; 1 Ju 87 crashed; 2 crew rescued; 1 Bf 109 damaged on landing	5 ships sunk; 11 ships damaged; 5 damaged in harbour

Convoy OA 178 (Outbound Atlantic) was an Atlantic convoy of 14 ocean-going ships and local coasters, comprising 53 ships. The convoy sailed from Southend-on-Sea in the Thames Estuary on 3 July 1940 via the English Channel, where local traffic dispersed to south coast ports. The convoy was dissolved on 6 July 1940 as its surviving ocean-going ships joined convoys to transatlantic destinations. On 4 July, Portland Harbour and the convoy were attacked by Junkers Ju 87 Stuka dive-bombers.

Schnellboote (E-boats to the British) attacked on the remnants of the convoy, during the night of 4/5 July. No support had been forthcoming from RAF Fighter Command and in the aftermath, the Prime Minister, Winston Churchill, was critical of the lack of protection afforded to the convoy. Henceforth OA convoys were routed northabout Scotland but local Coastal East and Coastal West coal convoys continued and suffered more attacks from the combination of Stukas and E-Boats (S-boote).

== Background ==
=== Luftwaffe anti-shipping operations ===
Luftwaffe attacks on shipping were made much easier by the capture of bases in France and the Low Countries. In the North Sea, the Grimsby fishing fleet had been attacked twice in June. Air attacks increased and in July, ship losses off the east coast exceeded those by naval mines. Attacks on minesweepers, escort vessels and anti-invasion patrols rapidly increased and was made worse by a lack of light anti-aircraft guns and the concentration of the air defence effort in the south-east of England against an invasion.

The Admiralty reserved the right for ships to fire on aircraft on an apparently attacking course, because it had been found that a high volume of prompt, accurate fire could reduce the accuracy of bombing and sometimes shoot down the attacker.Hurried training and lack of experience in aircraft recognition among navy crews led to many RAF aircraft being taken for hostile and fired on, even when flying convoy patrols for the ships. The Admiralty demanded close escort from the Royal Air Force (RAF) but required ships to engage unidentified aircraft within 1,500 yd (1,400 m), a practice the RAF considered irresponsible. More training in aircraft recognition and pilots not flying towards ships on tracks similar to bombing runs were obvious remedies and with experience, navy gunners made fewer mistakes.

=== Convoy OA 177G ===
Map of the Kent coast

OA convoys (Outbound Atlantic) from the Thames Estuary were ships convoyed westwards to the Western Approaches whence they joined convoys to their destinations. OA convoys incorporated coasters from the Thames to Southampton, Poole, Plymouth, Fowey and Falmouth along the south coast. The convoys continued to sail the route after the Fall of France on 22 June 1940. On 1 July twenty ships of Convoy OA 177G sailed from Southend-on-Sea. On the morning of 2 July, Junkers Ju 87 (Ju 87) Stuka dive bombers attacked the 10,058 gross register ton (GRT) SS Aeneas and sank it off Start Point, near Dartmouth, with 21 men killed and nine wounded.

The survivors were rescued by the destroyer HMS Witherington and disembarked in Portsmouth. SS Baron Ruthven, was damaged by a near-miss, the captain and chief officer being killed by machine-gun fire and three men wounded by bomb splinters. Most of the coasters left the convoy for local ports before another ten ocean-going ships joined the convoy from Plymouth and Falmouth. Eighteen ships joined when it merged with an OB convoy from Liverpool on 2 July. Some of the ships turned away for Bilbao, Lisbon and Casablanca; only two ships remained when the convoy reached the Atlantic dispersal point.

== Prelude ==
=== Channel convoys ===
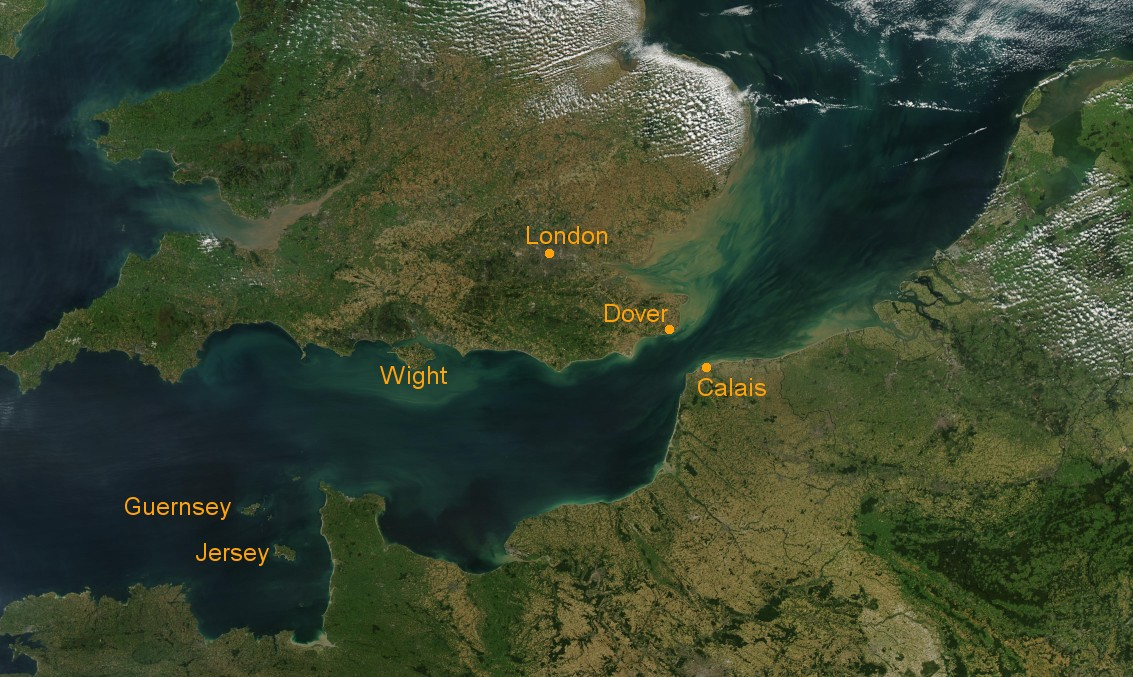
Satellite photograph of the English Channel

Convoy OA 178 assembled off Southend-on-Sea; the convoy commander was Lieutenant-Commander Frederick Jones in the only escort vessel, the Flower-class corvette HMS Clarkia. The convoy commodore was Richard Galer, embarked in SS Peterton and the vice commodore, Commander A. B. Fasting sailed in Saluta. The convoy, comprising 14 ocean-going merchant ships and local colliers, departed on the night of 3/4 July, over-flown by German aircraft heading inland. The convoy passed the Straits of Dover and by dawn, the captain of Hartlepool, W. J. Rogerson, saw the Isle of Wight in the distance,

With that I went out of the Chart Room door and without the need for binoculars I saw the whole of Cap la Hague, the French coast and also the Channel Islands. It was exceedingly clear, visibility being about fourteen miles.

German radar was tracking the convoy, German aircraft again began to pass by.

=== Kanalkampfführer ===
On 4 Jul, a special Luftwaffe anti-shipping force had been assembled to attack convoys and bait RAF fighters, to determine their speed of reaction and to destroy them. Kampfgeschwader 2 flew Dornier Do 17s and Luftflotte 2 contributed IV (Stuka)./Lehrgeschwader 1 (4th Wing LG 1, Demonstration Group 1) with fighter escorts from Erprobungsgruppe 210 with Messerschmitt Bf 110s and Messerschmitt Bf 109s of I and III./Jagdgeschwader 51 and from Luftflotte 3 came the Junkers Ju 87s of II/Sturzkampfgeschwader 1. The new force was commanded by Oberst (Colonel) Johannes Fink, the Geschwaderkommodore of KG 2 who was appointed the Kanalkampfführer (Channel Battle Leader). A Junkers Ju 88 of 1.(Fernaufklärungsgruppe)/123 (1.(F)/123, 1 Staffel (Squadron) Long Range Reconnaissance Wing 123) sent to observe the convoy, reported that it was south-west of Portland in Dorset.

== 4 July ==
=== Portland harbour ===
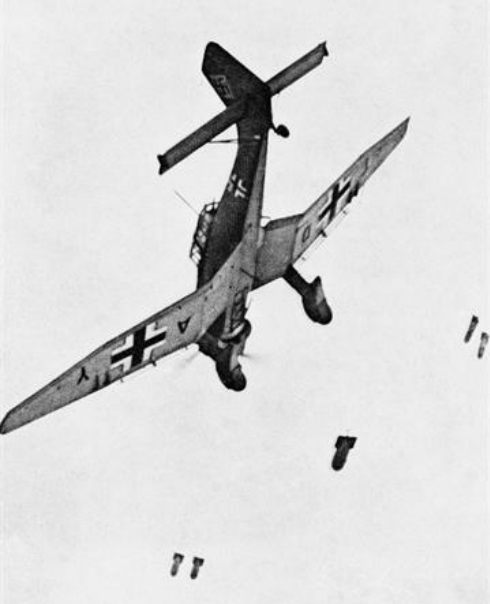
Example of a Ju 87 dive-bombing

At 8:41 a.m. 33 Ju 87 Stuka dive bombers of III./StG 51 attacked Portland, escorted by Bf 110 heavy fighters (destroyers) of V./(Zerstörer) LG 1 and two Staffeln of Bf 109s from 1./LG1. The auxiliary anti-aircraft ship HMS Foylebank (Captain H. P. Wilson Rtd) had been commissioned on 6 June 1940 and carried four twin high-angle 4-inch turrets, two quadruple 2-pounder pom-pom guns and several Vickers .50 machine guns. Foylebank had been based at the harbour for anti-aircraft defence since 9 June. When the Stukas bombed, they dived at angles of up to 90° towards the stern of the ship; at 1,500 ft (460 m) the dive-bomber eased to 45°, the pilot aligning the gun sight on the stern of the ship and opening fire, the bullets moving forwards from the stern to the stem of the ship. The pilot released the bombs as he saw the machine-gun fire pass beyond the bows and hit the water. The pilot had also set the altimeter to the local altitude above mean sea level and a siren blared to warn him to bomb and begin to pull out of the dive. As the Stuka recovered from its dive, the rear-gunner opened fire to keep heads down; the raid took four minutes.

As gunners were running along the decks of Foylebank to reach their action stations, many where hit by bullets or caught by bomb blasts. Two sailors ran for their action station at X gun and a bomb blew one of them across the canteen, wounded and dead lying everywhere. The two sailors headed aft along the port side of the ship towards X gun, a bomb fell down the funnel which blew open the side of the ship facing the docks and they had to turn around. At the rear of the ship the sailors passed through the sick bay for a ladder to the deck but a bomb hit the sick bay, killing everyone there and the second sailor, lower on the ladder. The survivor got on deck to find that his gun had been hit and the crew dead or wounded. The sailor saw other crewmembers firing a pom-pom, matting around it on fire. An officer ordered him forward as the ship was going to be abandoned and he jumped 10 ft (3.0 m), damaging his back, although he was unaware of this for several hours. At the pom-pom guns on the starboard side a pile of bodies blocked the way and he had to clamber through them. A petty officer called out that "Mantle's still firing and when he's finished we'll have to get him down".

Acting leading seaman Jack Mantle had been severely wounded in the left leg by a bomb explosion but continued to operate his pom-pom gun, despite it being damaged, hitting a Stuka, which also hit him with machine-gun fire. Mantle was helped away from the gun as the ship was about to be abandoned. The Stukas dropped 104 250 kg (550 lb) and 50 kg (110 lb) bombs, many of which hit the ship and others near-missed. Some of the gunners on Foylebank managed to fire sixty shells from Y turret. Civilians had sailed their craft over to Foylebank and received the survivors as they slid down ropes from the fo'c'sle, taking the men to Boscawen, where sixty men were found to have been killed, many more later dying of wounds, including Mantle. (Note: Mantle was awarded a posthumous Victoria Cross.) The German fighters circled overhead but no RAF fighters appeared, the only RAF aircraft in the area being a Fairey Battle bomber from RAF Warmwell on a training sortie near Chesil Beach. When the pilot saw the raid, he dived for home at full speed. Two Stukas of 7./StG51 were shot down by ground fire, one into the Channel off Portland, the crew being killed and the other Stuka alighted at Cherbourg with damage; a Bf 109 crashed on landing at Théville near Cherbourg. The tug Silverdial was also sunk and the steamers SS City of Melbourne, SS East Wales and MV William Wilberforce were damaged by bombs in Portland Harbour.

=== Off Portland ===
Soon after the bombing of Portland harbour, 24 Ju 87s of I./StG 2 from Falaise, escorted by a Staffel of I./JG 1 Bf 109s took off, followed by 23 Ju 87 (Stukas) of III./Sturzkampfgeschwader 51 (StG 51) as soon as they had refuelled and rearmed. At about 1:00 p.m. the Stukas attacked in waves of six aircraft, the attack lasting for about an hour. The master of Flimstone watched the Stukas pull out of their dives at 300–250 ft (91–76 m) and the bombs fall close astern, shaking the ship. The attack lasted for about two hours, Clarkia engaging the Stukas with its 4-inch gun and four machine-guns. The chief officer of Deucalion wrote later that the sky seemed full of aircraft that hit the ship with nine bombs and it began to sink. The captain and the carpenter were seriously wounded by machine-gun fire and as soon as a lull occurred, the crew abandoned ship.

The gunner on Dallas City fired at the Stukas as they began to pull out of their dives, their machine-gun fire hitting the ship around him. Three bombs hit Dallas City, one through the skylight to the engine room, one down the funnel and one into number 3 hold, two crew being wounded. Flimstone, already damaged, tried to avoid Dallas City by increasing speed and putting the helm hard to starboard but was hit on the port side by Dallas City, that smashed a lifeboat. It took Flimstone fifteen minutes to manoeuvre free and set course for Portland. Captain Norman Shalton got the crew of Dallas City into the two lifeboats on the port side and abandoned the ship at about 5:00 p.m. The ship sank at 50°09°N, 02°01′W and the crew was rescued about three hours later by Antonio.

Antonio was machine-gunned and near-missed by German bombers 20 nmi (37 km; 23 mi) south-south-west of Portland Bill; the rudder and propeller shaft stanchions being damaged. The crew had to slow the ship and found it difficult to steer, the ship following an erratic course. Antonio rescued 67 shipwrecked mariners and eventually anchored at Weymouth at 11:00 p.m. The Dutch steamer Deucalion was bombed and sunk 20 nmi (37 km; 23 mi) south-south-west of Portland, 27 survivors being amongst those picked up by Antonio. Britsum, also Dutch, was sunk by a Dornier Do 17 off Selsey at 50°04′N, 01°55′W and the Estonian ship Kolga was bombed by a Ju 88 of 4./KG 51 and sunk at 50°13′N, 02°00′W with the loss of one crewman. The British Fairwater was hit and damaged by bombs at 50°16′N, 02°14′W; Argos Hill, Briarwood and were damaged by bombs off Portland.

Eastmoor was bombed 12 nmi (22 km; 14 mi) off Portland Bill and King Frederick suffered bomb damage at 50°10°N, 02°33′W, Irene Maria was damaged by bombs and two men killed. Flimstone reached Portland Harbour and the rest of the convoy was reduced to a disorganised condition. The convoy commodore, Richard Galer, ordered the remnants of the convoy to run for the shelter of the Portland Harbour defences but these had been attacked that morning. When Convoy OA 178 came into sight of Portland, three merchant ships in the harbour had already been damaged. The confined space of the harbour would have been a death-trap for the forty ships left in the convoy and it was turned away. No RAF Fighter Command aircraft had appeared to protect the convoy and during the evening, Schnellbooten (E-Boats to the British) S 19, S 20, S 24 and S 26 of 1. Schnellbootflotille (Kapitänleutnant Birnbacher in S 24) sailed.

=== Night 4/5 July ===
Map of the English south coast, showing Portland Bill in green

Near midnight, the E-Boat S 19 torpedoed Elmcrest 13 nmi (24 km; 15 mi) south of Portland which took on a list as the crew abandoned ship. The S-boot fired its other torpedo at the starboard side as the lifeboat was being rowed clear; the torpedo passed underneath the lifeboat before hitting the ship and the lifeboat capsized, sixteen men being drowned; survivors were rescued by destroyer HMS Sabre.

Soon afterwards, S 20 (Götz von Mirbach) and S 26 hit the tanker British Corporal with two torpedoes at 50°13′N, 02°35′W. Two crewmen were killed and the ship was abandoned but did not sink and was later towed into port. Hartlepool was torpedoed by S 26 and abandoned,16 nmi (30 km; 18 mi) south-south-west of Portland, apparently in a sinking condition, the survivors being rescued by destroyer HMS Scimitar; the ship was later beached at Weymouth.

=== 5–6 July ===
On 5 July, the convoy was reinforced by the destroyer HMS Broke (Commander Bryan Scurfield) until 6 July, when the surviving ships of Convoy OA 178 dispersed in the Southwest Approaches and joined oceanic convoys.

== Aftermath ==
=== Analysis ===
In 2008, Nick Hewitt wrote that hitherto, 3,404 ships had sailed the Channel with eight losses, which was some explanation for British complacency. In 2013, the historian Andy Saunders wrote that the convoy was too far from the English coast for fighters easily to have protected it when the Stukas attacked. If Fighter Command squadrons had been scrambled from RAF bases they would have not arrived before the raid was over. Saunders called the losses inflicted on Convoy OA 178 a British failure, which showed the Germans that the Royal Navy and the RAF were incapable of protecting Channel convoys. After the convoy, local CE and CW coal convoys proved equally vulnerable to the combination of Stukas and S-boote. The British prime minister, Winston Churchill, issued an Action this Day memo to the Admiralty inquiring about the measures to defend convoys along the south coast, particularly the matter of air cover. The severity of the losses to Convoy OA 178 was such that henceforth OA convoys were assembled at Methil in Fife and sailed northabout Scotland to avoid the English Channel.

=== Casualties ===
One man was killed on the Dutch SS Britsum, One on SS Kolga, two on SS Irene Maria, 176 crewmen were killed on Foylebank, 16 men of SS Elmcrest were killed, one man was killed in SS British Corporal and three on SS Hartlepool. One Stuka crew was shot down and killed by anti-aircraft fire from HMS Foylebank during the attack on Portland Harbour. A Ju 87 crashed, the two crew were rescued and a Bf 109 was damaged on landing.

== Convoy OA 178 ==
Ships in Convoy OA 178
Ship	Year	Flag	GRT	Notes
Aegeon	1919	Greece	5,285	Damaged by air attack 4 July
Alex	1914	Merchant Navy	3,932	
Antonio	1918	Merchant Navy	5,225	Damaged, detached 4 July
Ardanbhan	1929	Merchant Navy	4,980	To Newfoundland
Argos Hill	1921	Merchant Navy	7,178	Damaged, detached to Portland 4 July
Briarwood	1930	Merchant Navy	4,019	Damaged, detached to Weymouth Bay 4 July
British Corporal	1922	Merchant Navy	6,972	Damaged, detached 4 July
British Prince	1935	Merchant Navy	4,879	
Britsum	1929	Netherlands	5,255	4 Jul, sunk by Ju 87s StG 2, 9† beached 54°40′04′′N, 00°47′06′′W
Csarda	1917	Panama	3,882	
Dallas City	1936	Merchant Navy	4,952	Sunk by aircraft 4 July
Deucalion	1914	Netherlands	1,796	Sunk by aircraft 4 July, 27 survivors
Eastmoor	1922	Merchant Navy	5,812	Damaged by aircraft, detached 4 July
Elax	1927	Merchant Navy	7,403	
Elmcrest		Merchant Navy	4,343	Sunk by S-boot S 20 4/5 July, 16 casualties
Elstree Grange	1916	Merchant Navy	6,598	
Eskdalegate	1930	Merchant Navy	4,250	To St John's Newfoundland
Fairwater	1928	Merchant Navy	4,108	Damaged, detached 4 July
Flimston	1925	Merchant Navy	4,674	Damaged, detached to Portland 4 July
Gulhaug	1910	Norway	1,243	To Portsmouth
Harbury	1934	Merchant Navy	5,081	
Harpalyce	1940	Merchant Navy	5,169	
Hartlepool	1932	Merchant Navy	5,500	Damaged, beached Weymouth Bay 4 July
Irene Maria	1922	Merchant Navy	1,862	Damaged, detached 4 July
Jeypore	1920	Merchant Navy	5,318	
Kedoe	1921	Netherlands	3,684	To New Orleans
King Frederick	1920	Merchant Navy	5,106	Damaged by aircraft, beached Weymouth Bay 4 July
Kolga	1912	Estonia	3,529	Sunk 4/5 July by S 19, 1† 29 surv.
Lifland	1920	Denmark	2,254	Damaged, detached 4 July
Peterton	1919	Merchant Navy	5,221	
Saluta	1906	Merchant Navy	6,261	
San Ambrosio	1935	Merchant Navy	7,410	
Standella	1936	Merchant Navy	6,197	
Temple Moat	1928	Merchant Navy	4,427	To Buenos Aires
Trefusis	1918	Merchant Navy	5,299	To St John's Newfoundland

== Escorts ==
Escorts and AA ships
Ship	Flag	Type	Notes
HMS Clarkia	Royal Navy	Flower-class corvette	Escort 3–6 July, joined Convoy HX 53
HMS Broke	Royal Navy	Thornycroft type destroyer leader	Escort 5–6 July, joined Convoy HX 53

== Ship losses in Portland Harbour ==
Ships in harbour
Ship	Year	Flag	GRT	Notes
City of Melbourne	1919	Merchant Navy	6,630	Damaged by near miss from Ju 87 dive-bombers
East Wales	1925	Merchant Navy	4,358	Damaged by Ju 87 dive-bombers
HMS Foylebank	1930	Royal Navy	5.582	Auxiliary anti-aircraft ship, bombed, Ju 87s 4 July, sank 5 July; 176†, 157 surv.
Silverdial		Merchant Navy	55	Tug, sunk by Ju 87 dive-bombers
William Wilberforce	1930	Merchant Navy	5,004	Damaged by Ju 87 dive-bombers
