= Daisy cutter (fuse) =

Type of fuse to detonate an aerial bomb

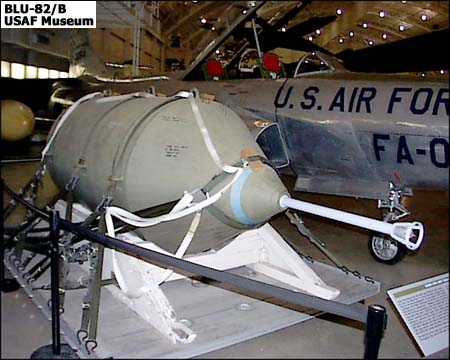
A BLU-82B bomb with a daisy cutter, used by the United States Air Force.

A daisy cutter is a type of fuse designed to detonate an aerial bomb at or above ground level. The fuse itself is a long probe affixed to the weapon's nose, which detonates the bomb if it touches the ground or any solid object in order to maximize blast damage on the surface of a target .

== Purpose ==
The purpose for a daisy-cutter fuse is to maximize blast damage on the surface of a target. A bomb with a conventional fuse will often be driven deeply into the ground by the force of its impact, limiting the range of its blast. A bomb with a daisy-cutter fuse will detonate before it has a chance to penetrate the ground, allowing its energy to spread over a larger area. For this reason daisy-cutter fuses are often used to clear foliage and vegetation, such as for the purpose of creating landing zones for helicopters.

== First mention ==
The first reference to a "daisy-cutter type of bomb" is found in the memoir of Lieutenant Jack Wilkinson in describing the 1918 attack on the Royal Air Force airfield at Bertangles. Wilkinson describes it as a "bomb that seemed to explode before it buried itself in the ground so that bits and pieces flew horizontally in all directions."

=== Extended nose device ===
Oskar Dinort invented an extended-nose fuse device known as the Dinort rod (Dinortstäbe). These were placed on the noses of German World War II-era bombs up to 250 kg (550 lb) in mass, such as the SC 50 and 250 bombs dropped from Junkers Ju 87 (Stuka) dive bombers.

== Concept ==
"Daisy cutter" fuses, when known under that exact name, were used by the United States during the Vietnam War. The concept for the fuse is attributed to an Air America employee who grasped the idea during a night of drinking. Shortly thereafter, his drinking companion, a Royal Lao Air Force airman at Louang Phrabang, gathered the needed materials for the prototype and started welding used aircraft gun barrels directly into the nose fuse cavity of bombs. After the concept proved itself useful it was made famous by being used for the largest conventional bomb in the U.S. military's arsenal at the time, the BLU-82. When used gun barrels were in short supply, water pipes were requisitioned for the task. The welded pipe versions had several adverse effects, such as vibration, pipe weld separation or breakage while in flight, and wind drag, due to impossibility of aligning the pipes correctly with the nose of the weapon, so that phase of development eventually gave way to threaded steel water pipes screwed into the nose cavity of the bombs, leaving only the tail fuse for detonation. After the war more precise fuses were created for this purpose.

These weapons were used in the "shock and awe" phase of the Iraq War and against Al-Qaeda in Afghanistan.
