= Schlachtgeschwader 2 =

- Active: 1943–45
- Country: Nazi Germany
- Branch: Luftwaffe
- Type: Dive bomber
- Role: Close air support
- Size: Air Force Wing
- Nickname: Immelmann
- Patron: Max Immelmann

Commanders
- Notable commanders: Hans-Ulrich Rudel

Insignia
- Identification symbol: T6

Aircraft flown
- Attack: Ju 87, Fw 190

Schlachtgeschwader 2 (SG 2) Immelmann was a Luftwaffe dive-bomber wing of World War II. It was named after Max Immelmann, the first German pilot to earn the Pour le Mérite.

This close-support Stuka unit fought principally in the southern sector of the Eastern Front in places like Stalingrad and the Caucasus. The early two Schlachtgeschwader 1 and 2 were abbreviated SchlG, the reformed Stukageschwader in 1943 were abbreviated SG. The 4 SchlG Gruppen were integrated into the former Stuka (StG) and Schnellkampfgeschwader (SKG) to form SG 2, 4, 77 and 10.

== History ==
Schlachtgeschwader 2 "Immelmann" was formed on 18 October 1943 from Sturzkampfgeschwader 2. I./SG 2 was I./StG 2, II./SG 2 was created from the II./Schlachtgeschwader 1, III./SG 2 was II./StG 2.

In 1941, Stukageschwader 2 was transferred to the Eastern Front. On 26 June 1941, Stuka Geschwader 2 attacked 60 Soviet tanks south of Grodno, and later discovered that only one T-34 had been knocked out. During the rest of 1941 and 1942, the inadequacy of dive-bombing tanks became more evident. The most effective way to assault tanks from the air would appear with SG 2 in 1943.

On 23 September 1941, StG 2 attacked the Baltic Red Banner Fleet docked in Kronstadt harbour. During the attack, Oblt. Rudel crippled the soviet Battleship Marat with a 1000 kg bomb.

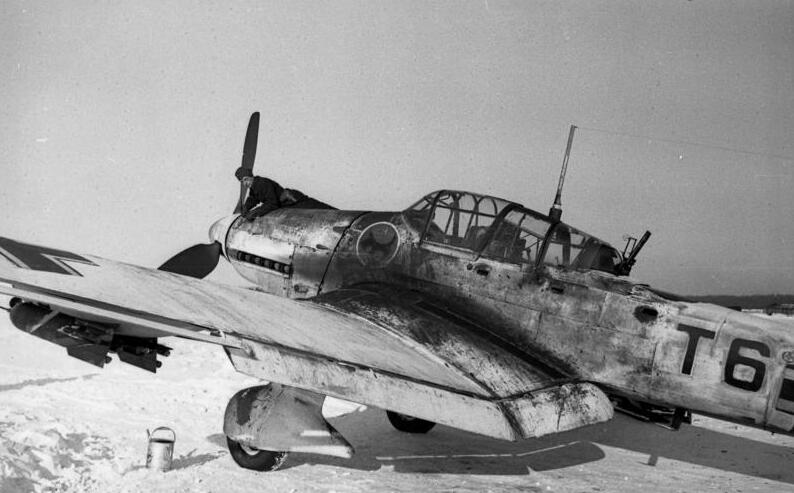
Ju 87 of SG 2 in Russia, January 1942

In late 1942, a Panzerjäger Staffel was formed within StG 2, which enjoyed such success that, after October 1943, a similar unit was added to each Stuka Geschwader. During the spring of 1943 SG 2 worked up with modified Ju 87 G-1 'tank-busters' armed with two Rheinmetall-Borsig 37mm Flak 18 guns mounted under each wing. Prototypes were first used against Russian landing craft in the Black Sea area. In March 1943 Rudel knocked out the first tank with the new Stuka. The Ju 87 G-2, based on the Ju 87 D-5 with extended wingtips, replaced the Ju 87 G-1 during 1944. This was a dedicated tank-buster, with no secondary dive-bombing role.

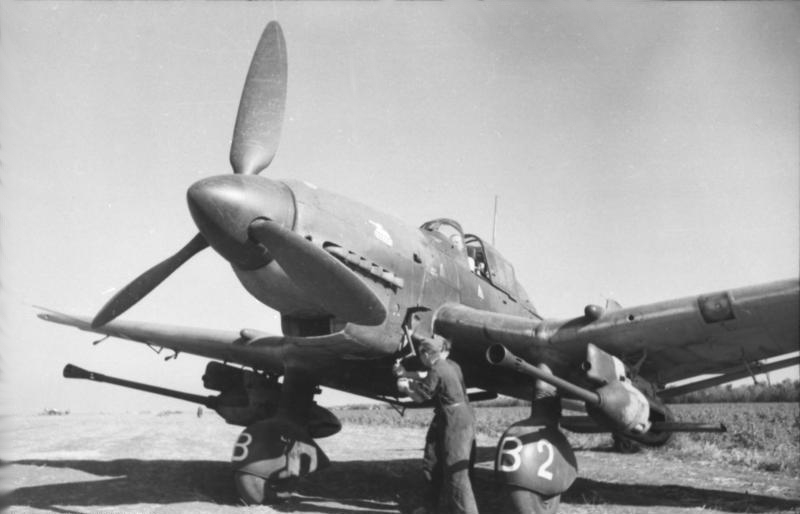
Ju 87 G-2 "Kanonenvogel" with its twin Bordkanone BK 3.7, 37 mm guns.

While II./SG 2, formerly II./SchlG 1, had been equipped with Focke-Wulf Fw 190 since late 1942, I./SG 2 was converted to the new machine in June 1944. III./SG 2 kept on flying the outdated Junkers Ju 87 until the end of World War II. By early 1944 II./SG 2 was covering the gradual Wehrmacht withdrawal around Kirovograd with II./JG 52.

As one of only two Fw 190 equipped ground-attack unit on the Eastern Front, II./SG 2 took part in the 6-month Crimean campaign during 1944, and in addition to its usual ground-attack work flew numerous interception sorties, claiming some 247 Soviet aircraft shot down. By May 1944 the depleted II./SG 2 withdrew to Romania.

By April 1945 Stab and II./SG 2 were based at Kummer, in northern Bohemia, while I./SG 2 was in Austria, and III./SG 2 near Prague.

At the end of the war, the commanding officer and a few other pilots flew their aircraft west and surrendered to the American forces. The transport column traveling on roads was destroyed.

== Commanding officers ==
- Oberstleutnant Hans-Karl Stepp, 18 October 1943 – 30 September 1944
- Oberstleutnant Hans-Ulrich Rudel, 1 October 1944 – 8 February 1945
- Major Friedrich Lang (acting), 9 February 1945 – 13 March 1945
- Oberstleutnant Kurt Kuhlmey (acting), 14 March 1945 – 20 April 1945
- Oberst Hans-Ulrich Rudel, April 1945 – 8 May 1945

== Bibliography ==
- Arthy, Andrew (October 2021). "Last Days of the Cannon Birds: Luftwaffe Junkers Ju 87G Anti-tank Operations, Eastern Front, April-May 1945". The Aviation Historian (37): 20–28. ISSN 2051-1930.
- Bergström, Christer; Mikhailov, Andrey (2001). Black Cross / Red Star—The Air War Over the Eastern Front, Volume II, Resurgence January–June 1942. Pacifica Military History. ISBN 978-0-935553-51-2.
- Bergström, Christer (2007c). Kursk - The Air Battle: July 1943. London: Chevron/Ian Allan. ISBN 978-1-903223-88-8.
- Bergström, Christer (2008). Bagration to Berlin - The Final Air Battles in the East: 1944 - 1945. London: Ian Allan. ISBN 978-1-903223-91-8..
- Brütting, Georg (1992) [1976]. Das waren die deutschen Stuka-Asse 1939 – 1945 [These were the German Stuka Aces 1939 – 1945] (in German) (7th ed.). Stuttgart, Germany: Motorbuch. ISBN 978-3-87943-433-6.
- de Zeng, H.L.; Stankey, D.G.; Creek, E.J. (2007). Bomber Units of the Luftwaffe 1933–1945; A Reference Source, Volume 1. Ian Allan Publishing. ISBN 978-1-85780-279-5.
- de Zeng, H.L.; Stankey, D.G.; Creek, E.J. (2009). Dive-Bomber and Ground-Attack Units of the Luftwaffe, 1933–1945: A Reference Source, Vol. 1. Ian Allan Publishing. ISBN 978-1-9065-3708-1.
- Hooton, E.R. (1994). Phoenix Triumphant; The Rise and Rise of the Luftwaffe. London: Arms & Armour Press. ISBN 978-1-85409-181-9.
- Muller, Richard (1992). The German Air War in Russia, 1941-1945. Baltimore: The Nautical & Aviation Publishing Company of America. ISBN 1-877853-13-5.
