= Sturzkampfgeschwader 2 =

Luftwaffe dive bomber wing during World War II

- Active: 1 May 1939 – 18 October 1943
- Country: Nazi Germany
- Allegiance: Axis powers
- Branch: Luftwaffe
- Type: Dive bomber
- Role: Close air support Offensive counter air Anti-tank warfare Air interdiction Maritime interdiction
- Size: Air force wing
- Nickname: Immelmann
- Patron: Max Immelmann
- Engagements: World War II

Commanders
- Notable commanders: Oskar Dinort; Dr. Ernst Kupfer; Paul-Werner Hozzel; Hans-Karl Stepp

Insignia
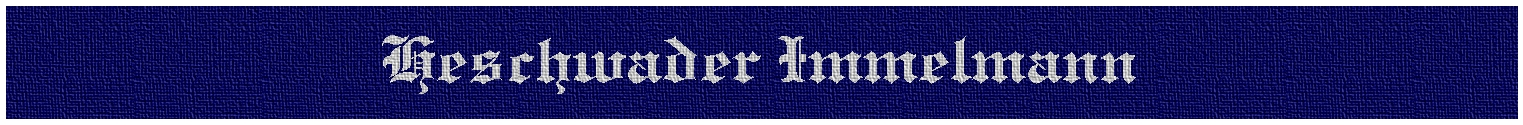
- Cuff title
- Identification symbol: T6 (became SG 2 in 1943)

Sturzkampfgeschwader 2 (StG 2) Immelmann was a Luftwaffe dive bombing wing of World War II. It was named after the World War I aviator Max Immelmann. It served until its dissolution in October 1943. The wing operated the Junkers Ju 87 Stuka exclusively.

Formed on 1 May 1939, StG 2 fought in the German Invasion of Poland in September 1939 which started World War II. It formed part of Luftflotte 2 in May and June 1940 and supported Army Group A in the Battle of Belgium and Battle of France. StG 2 remained with Luftflotte 2 during the Battle of Britain, before transferring to southern Europe to participate in the Battle of the Mediterranean.

In the south it mainly conducted maritime interdiction as it bombarded Malta from January to March 1941. The wing then fought in the German invasion of Yugoslavia and Battle of Crete in April 1941 in maritime, air interdiction, counter-air and close air support alongside StG 1, StG 3 and StG 77. The Ju 87 groups were successful in the Battle of Crete, the final phase of the Greek campaign.

Elements of the wing fought in the North African Campaign until January 1942. The bulk of StG 2 fought on the Eastern Front from 22 June 1941, when Operation Barbarossa, the invasion of the Soviet Union began. It fought in support of all three army groups, and served in battles such as the Siege of Leningrad, the Battle of Moscow and the Battle of Stalingrad in 1941 and 1942.

StG 2 supported German forces in the Battle of Kursk, the last big German offensive on the Eastern Front in July 1943. The vulnerability of the Ju 87 and the loss of air superiority to the Red Air Force, precluded any further mass use of the aircraft as a dive-bomber. In October 1943, the Ju 87 units were renamed Schlachtgeschwader, battle wings, with Ju 87s and Focke-Wulf Fw 190s operating as anti-tank aircraft.

Stab., I., and III./StG 2 was renamed Schlachtgeschwader 2 on the 18 October 1943 and ceased to exist. II./StG 2 continued, with the same name, to operate until January 1944, when its staffeln (squadrons) were renamed and equipped.

== Background ==
The dive-bomber is often associated with German aerial development in the pre-war era, but the type remained a low-priority for air planners who shaped the embryonic Luftwaffe. This apparent regression from the practices and experiences of World War I stemmed from the belief among the General Staff (Oberkommando der Luftwaffe) that army support aviation in 1917–1918 was purely a reaction to trench warfare.

German air doctrine remained rooted in the fundamentals of Operativer Luftkrieg (Operational Air War) which stressed interdiction, strategic bombing (when and if possible) but primarily the air supremacy mission. The Spanish Civil War experience encouraged the General Staff to embrace the dive-bomber concept later in the 1930s, though the war's influence on German operational preferences remain ambiguous.

On the eve of World War II, some German air planners regarded the dive-bomber as a strategic weapon to strike with precision at enemy industry. Even factored into the army support groups, only fifteen percent of Luftwaffe front-line strength contained specialist ground-attack aircraft in September 1939. The lack of specialist close support aircraft left the general-purpose dive-bomber, the Junkers Ju 87 Stuka, most suited to the close support role.

=== Formation ===
Sturzkampfgeschwader 2 was formed on 1 May 1939 upon the establishment of all three Gruppen. The Stabsstaffel (command unit) was formed at Köln–Ostheim on 15 October 1939. The Stab unit was predominantly equipped with Dornier Do 17 aircraft and a handful of Ju 87s for reconnaissance and personnel transport purposes. The Gruppen were equipped with the Ju 87 dive bomber.

The wing's first commanding officer was Oskar Dinort. I./StG 2 was established in Breslau from I./StG 163. II./StG 2 in Stolp-Reitz, present day Słupsk-Redzikowo Airport in Poland, from I./StG 162, and III./StG 2 from III./StG 163 in Langensalza. Dinort led the wing and first Gruppe upon StG 2's creation. Dinort then relinquished command of I./StG 2 for control of Stab./StG 2. Hauptmann Ulrich Schmidt and Ernst Ott commanded the first and second Gruppen. Hauptmann Hubertus Hitschhold succeeded Dinort mid-way through StG's first major campaign.

In August 1939 Dinort moved I./StG 2 to Nieder-Ellguth under the Fliegerdivision 2 (Flying Division 2) subordinated to Luftflotte 4 (Air Fleet 4). 38 Ju 87s were available to Dinort, only one was non-operational. An additional three Dornier Do 17P reconnaissance aircraft were operational. Ulrich Schmidt commanded 38 Ju 87s, all but two operational with three Do 17P aircraft. Based at Stolp-Reitz, Schmidt was subordinated to Fliegerdivision 1 (Flying Division) and Luftflotte 1 (Air Fleet 1). III./StG 2 was assigned the same division and air fleet with second Gruppe. 34 of 36 Ju 87s and the three Do 17Ps were available at Stolp-West, near Annafeld and Danzig by 1 September 1939.

== World War II ==
=== Poland ===
On 1 September 1939 the German Wehrmacht began the invasion of Poland followed sixteen days later by the Soviet invasion of Poland. Luftflotte 4 supported the 14th Army attacking out of Slovak Republic. Luftflotte 4's bombers dropped 389 tons of bombs on 1 September, 200 on Kraków in 1,200 sorties. Leutnant Frank Neubert and Unteroffizier Frank Kilnger from 1 Staffel are believed to have claimed the first aerial victory of the war against a PZL P.11. Captain Mieczysław Medwecki, 121 Squadron, Polish Air Force, was taking off from Balice airfield.

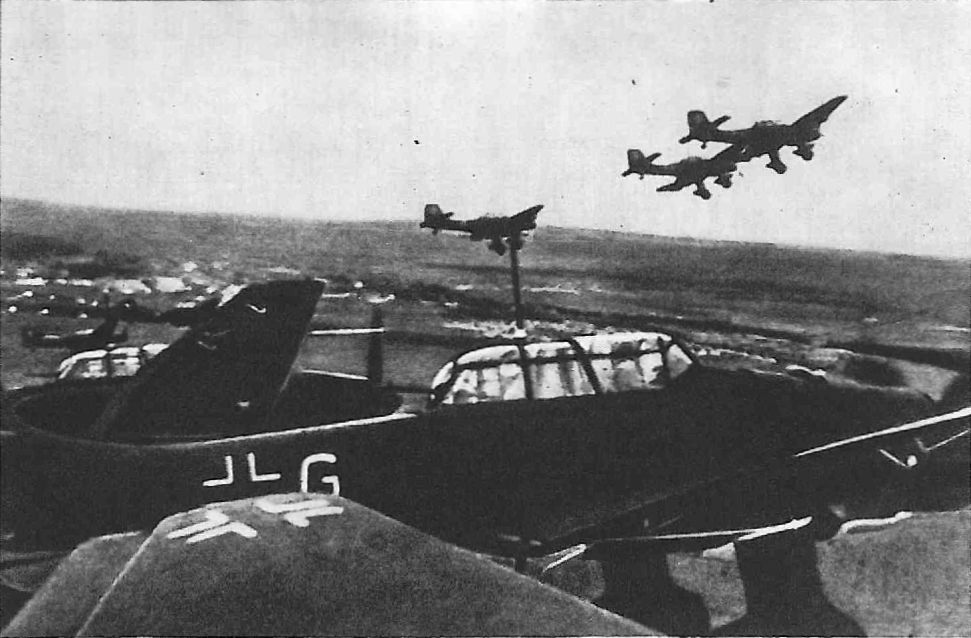
A Staffel of Ju 87s in formation, 1939

Dinort led his Gruppe into action against airfields at Kraków and Katowice. Later in the morning Dinort led the group in the bombing of Wieluń, ostensibly to destroy a Polish Army cavalry unit reported in the town. German intelligence was wrong and Polish sources assert no Polish military unit was present. Dinort's I./StG 2 attacked the roads in the town; the bombing caused many civilian fatalities. Schmidt and Ulrich's Gruppen attacked other targets and were not involved. Schmidt was replaced by Hauptmann Claus Hinkelbein from 10 September. Counter air operations against the Polish Air Force failed since the Polish fighter force dispersed and succeeding in getting airborne. Along with elements of StG 77, I./StG 2 claimed the destruction of the Wołyńska Cavalry Brigade at the Battle of Mokra. Though it sustained 20 percent casualties the brigade was far from destroyed. On 3 September the Ju 87 groups under Richthofen's command contributed to the destruction of 7th Polish Division.

Army Group North's operations were supported by the other Gruppen. The Polish Corridor and its elimination were the initial priority for the 4th Army, supported by Luftflotte 1. The targets were harbours, roads and bridges in the Danzig. III./StG 2 supported the Battle of Westerplatte and Battle of Danzig Bay. second and third group supported attacks on the Polish Navy, after ineffective assaults by the Kriegsmarine.

II./StG 2 fought in the Battle of Radom until 9 September but little of its further service in Poland is known. I. and III./StG 2 assisted in the destruction of the Prusy Army at Radom. Two gruppen moved south toward I./StG 2. I. and III./StG 2 fought in the Battle of the Bzura. III./StG 2 attacked road and troop concentrations in the Battle of Lwów. From 2–6 September I./StG 2 repeatedly attacked Piotrków Trybunalski rail station inflicting heavy casualties on detraining Polish infantry forces in the Battle of Piotrków Trybunalski. The 40 Ju 87s comprised elements of I./StG 2 and StG 76. Of the three gruppen, III./StG 2 is known to have taken part in the siege of Warsaw. First gruppe fought in the Battle of Modlin as Polish resistance collapsed.

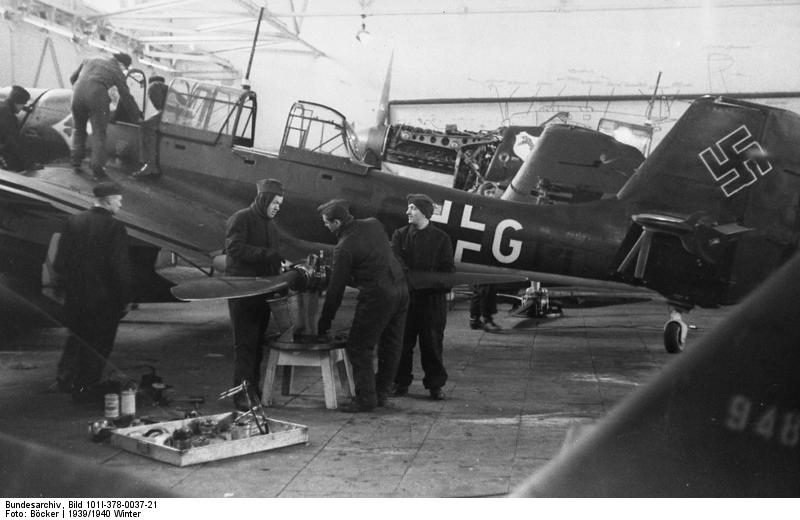
StG 2 Ju 87s under maintenance, 1939/40. The Ju 87 in the foreground carries the emblem of 4 staffel. The aircraft in the background appears to be from 5 staffel.

The Polish campaign ended on 6 October 1939. On 15 October the Stabstaffel was formed and Dinort assumed command. Hubertus Hitschhold took command of first Gruppe. Dinort's small command unit mustered three Ju 87s [which could attach themselves to any staffel or gruppe] and six Do 17 M reconnaissance aircraft. I./StG 76 was assigned to Stab./StG 2 in the winter, a practice common in the Luftwaffe. I./StG 2 located to Cologne in October under Fliegerkorps VIII. During the Phoney War I./StG 2 trained at Hildesheim on attacking Belgian Army fortresses. In January the gruppe located to Marburg. II./StG 2 spent the period near Cologne; little is known about its activity over the winter. III./StG 2's activities mirrored first gruppe. II./StG 2 commanding officer Hinkelbein was replaced with Major Georg Fritze on 27 October and then on 16 December Walter Enneccerus took command.

=== Western Europe ===
Stab., I. and III./StG 2 were placed under the control of Fliegerkorps VIII, subordinated to Kesselring's Luftflotte 2 initially. Stab. gained I./StG 76 but lost II./StG 2 which was placed under the command of Stab./StG 3 subordinated to Luftflotte 3 commanded by Hugo Sperrle. Hitschhold had 40 aircraft with 33 operational. Enneccerus was given 38 Ju 87s with 33 serviceable under StG 3 commodore Karl Angerstein. Major Clemens Graf von Schönborn-Wiesentheid took command of III./StG 2 on 15 April 1940 from Ott. Only 27 of the 38 machines assigned to him were combat ready. Despite the condition of the gruppe, all units were committed to Fall Gelb.

Cologne hosted stab. and I./StG 2 at the beginning of the offensive. Nörvenich was home to III./StG 2. All of them were under the control of Richthofen. II./StG 2 located to Siegburg under von Griem's Fliegerkorps V. Hitschhold's gruppe were involved in the counter air campaign during the invasion of Belgium on 10 May 1940. A dive bombing attack at Brustem airfield destroyed nine Belgian Air Force Fiat CR.42 fighters of the 15. Belgian air defences were rendered useless.

Dinort's StG 2 played a crucial role in supporting the Battle of Fort Eben-Emael by preventing Belgian reinforcements from counterattacking German paratroopers. III./StG 2 and I./StG 77, with elements of LG 2 assisted with the fort's capture though the position remained under heavy Belgian fire. Hitschhold lost five Ju 87s attacking forts at Namur and Liège on 11 May to Royal Air Force fighter. III./StG 2 fought in the battles and engaged in combat operations during the Battle of the Netherlands at the Battle of Maastricht. Road traffic at Tirlemont and Antwerp on 11 May. It aided the crossing of the Oise in the initial days. 11 Ju 87s from I. and II./StG 2 were lost to 3, 87 and No. 607 Squadron RAF, despite fighter protection from Jagdgeschwader 27 during 11 May. Third gruppe lost four aircraft to French Curtiss P-36 Hawks on the 11 May and supported the battles at Gembloux by attacking French armour suffering a solitary casualty to RAF fighters on 12 May. Another was lost on 14 and 15 May at Gembloux. I./StG 76, under Dinort's direct command, with Otto Weiß's II.(S)/LG 2, supported XVI Army Corps commanded by Erich Hoepner. During the course of the Battle of Hannut, and Battle of Gembloux Gap I./StG 76 lost seven Ju 87s to anti-aircraft defences. Some of Weiß's pilots flew eight sorties. Hitschhold's gruppe was engaged in support of the battles. StG 2 remained supporting the 6th Army against the K-W Line to the 12/13 May.

Thereafter, StG 2 turned to the Battle in France. The wing contributed 200 sorties to the Battle of Sedan, and the breakout to the English Channel. Specifically second group were involved in the battle during the breakout phase on 14 May. StG 2 switched to support the 12th army for two days, south of Namur from 18 May. Over 15–17 May, Hitschhold's group moved to Saint-Quentin, Aisne, then on to Cambrai. III./StG 2 move through southern Belgium to Bastogne by 15 May. Operating from forward airfields, it played a role in the defeat of Charles de Gaulle's 4th Armoured Division at the Battle of Montcornet, on 17–19 May. It bombed the bridges over the Serre and destroyed French transport vehicles with towed artillery pieces. De Gaulle later remarked about III./StG 2's Stukas;

They continued to bomb us until sunset and consequently they destroyed our wheeled vehicles, which were confined to the roads, and our supporting artillery, which had no cover.

The battle of Montcornet and Crécy-sur-Serre effectively destroyed the French Ninth Army. On 18 May the Ju 87s assisted in the defeat of the French 1st Arnoured Division outside St Quentin, and attacked troop trains in Soissons, which blocked the exits from Amiens. Their bombs also defeated a French tank attack at Laon. The gruppe joined II./StG 2 in the Cambrai area at Beaulieu. Both gruppen prepared for operations against the Channel ports from 22 May. Before turning to anti-shipping operations, the third group's notable contribution was the Battle of Arras, and the defeat of a British counterattack. I./StG 2 joined the attacks over Arras.

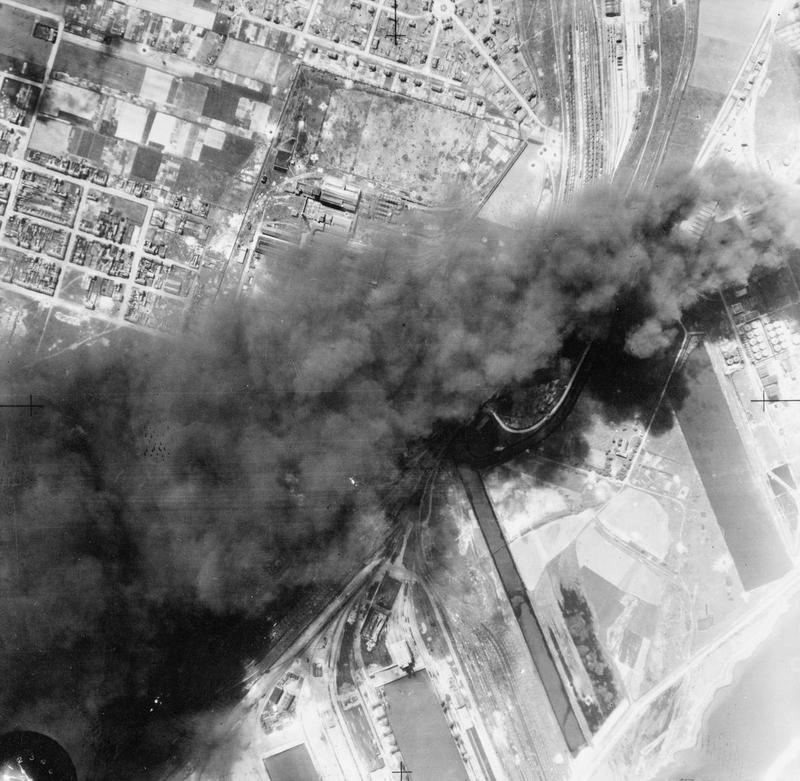
The burning oil tanks at Dunkirk. Bomb craters have scarred the landscape

The Royal Navy began Operation Dynamo to evacuate the British Army. All three gruppen supported the army in its drive to the Channel ports. StG 2 carried out attacks on shipping in the Battle of Boulogne, siege of Calais and then the Battle of Dunkirk. At Boulogne, the French Navy lost Chacal and Fougueux crippled by Ju 87s. Both have been credited to I. and II./StG 2, the former was beached and finished by German artillery. In a major action, Dinort led 39 Ju 87s from gruppen I. and II in an attack on Admiral James Somerville's forces off Calais on 24 May. The 10th Panzer Division requested air support against Royal Navy warships bombarding their positions as the division fought its way into Calais. The light cruisers Arethusa, Galatea, and destroyers Grafton, Greyhound, Verity, Wessex, Wolfhound, Vimiera and Polish Navy destroyer Burza were subjected to an intense dive bombing attack. Wessex was sunk, Vimiera and Burza were damaged. The Ju 87s suffered no loss in their unopposed attacks. Six of the Wessex crew were killed and 15 wounded. The Stukas survived an attack from RAF Fighter Command fighters operating from England without loss. StG 77 and StG 2 were instrumental in eliminating Allied resistance in Calais.

Operations turned to Dunkirk. On 27 May the troopship Côte d' Azur was sunk by StG 2, which also bombed the harbour with 500 and 1,000-pound bombs. KG 2 and KG 3 followed up the attacks. Their bombing runs destroyed the oil tanks and contributed to the inferno. Around 15,000 high explosive and 30,000 incendiary bombs were dropped on Dunkirk by 300 German aircraft. Ju 87s continued to take a heavy toll of shipping; StG 2 and 77 were operating over the evacuation beaches. On 29 May the destroyer Grenade was severely damaged by a Ju 87 attack and subsequently sank. The French destroyer Mistral was crippled by bomb damage the same day. Jaguar and Verity were badly damaged while the trawlers Calvi and Polly Johnson (363 and 290 tons) disintegrated under bombardment. The merchant ship Fenella (2,376 tons) was sunk having taken on 600 soldiers. The attacks brought the evacuation to a halt for a time. The rail ships Lorina and Normannia (1,564 and 1,567 tons) were sunk also.

By 29 May, the Allies had lost 31 vessels sunk and 11 damaged. On 1 June the Ju 87s sank the Skipjack (815 tons) while the destroyer Keith was sunk and Basilisk was crippled before being scuttled by Whitehall. Whitehall was later badly damaged and along with Ivanhoe, staggered back to Dover. Havant, commissioned for just three weeks, was sunk and in the evening the French destroyer Foudroyant sank. On 1 June the steamer Pavon was lost while carrying 1,500 Dutch soldiers most of whom were killed. The oil tanker Niger was also destroyed. A flotilla of French minesweepers were also lost—Denis Papin (264 tons), the Le Moussaillon (380 tons) and Venus (264 tons).

StG 2 played a role in Fall Rot, the final phase of the French campaign. I./StG 2 supported the 9th army as it pushed towards Laon and from the 8 June, the 9th and 6th army over the Seine and Marne. It supported the army in the battles of Péronne, Somme, Amiens, Roye, Chauny, and Nogent and the advances east of Paris over the Yonne and Loire. II./StG 2 protected the 5th Panzer Division in the capture of Rouen and ended the campaign in Beauvais. III./StG 2's operations supported the same advances and ended the campaign in Auxerre. The Armistice of 22 June 1940 curtailed any further moves south. The battles cost I./StG 2 at least 15 aircraft, II./StG 2 13 Ju 87s and III./StG 2 another 10 equating to 38 Ju 87s in total, the vast majority in combat with Allied fighter aircraft.

=== Battle of Britain ===
From 22 June to 10 July 1940 aerial skirmishes occurred over the English Channel between RAF Fighter Command and the Luftwaffe, operating from airfields in German-occupied Belgium and France. The Oberkommando der Wehrmacht was planning for a possible invasion, codenamed Operation Sea Lion. The aerial battles gradually escalated as German operations moved to destroying Channel shipping—termed the Kanalkampf phase—and then Fighter Command defences in what became known as the Battle of Britain. The Oberkommando der Luftwaffe left the two German air fleet commanders, Sperrle and Kesselring to carry out attacks on targets of their choosing in June and early July for there was little direction from the OKL.

On 2 July, German attacks caught convoy OA177G en route for Gibraltar. StG 2 sank the British steamer Aeneas (10,058 gross register tons (GRT)) south-east of Start Point, Devon; 18 crewmen died and the rest were rescued by the destroyer HMS Witherington and later StG 2 damaged the British steamer Baron Ruthven (3,178 GRT). I. and II./StG 2 moved to Laon and Lannion before moving to the Pas-de-Calais and III./StG 2 group moved to Caen. On 4 July 1940 the wing attacked Convoy OA 178 (convoy outbound Atlantic) as it passed through the Channel. 14 merchantmen left the Thames Estuary, bound for the west coast and passed Dover on 3 July. German radar picked up the convoy and the Luftwaffe was ordered to intercept the ships. A Junkers Ju 88 reconnaissance aircraft from 1.(F)/123 flew over the Channel and reported that the convoy was south-west of Portland. I./StG 2 took off, led by Dinort with 24 Ju 87s, escorted by a Staffel of fighters from I./JG 1. The attack was followed by 23 Ju 87s of III./StG 51. The ships were close to the French coast when Dallas City was damaged, engulfed in flames and collided with Flimson which was also hit and the ships took 15 minutes to disengage; Dallas City later sank. Antonio was heavily damaged. Deucalion (1,796 GRT), Kolga (3,526 GRT) and Britsum (5,225 GRT) were sunk and SS Canadian Constructor, was damaged for no German loss.

Convoys "Booty" and "Agent" passed through on 11 July. Dinort's wing attacked shipping along the coast. The Stukas sank HMS Warrior (1,124 GRT) with one casualty. 501 Squadron had scrambled but was engaged by the Bf 109 escort and lost one pilot shot down and drowned; No. 609 Squadron RAF arrived as the Ju 87s began their dives. The six Spitfires split, one section of three engaging the Stukas and the other taking on the escort. Overwhelmed by odds of 6:1, the squadron was routed, with the loss of two pilots killed for no loss to the Germans; none of the merchant vessels were hit. A second attack was ordered. At 11:00 GMT, Hawker Hurricanes from No. 601 Squadron RAF were scrambled to intercept a reconnaissance Do 17, missed it and stumbled into a formation from III./StG 2 escorted by about 40 Messerschmitt Bf 110s, that British radar failed to locate. The escorts were too high above the Ju 87s to stop the first attack. Most squadrons in the Middle Wallop sector were re-fuelling but six 238 Squadron Hurricanes were scrambled, with three more from 501 and 87 Squadrons and nine from 213 Squadron near Exeter. None arrived in time to stop the attack on Portland at 11:53 GMT but little damage was done and only one vessel was damaged. A Ju 87 was destroyed and another force-landed; the light Stuka losses were a result of the Bf 110s bearing the brunt of the fighter attacks. Bf 110 pilot Hans-Joachim Göring, nephew of Hermann Göring, commander in chief of the Luftwaffe was killed protecting the Stukas. The British steamer Kylemount (704 GRT) was damaged off Dartmouth and the steamers Peru (6,961 GRT) and City of Melbourne (6,630 GRT) were damaged in Portland harbour. Eleanor Brooke (1,037 GRT) was damaged off Portland and the Dutch steamer Mies (309 GRT) was damaged south of Portland Bill.

On 29 July a further raid yielded success. At 19:25 III./StG 2 Ju 87s led by Gruppenkommandeur Walter Enneccerus sank the destroyer HMS Delight 13 nautical miles (24 km; 15 mi) off Portland. The ship was crippled and on fire, as the Stukas left the scene unchallenged and the sinking Delight made for the coast off Portland. The destroyers HMS Vansittart and Broke rescued 147 men and 59 wounded but 19 of the crew were killed. The burning vessel remained afloat until 21:30, when there was a large explosion and it sank. The Admiralty withdrew all destroyer flotillas from the Channel and ordered no convoy to sail the Channel in daylight. This order had been given on 26 July before Delight sailed and some sources note that standing orders had been broken.

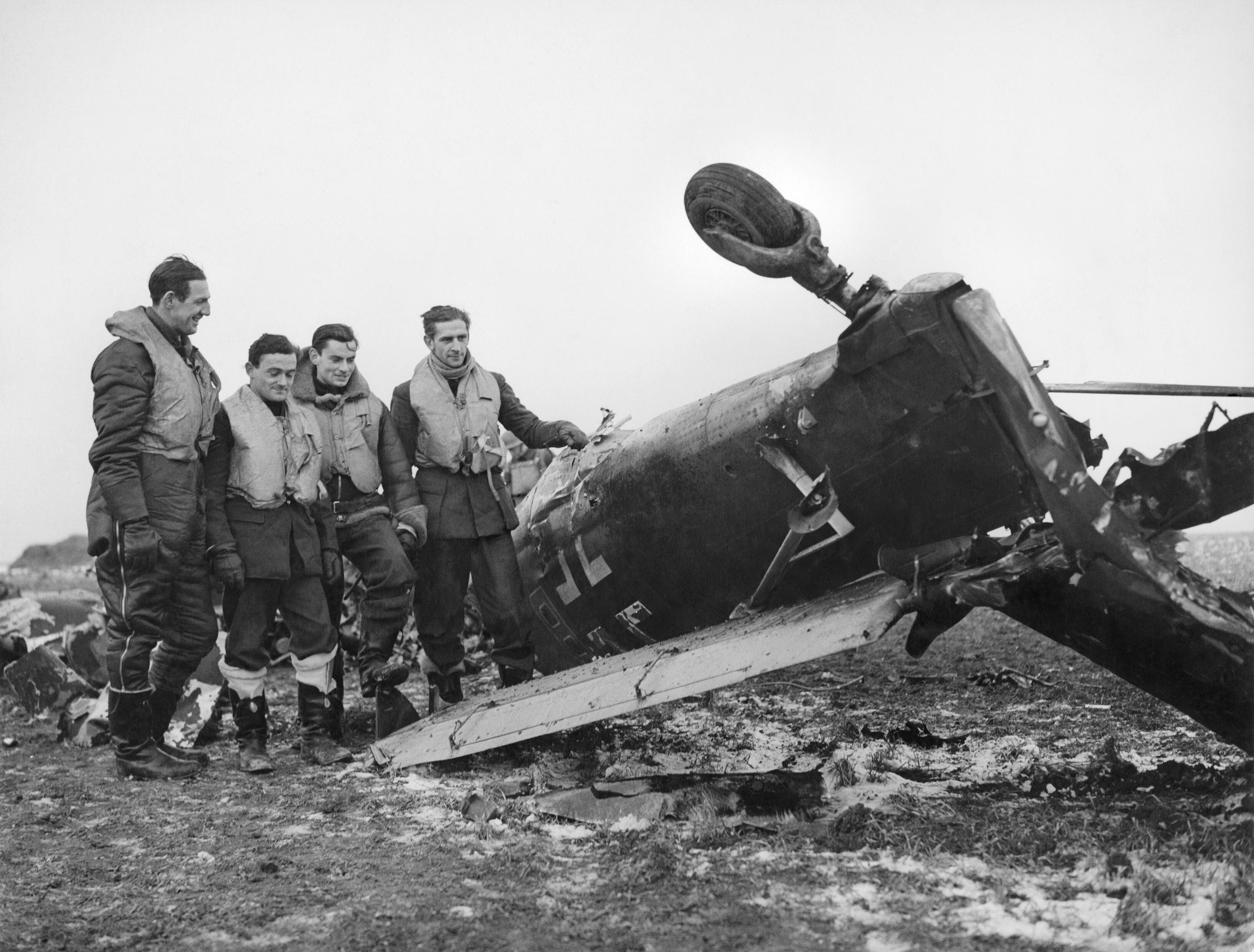
RAF pilots examine a Ju 87, shot down while attacking a convoy.

Across the 7 an 8 August 1940 a large air-sea battle developed around Convoy Peewitt which involved Kriegsmarine E-boats. In the late morning StG 2, 3 and 77 from Angers, Caen and St. Malo were escorted by Bf 110s from V./LG 1, to attack the convoy south of the Isle of Wight, with about 30 Bf 109s from II. and III./JG 27 for high cover. From 12:20, Spitfires of 609 Squadron and Hurricanes from 257 and 145 squadrons attacked the German formations, joined later by 238 Squadron. The Ju 87s severely damaged SS Surte, MV Scheldt and SS Omlandia and sank SS Balmaha soon after. SS Tres was sunk by StG 77. SS Empire Crusader, in the lead, was hit by StG 2 and sank several hours later; four ships were sunk and four were damaged in the attacks. From 20 to 30 RAF fighters attacked the German aircraft and I. and II./StG 2 suffered one damaged Ju 87 each.

On 13 August Adlertag began to destroy Fighter Command. Targets for the day were the Portland area and airfields specifically RAF Middle Wallop and neighbouring radar station and RAF Warmwell. 52 Ju 87s from StG 1 and StG 2 took off RAF Warmwell and Yeovil. I./JG 53 flew a fighter sweep ahead of the bombers from Poole to Lyme Regis in order to tempt the RAF into battle. I./JG 53 made landfall at 16:00. The sweep failed to attract and divert RAF squadrons. Instead, all it succeeded in doing was to alert the RAF defences a critical five minutes earlier. When the main wave of LG 1 and StG 2 arrived over the coast, they were greeted by 77 RAF fighters. II., and III./JG 53 and III./ZG 76 flew escort for the Ju 87s. ZG 2 and JG 27 flew escort for LG 1. In response the whole of No. 10 Group RAF intercepted. One staffel II./StG 2 was badly hit by 609 Squadron; six out of nine Ju 87s were shot down. StG 1 and 2 gave up on their original targets owing to clouds. Both headed for Portland. I./StG 2, with 29 of 35 aircraft operational, was ordered to bomb an airfield near Rochford but abandoned the mission due to bad weather. Enneccerus' II./StG 2 turned back when the formation of 27 was intercepted and promptly lost six Ju 87s [from an operational total off 33 from 39].

Enneccerus and his gruppe were tasked with destroying RAF Hawkinge on 15 August, a date known as "black Thursday" in the Luftwaffe. He lost four Ju 87s in the process. On 16 August StG 2 was involved in a large-scale attack on airfields in southern England. RAF Tangmere was the target. Dinort's wing encountered strong fighter opposition over the target area near Portsmouth. Hitschhold lost five crews and three aircraft damaged from I. gruppe. Brücker's III./StG 2 bombed Tangmere and radar station at Selsey Bill. He lost four aircraft and three damaged. From 16 August 1940 it was non-operational. Two days later, the Stukas suffered a comprehensive defeat in "The Hardest Day" battles and were subsequently withdrawn from air superiority operations. StG 77 lost 22 aircraft destroyed or damaged on that day.

For the Stuka wings spent the rest of their time on the Channel front idle. StG 2 carried out training exercises and occasional "special" missions which amounted to low-level attacks against coastal shipping at dusk. Hitschhold's group provided crews and aircraft for the Karl Ritter propaganda film Stukas with III./StG 2. The film was a box-office hit in Germany. Quartermaster General of the Luftwaffe reported significant losses for StG 2 from 4 July to 18 August 1940. StG 2 lost 25 Ju 87s with five more damaged. 19 were killed in action, four wounded in action and 18 missing in action. I./StG 2 suffered the loss of ten aircraft, four damaged, eight killed, one wounded and five wounded. II./StG 2 lost also lost ten aircraft, seven dead, one wounded, seven missing and two captured. III./StG 2 lost five Stukas and one damaged. Four men were killed, two wounded, six missing. Total Ju 87 losses from 3 July to 24 December 1940 amounted to 101 destroyed, 84 damaged to all causes.

=== Malta and North Africa ===
I. with III./StG 2 moved to Otopeni north of Bucharest, Romania under Richthofen in January 1941 after the cancelation of Operation Felix. II./StG 2 remained with Stab./StG 3. It staged southward to Sicily in December 1940 to interdict shipping between Sicily and Tunisia. Walter Enneccerus and II gruppe began operations supporting the Italian Siege of Malta. The group was in action on 10 January. The British Operation Excess was launched, which included a series of convoy operations by the British across the Mediterranean Sea. On 10 January they were within range of the Ju 87 bases. II./StG 2 sent 43 Ju 87s with support from I./StG 1. Some 10 Ju 87s attacked the carrier HMS Illustrious unopposed. Witnessed by Andrew Cunningham, C-in-C of the Mediterranean Fleet from the battleship HMS Warspite, the Ju 87s scored six hits. One destroyed a gun, another hit near her bow, a third demolished another gun, while two hit the lift, wrecking the aircraft below deck, causing explosions of fuel and ammunition. Another went through the armoured deck and exploded deep inside the ship. Two further attacks were made without result. Badly damaged, but with her main engines still intact, she steered for Malta. Warspite was also damaged. The attack lasted six minutes; killed 126 crew members and wounded 91. Within sight of Malta, Italian torpedo bombers also attacked the carrier, but were driven off by intense anti-aircraft fire. Cunningham remarked of the Stukas;

There was no doubt we were watching complete experts. Formed roughly in a large circle over the fleet, they peeled off one by one when reaching attacking position. We could not but admire the skill and precision of it all. The attacks were pressed home to point-blank range, and as they pulled out of the dives some were seen to fly along the flight deck of the Illustrious below the level of the funnel.

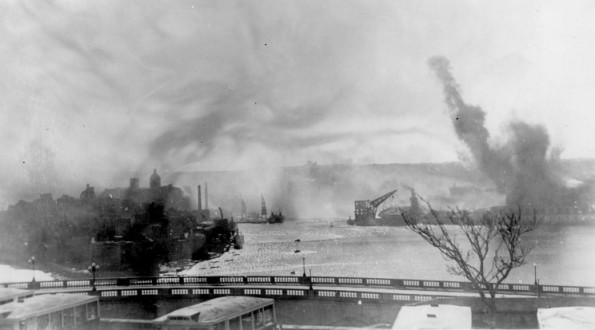
HMS Illustrious under Ju 87 attack in the Grand Harbour. The carrier is to the right of the large crane.

On 11 January 1941, 10 more Ju 87s were sent by Enneccerus to sink Illustrious. They chanced upon the light cruisers HMS Southampton and Gloucester. Hits were scored on both; Southampton was so badly damaged her navy escorts scuttled her. Over the next 12 days, the workers at the shipyard in the Grand Harbour repaired the carrier under determined air attack so that she might make Alexandria. On 13 January, the Ju 87s, now equipped with SC 1000 bombs failed to achieve a hit. On 14 January, 44 Ju 87s scored a hit on the ill-fated after lift. On 18 January, the Germans switched to attacking the airfields at Hal Far and RAF Luqa in an attempt to win air superiority before returning to Illustrious. On 20 January, two near misses breached the hull below the water line and hurled her hull against the wharf. Nevertheless, the engineers won the battle. On 23 January, she slipped out of Grand Harbour, and arrived in Alexandria two days later. The carrier later sailed to America where she was kept out of action for a year. I./StG 1 and II./StG 2 had failed in their mission to sink the aircraft carrier. Albeit the cost was minimal; three aircraft on 10 January and four aircraft until the carrier departed. By 5 February II./StG 2 was based at Trapani.

The Italian invasion of Egypt in September 1940 failed. A British Army counter-attack, Operation Compass, drove the Italian African Army back into Libya. Erwin Rommel and the German Africa Corps were dispatched to prevent an Axis collapse in North Africa. The 60 Ju 87s of I./StG 1 and II./StG 2 were dispatched to Tripoli. The two gruppen were the only offensive assets the Germans had in North Africa in February 1941. The German airmen were mostly from northern Germany and were unused to the harsh desert conditions. The first Stuka actions took place around the 14 February and resulted in the first losses. Operation Sonnenblume developed into a full-scale offensive which recovered Libya, with the exception of Tobruk. Enneccerus led his group on a carpet bombing attack in an attempt to support the capture of the besieged port. On 3 April Enneccerus lost three to six Ju 87s to the Desert Air Force in the Benghazi area. on 14 April, II./StG 2 and III./StG 1 lost four men between them over Tobruk; the port's defending fighter, from No. 73 Squadron RAF, claimed three Ju 87s.

Enneccerus maintained the pressure on shipping supplying the garrison while repulsing attempts to relieve the port over land. In May the group attacked the carrier Formidable without success. The carrier was damaged by the group, but not fatally. Enneccerus was personally credited with a hit via a 500 kg (1,100 lb) bomb. It hit the forward flight deck, then destroyed the 4.5 inch (11.43 cm) turret and blew out the starboard side of the ship below the fo'c'sle. One of her escorts, Nubian was heavily damaged in the same attack. In the Admiralty "Report of Proceedings", 26 May 1941, her captain, commander G. H Stokes reported after the action that some Stukas attacked from low-level.

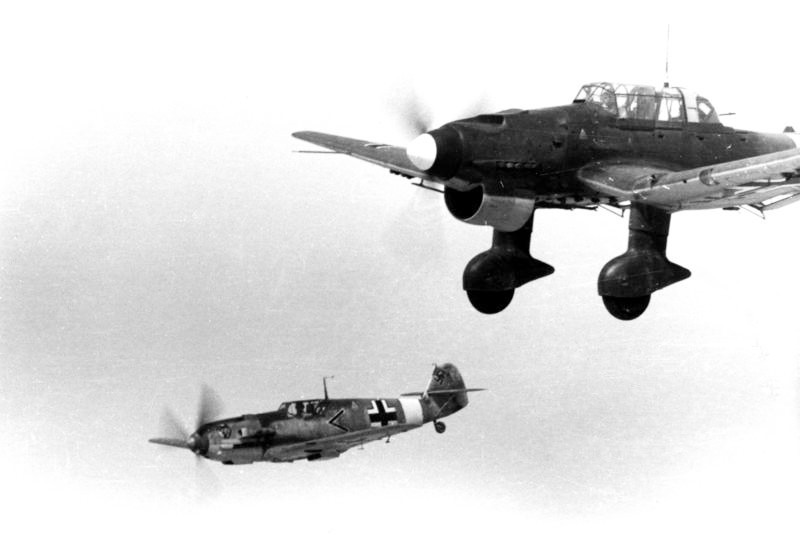
II./StG 2 Ju 87 escorted by a JG 27 Bf 109, January 1941

By 15 July the group was based at Derna. It fought over Bardia and Sollum during the British offensive Operation Battleaxe. That day it lost as many as five Ju 87s as Axis forces fell back into Libya and Tobruk was relieved. No losses were reported between 15 July and 30 October 1941. Subsequently, it is difficult to track the unit's movements and activities. Enneccerus' group was active in resisting Operation Crusader. First gruppe fought in the First Battle of Bir Gubi and Second Battle of Bir el Gubi. On 13 January 1942 II./StG 2 was renamed III./StG 3 at San Pancrazio. II./StG 2 was reformed in East Prussia, and sent to the Soviet Union.

=== Yugoslavia, Greece and Crete ===
In October 1940 the Greco-Italian War began with the invasion of Greece by the Italian Empire. The invasion failed, and the Greek Army pushed out their enemy into Italian protectorate of Albania. The prospect of British Empire support and the establishment of a second Allied foothold on the continent forced Hitler to assist Mussolini. Hitler developed Operation Marita, the German-led invasion of Greece with support from Romania, Hungary and Bulgaria. Yugoslavia refused to join the Axis powers, and the operation was expanded to include the country in German plans. Richthofen's air corps was given two wings of Ju 87s for the task; StG 2 and 3. Stab./StG 2 was moved to Kraynitsi, 42 km south-south west of Sofia, Bulgaria on 6 March 1941. Hitschhold's group, I./StG 2 followed on 27 March with 39 Stukas. II/StG 2 remained in Africa, but III./StG 2 under Brücker moved to Belica-North, 85 km south-south east of Sofia on 6 March. 35 of the 38 Ju 87s were available for combat operations on 6 April. The German invasion of Yugoslavia and the Battle of Greece commenced on 6 April.

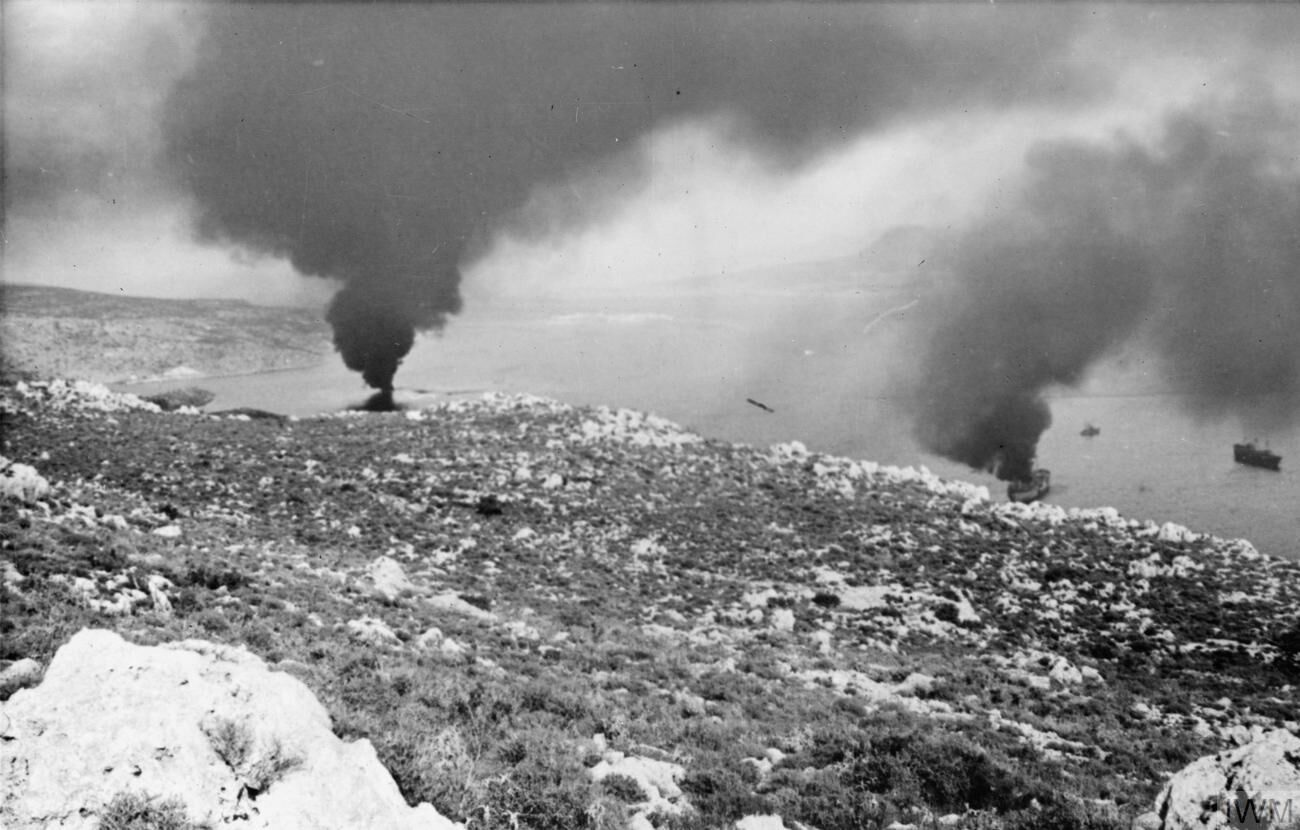
Suda Bay in the aftermath of a German air attack, May 1941

Richthofen's Ju 87s supported the German Twelfth Army in southern Yugoslavia, which cut the Yugoslav Army off from Greece and the Allied expeditionary forces there. The victory in Yugoslavia was complete with the bombing of Belgrade, which facilitated a rapid victory by destroying command and control centres. I./StG 2 dive-bombed Yugoslav force opposite Petrich and the Metaxas Line, and subsequent Battle of the Metaxas Line. It is not clear whether the group took part in the Belgrade bombing; it may have done. The group attacked British forces in Arta, and the advances on Skopje, Prilep, Veles and Salonika. The Stukas facilitated the breakthrough at the Battle of Lake Kastoria, and the battles at Olympia, Larissa, Volos and Battle of Thermopylae. They also supported the advances in Corinthia and Pelponisia. From 22 April they were operating in against shipping in the Megara Gulf. They also sank a number of ships in the Gulf of Corinth. III./StG 2 supported other units in the majority of the same battles. It flew combat missions against the Royal Yugoslav Air Force bases and notably assisted in the seizure of the Corinth Canal on 26 April.

The attacks against shipping evacuating Allied forces from Greece were successful. Richhofen's airmen claimed 280,000 tons of shipping (60 vessels) destroyed up until 30 April 1941; the claims were approximately correct. Athens fell on 27 April and the bulk of mainland Greece was under Axis control by 30 April. Operation Demon—the Allied evacuation from Greece—succeeded; three-quarters of 60,000 men were evacuated. Allied losses were substantial. The Greek destroyer Hydra was sunk in the Gulf of Megara on 22 April. In total the Hellenic Navy lost four torpedo boats—Greek torpedo boat Kios among them—three mine-layers and with Allied naval forces a further 43 merchant ships totalling 63,975 tons to the 23 April. Hitschhold's group flew daily attacks against shipping near and around Crete. Hitschhold's men probably sank the Greek destroyer Hydra at Piraeus naval base, which lost 23 vessels in two days. Greek destroyer Psara was sunk at anchor off Megara. Other Ju 87s from I./StG 2 sank other Greek merchant vessels in the Gulf Corinth. Among the losses was the sinking of the SS Slamat, in the Slamat disaster. British destroyers HMS Diamond and HMS Wryneck were also sunk.

The final phase of the Balkans Campaign, was the Battle of Crete. III./StG 3 moved to Megara and attacked shipping in the Aegean from 1 to 19 May and then Molaoi. Brücker's group was joined by Hitschhold's in preparation for the invasion. Hitschhold's I./StG 2 was moved to Argos. The invasion began on 20 May 1941. StG 2—both gruppen— with KG 2 and KG 26, bombarded anti-aircraft artillery positions before 493 Junkers Ju 52 transports began dropping German paratroops over the Cretian airfields. On 22 May Hitschhold's group sank the cruiser Gloucester with five 1,000 lb bombs. 45 officers and 648 men were killed. The ship sank in 35 minutes.

The unit contributed to the sinking of Fiji in the same action. The damaged Fiji was later sunk by Bf 109 fighter-bombers. Captain Louis Mountbatten led four destroyers under over of darkness past Antikythera island to bombard Maleme airfield. In the morning they were spotted at 07:55 hours m by more than 20 Ju 87s led by Gruppenkommandeur Hitschhold. The dive-bombers attacked immediately. They sank the British destroyers Greyhound on 22 May and the Kelly and Kashmir on 23 May. After taking a hit amidships, Kashmir sank in less than two minutes. Hitschold lost four of his Ju 87s. 131 crewmen died aboard Kelly and 80 on Kashmir. The destroyer Kipling rescued 129 men from Kelly and 153 from Kashmir but her oil tanks were damaged by incessant dive-bombing attacks on her way to Alexandria.

III./StG 2 participated in the action on 29 May, which sank the destroyer Hereward, and damaging of the light cruiser Ajax and destroyer Decoy. The destroyer Imperial was damaged during the attack and later scuttled. In the midst of the action the light cruiser Orion was hit; 107 men and officers were killed and a further 84 wounded. The damaged cruiser York, immobilised by Italian naval forces, attracted the Stukas, whose dive-bombing destroyed the ship's superstructure and armament. During the battles of Crete the gruppe claimed 125,000 GRT sunk and 20,000 GRT damaged.

=== Eastern Front 1941; Operation Barbarossa ===
On 22 June 1941, Operation Barbarossa the invasion of the Soviet Union began the war on the Eastern Front. Dinort and StG 2 moved to German-occupied Poland with Stab., I., and III./StG 2. The wing was placed under the command of Richthofen again, subordinating them to Fliegekorps VIII, attached to Kesselring's Luftflotte 2. The air fleet was detailed to support Army Group Centre. StG 2 was tasked with bombing Alytus airfield after 5./ZG 26 carried out a low-level attack. 8 SAD's 15 IAP managed to get airborne, though the I./JG 27 fighter screen; elements of JG 53 attacked the airfield simultaneously. Just two Ju 87s were lost on the Eastern Front on 22 June.

In the first days of the invasion, the gruppen supported the break through of the 9th army and 3rd Panzer Army, breaking through at Suwałki. They fought in the Battle of Białystok–Minsk, and the advances on Vitebsk and Vilnius, which forced a bridgehead over the Dnieper. StG 2 assisted in air attacks of Red Army concentrations near Grodno. From 22–30 June StG 2 lost seven aircraft.

The entire air corps was deployed in support of the encirclement and then a further such operation in the Battle of Smolensk. Richthofen, Dinort and Walter Storp, commanding SKG 210, were awarded the Knight's Cross with Oak Leaves for their contribution to the Minsk battle. StG 2 bombed the railhead at Yermachevo, and the road from Polotsk to Nevel. In July the wing suffered nine losses with another damaged.

I./StG 2's commander Hitschhold was shot down on 23 June near Vilna. 3./StG 2's Bruno Freitag landed to pick them up.

On 8 August Richthofen's air corps was moved to support Army Group North under the command of Luftflotte 1. Dinort was ordered to support the capture or encirclement of the city. The purpose of the move was to assist the 16th army's advance across the Velikaya River between Idritsa and Pskov, to Staraya Russa near Lake Ilmen. Thereafter, it supported the push to Lyuban on the road to Leningrad. On 13 August I./StG 2 knocked out a major supply bridge on the Volkhov River which disrupted withdrawing Soviet forces. StG 2 rendered invaluable support to the XXXIX Panzer Corps and XXXVIII Army Corps at Schlüsselburg, cutting off Leningrad, beginning the siege of the city and leaving the Road of Life the only means to supply the defenders. By September 1941, both gruppen were operating against supply and troop concentrations around Lake Ladoga. On 19 September StG 2 formed part of six major bombing raids against the city from 08:14 and 23:00. 442 people were killed when a hospital was hit. StG 2 lost three Ju 87s. Through August StG 2 lost three destroyed and one damaged and the following month five Ju 87s were lost.

The Baltic Fleet operated from Leningrad in the Gulf of Finland. The powerful fleet provided the Red Army with fire support along the coastline. Richthofen was ordered to destroy the fleet and he tasked Dinort with the task. The anti-aircraft artillery barrages over the city were heavy. Among the first victims of StG 2 operations was the Soviet destroyer Steregushchy. Soviet destroyer Gordy, Grozyaschi, and Silny were damaged. One pilot, Hans-Ulrich Rudel sank the battleship Marat. In the same action, the commanding officer of III./StG 2, Ernst-Siegfried Steen was killed when he was shot down attacking the Soviet cruiser Kirov. Steen crashed alongside the ship and his bomb detonated damaging the vessel. A third vessel, battleship October Revolution was damaged during the attacks. Soviet destroyer Minsk was sunk in shallow waters by a bomb dropped by Leutnant Egbert Jaekel. Hauptmann Günther Schwarzel took temporary command on 24 September until replaced by Gustav Preßler, 1 October. On 28 September, future Geschwaderkommodore Ernst Kupfer, flew three missions to Leningrad and was shot down each time; the first mission resulted in a hit on a cruiser but he was hit by Soviet fighters and force landed at an airfield. On the second he was damaged by ground fire after a hit in the engine. On the third occasion he and his gunner were wounded when they crashed into a forest after taking damage from ground fire.

Both groups were returned to Luftflotte 2 for the Battle of Moscow. The German offensive began on 2 October 1941. I./StG 2 fought over the Vyazma pocket until 9 October. Thereafter, it supported the 9th army and 3rd Panzer army advancing on Moscow. Fourteen days into the battle, Dinort was replaced by Paul-Werner Hozzel. Second gruppe was still in Africa. Hozzel could only call upon Stab, I. and III./StG 2 for the offensive; the units could muster 70 aircraft which was approximately 70 percent of the wing's strength. Hozzel's forces supported the push to Klin during the encirclement phase of the battle along with the advances on Kalinin and then Tula. From 21 October it fought over Torzhok against Soviet forces trying to encircle the 1st Panzer Division.

The temperature soon dipped and by the first week of November it fell to –20°. Ju 87 engines failed to start. Hozzel noted in his diary that only one operation was permitted on 13 November and one more five days later in support of the 110th Infantry Division. Hozzel utilised different ordnance depending on the mission supporting the advance across the Leningrad –Moscow Railway. For engaging Soviet armour, a 500 kg (1,102 lb) bomb with anti-tank warhead or a combination of three 250 kg (551 lb) bombs under the wings and fuselage. Primary targets at this time were troop concentrations, roads and railway traffic. Hozzel moved the wing six miles north of Mozhaysk, ten miles west of Moscow, on the Moskva River. Soviet resistance and the Russian Winter brought the advances to a halt.

On 5 December 1941 the Red Army counter offensive ended the threat to Moscow and threatened to destroy Army Group Centre. Gustav Preßler and III./StG 2 remained on the Eastern Front. Bruno Dilley [who replaced Hitschhold in October] commanding I group returned to Germany and did II./StG 2 which left Africa in January 1942; it became part of StG 3 and reformed in East Prussia. Dilley's group recorded the temperature at –50° when it left the front with virtually no serviceable aircraft. Over the course of October the wing lost nine aircraft, a single Ju 87 in November, and five in December.

=== Eastern Front 1942; Moscow and Stalingrad ===
III./StG 2 pulled back to Rzhev on 16 December losing seven Ju 87s in the transfer. II./LG 2 was attached to the gruppe but the combination could muster only 30 aircraft. JG 51 and the two bomber groups formed a provisional tactical command. The 4th Shock Army captured the supply hub at Toropets. The capture began a series of intensive battles which lasted another six months for III./StG 2 until withdrawn in May 1942. Recorded losses were six aircraft and one damaged. Eight men were reported missing, two killed and two wounded. The group was ordered to Markersdorf to rest and refit. It returned to the front to support the 1942 offensive towards Voronezh, before returning to Vyazma on 14 August 1942.

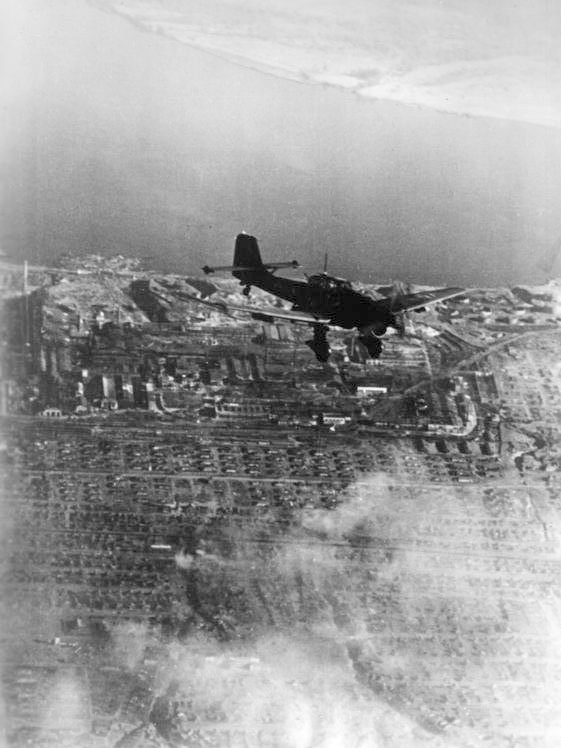
Ju 87 over the ruins of Stalingrad

II./StG 2 spent two months building its strength. At the time combat operations started on the Volkhov front in March 1942, it possessed only 12 aircraft, barely the size of a staffel. The group was in action over Novgorod and Leningrad, against the Baltic Fleet in April–the raids against shipping took place over the 24th to 27th of the month. I./StG 2 supported the relief of German forces trapped in the Demyansk pocket. On 12 February 1942 Gruppenkommandeur Dilly was shot down near Staraya Russa but returned to German lines. By 13 March it claimed 25 Ju 87s operational but lost two Staffelkapitän killed. Few losses were experienced to fighters because the Ju 87s were escorted by Bf 109s from JG 54. Stab./StG 2 remained at the front. It had on strength 9 Messerschmitt Bf 110s and one Henschel Hs 123. Three Bf 110s were lost from 31 January to 19 March 1942. The unit was still based at Vyazma on 22 March. The command was withdrawn to East Prussia in May 1942.

I./StG 2 moved at Graz in Austria to Akhtyrka airfield north west of Kharkov in June 1942. StG 2 remained with Richthofen's air corps, though now it subordinated to Luftflotte 4. From 22 June it supported German forces in the Battle of Voronezh, which formed part of Operation Blue, the 1942 German summer offensive into the Soviet Caucasus. The group began operating the Ju 87D at this time; it moved to Tatsinskaya Airfield on 20 July, then to Oblivskaya along the Chir River as the German 6th army advanced to Stalingrad. By mid-August it was bombing dug in Soviet armour west of the city. II./StG 2 lost 5 and 6 staffel commanding officers killed and wounded in the initial battles. The group fought at the Battle of Kalach in August, which defeated strong Soviet tank formations counter-attacking the 6th army. The Regia Aeronautica 21º Gruppo provided fighter escort during July 1942 owing to the lack of Bf 109 units available because of the actions over Stalingrad. The arrangement was not always adequate. On 25 July for example, 4./StG 2 lost four Ju 87s and their leader [Möbus] in combat with the 434 IAP. The two groups, with SG 1 and JG 3 helped the 6th army clear the Don Bend.

In the battle for Kalach German air units dominated the sky and harried the 1st and 4th Tank Armies. Despite the efforts of the Soviet 8th Air Army, the Kalach pocket was destroyed with the loss of 50,000 men and 1,000 tanks as German bomber formations attacked, troop, vehicle, tanks, rail and airfield targets.

On 23 August 1942 the Battle of Stalingrad began with the Bombing of Stalingrad from the air. Hozzel's wing was now based only 40 kilometres from the city. StG 2 was able to fly multiple missions per day and maintain a constant presence over the city. For the duration of the battle, this was "probably a typical day." The 62nd army commanded by Vasily Chuikov sought to negate the threat of German air attacks by engaging the 6th army in close combat. Hozzel remarked that StG 2 had to abandon traditional dive-bombing in favour of improvised tactics;

We had to do precision bombing to avoid danger to our troops entrenched too close to the target area. We could not risk making a dive-bombing attack from 4,000 metres because of the wide area of bomb dispersion. We had to fly a slant range attack, releasing bombs directly over the roofs. We had to push bombs directly into the target like loaves of bread into an oven, with one aircraft succeeding the other.

The heavy bombs employed by the Stukas were fitted with delayed-action fuses, and anti-tank warheads to penetrate roofs, buildings and bunkers. Hozzel described their impact; "As on a string of pearls, one plane followed the others within an interval of a few seconds, throwing the bombs onto an oblong target area divided amongst us. Not one missed its target." One Soviet soldier described the attacks as devastating to their defensive positions. Hozzel noted that the bombing was not as effective as German airmen believed. The infantry usually met a wall of return fire. Hozzel remarked that sometimes it seemed as if the "Geschwader had dropped toy torpedoes instead of bombs."

From 1 September II./StG 2 concentrated on sinking seaborne supply ships coming from east bank of the Volga. The Stukas proved effective in breaking up Soviet counters. On 5 September, the Soviet 24th and 66th Armies began an offensive against XIV Panzer Corps. The Soviets withdrew after only a few hours. Of the 120 tanks the Soviets had committed, 30 were lost to air attack. On 18 September, the Soviet 1st Guards and 24th Army attacked at Kotluban. The Stukas claimed 41 of the 106 Soviet tanks knocked out that morning. On 25 September III./StG 2 experienced a reverse when the 283 IAD intercepted it with 20 Yak-1 fighters. Three Ju 87s were destroyed and seven damaged. Acting group commander Günther Schwarzel, in the absence of Preßler, returned to base at Oblivskaya but died of wounds later.

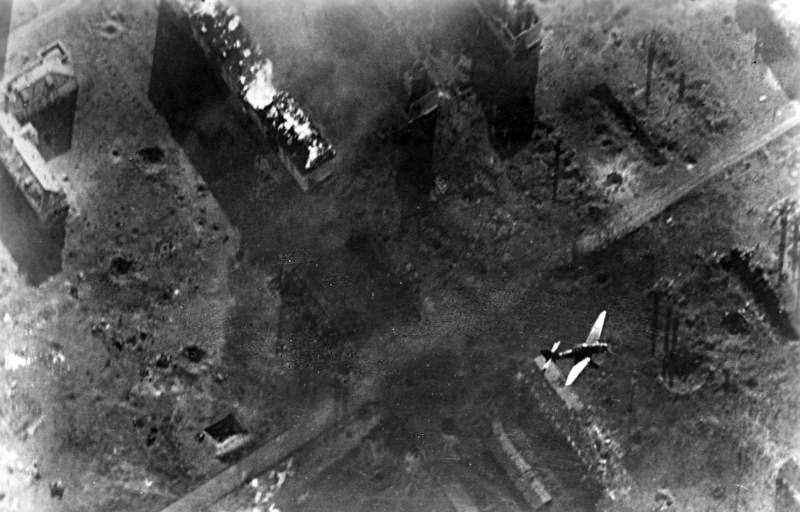
Ju 87 climbs away after dropping its bomb over Stalingrad, October 1942.

III./StG 2 served on the central sector as the battle in Stalingrad intensified. Gustav Preßler's formation supported the 2nd Panzer Army's Operation Wirbelwind east of Roslavl. III./StG 2 claimed the destruction, with the army, of 385 Field artillery guns and 550 tanks. The group supported the defence against the Soviet Kozelsk Offensive and the Battle of Rzhev, Summer 1942. Of the recorded losses, from 15 August to 17 December 1942 on the central sector the group suffered eight aircraft lost and three damaged. In mid-January 1943 it moved south due to the deteriorating German position at Stalingrad. The condition of the formation on 20 September was 29 aircraft with 25 operational. A report on 1 January 1943 simply listed 23 aircraft on strength.

The Ju 87 units flew an average of 500 sorties per day over Stalingrad through to November 1942, losing an average of only one Stuka per day. The Battle of Stalingrad marked the high point in the fortunes of the Stuka. First group fought over Stalingrad continuously. By 20 September it had only 16 operational Ju 87s from 25. In late September it was withdrawn to Stalino to rest and refit. In mid-October, after receiving reinforcements from the Caucasus theatre, the Luftwaffe intensified its efforts. Luftflotte 4 flew 1,250 sorties on 14 October and its Stukas dropped 550 tonnes of bombs. StG 1, 2, and 77 largely silenced Soviet artillery on the eastern bank of the Volga before bombing shipping that tried to reinforce the pockets of resistance. The German attacks forced the defenders a 1-kilometre (1,000-yard) strip of land on the western bank;, over 1,208 Stuka missions were flown in an effort to eliminate them. The previous day, II./StG 2 lost its future commander Martin Möbus wounded.

On 19 November 1942 the Red Army began Operation Uranus, an encirclement operation which encircled the German 6th army and several other Axis armies in Stalingrad. The chaos of the evacuation of Stalingrad, partial elements of II gruppe, either some or all of 6 staffel under the command of Oberleutnant Heinz Jungclausen operated from inside the pocket until December. This unit flew 200 sorties from within Stalingrad. On 1 January 1943 no operational aircraft appeared in the record. After the Raid on Tatsinskaya, the airfield itself fell on 7 January and the group suffered heavy losses in ground personnel. The solitary remaining Ju 87 in 4 staffel was blown up to prevent its capture. StG 2 attempted to provide support for the Romanian 3rd Army and Romanian 4th Army on 21 November, contributing 141 dive bombing missions which cost it five Ju 87s. One group based at Tusov airfield 20 miles west of Kalach, escaped tanks of the 26th Soviet Tank Corps by flying away though other units were caught. Stab., I., and II./StG 2 reported 40 aircraft destroyed—17 to enemy action, 11 to other causes, six damaged and under repair and six sent to other units. The remainder are not specified in the Quartermaster records or StG 2's war diary. At least 25 Ju 87s were lost or severely damaged in November 1942. On 24 November 1942 another significant loss was Hauptmann Joachim Langbehn, a veteran of 400 combat missions. He was posthumously awarded the Knight's Cross. A notable success occurred when Rudel led 1./StG 2 into combat against elements of the 5th Tank Army, 8th Cavalry Corps reached the airfield at Oblivskaya. The last tank was destroyed on the airfield perimeter.

I./StG 2 was trapped inside at Karpovka airfield until the site was overrun by Soviet tanks. The group's ground personnel were utilised as infantry. Flying personnel relocated to Morosovskaya, north east of Rostov-on-Don to continue operations in appalling weather conditions. The airfield was abandoned in the face of Soviet advances and five Ju 87s were destroyed by the group. It reported 44 Ju 87s on strength three days earlier and the group relocated to Nikolayev. 700 ground crew from StG 2 were left behind in Stalingrad. They formed an improvised Luftwaffe field battalion and were lost in the destruction of the pocket. The group supported the failed relief effort, Operation Winter Storm. By 25 December 1942 it had been reduced to a dozen operational machines. It scored some tactical successes and inflicted heavy losses on the 25th Tank Corps, the 1st Guards Mechanized Corps and their motorised formations approaching Morosovskaya, due in part to the Red Army advancing beyond air support and the weather improving. One pilot was able to fly nine missions without fearing Soviet fight opposition. III./StG 2 supported the defence of the 2nd Hungarian Army and the Italian 8th Army near Voronezh. The Voronezh Front reached the Oskol River when it came under attack by the group. Knight's Cross winner Siegfried Huber was killed in bad weather conditions, on his 434th combat mission representing the loss of another veteran. Dr Hermann Roer, III./StG 2 noted in his diary, "during its operations to ward off attacks against the German lines of defence, 4 staffel became almost obliterated."

=== Eastern Front 1943: Crimea, Kuban and Kursk ===
I./StG 2 did not return to Stalingrad. The remnants of the group were based at Samorsk, north of Kalach in the Crimea by 15 February 1943. Operating under Fliegerkorps VIII the formation fought against Soviet advances towards Dnepropetrovsk and the Dnieper River. Elements bombed the Black Sea port of Novorossisk on 27 February and it fought over the Mius and Taganrog front from Stalino, in the Donets Basin. The group also operated in the Kharkov area and around Belgorod in March 1943. In the first half of April 1943, it fought over the Kuban bridgehead, on the Taman Peninsula from Kerch. On 16 April it bombed the beachhead at Novorossisk, where Black Sea Fleet infantry had made an amphibious landing. II./StG 2 supported the same operations, but fought at the Third Battle of Kharkov. From 2 March to 27 June 1943, the group recorded the loss of 15 Ju 87s and one damaged. Nine men were posted missing, three wounded and six killed. III./StG 2 conducted wider ranging operations in 1943. The main body of the group was still at Vyazma but elements fought at Kharkov, then south along the Voronezh, Rossosh and Millerovo. Some staffeln were known to have fought at Third Kharkov. From 1 to 15 April, elements transferred from Poltava to Kerch and operate dover the Kuban bridgehead. The group prevented the advance of Soviet forces through to the Sea of Azov from 5 May. The group used incendiary bombs to burn off reeds and vegetation surrounding the lagoons and swamps to expose Soviet infantry. The group claimed the destruction of 427 small boats. The Soviets abandoned attempts to negotiate the region on 4 July. Nine Ju 87s were reported as destroyed and another two damaged; 9 crew were killed, one wounded and two missing.

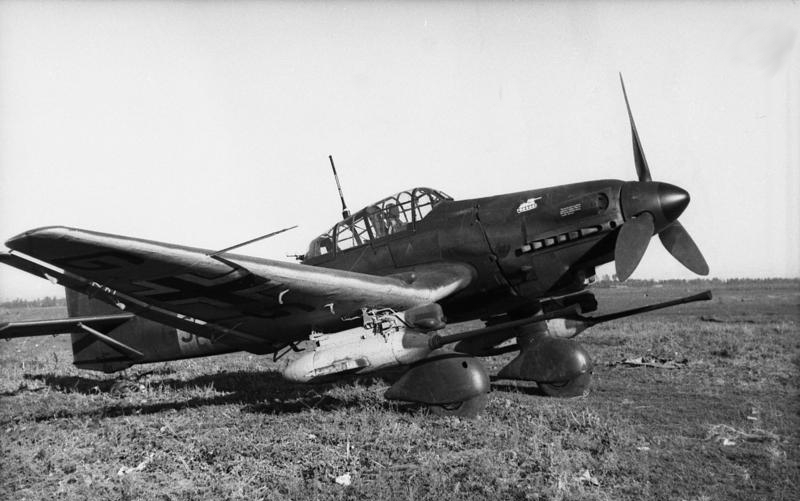
Ju 87 G-1 "Kanonenvogel" with its twin Bordkanone 3.7 cm (1.46 in) underwing gun pods.

From 1943, the large numbers of T-34 medium tanks created an urgent need for heavier aerial weapons to destroy them. The German aircraft industry failed to produce a replacement for the Ju 87, which forced its continued use with new weapons. The BK 3,7 cannon was introduced which operated on a remote pneumatic system rather than an electrically sighted mechanism. The weapon showed promise as an armour-piercing system. The muzzle velocity was 855 metres per second firing a 1.4 kg, 18 tungsten-cored explosive shell. It could penetrate 58 mm of armour at a 60-degree angle of impact at a range of 100 metres and 95 mm armour could be penetrated at a range of 600 metres at a 90-degree horizontal trajectory. Further improvements allowed for penetrations of 140 mm of armour at the same range. The weight of the weapon required the wing to be strengthened which led to the Ju 87G-2. StG 2 were involved in loaning their experienced pilots to test the new Ju 87G. Hans-Karl Stepp [commander of StG 2 for the final 18 days of its existence] and Hans-Ulrich Rudel tested the new types. The Experimental Tank Fighting Unit went into battle near Bryansk on 18 March 1943 and accounted for a large number of the 116 Soviet tanks destroyed. Andreas Kuffner and Rudel became well-known and successful tank-busters on Ju 87Gs.

In late June and early July 1943, StG 2 moved north to the Kharkov region in preparation for Operation Citadel, the Battle of Kursk. Ernst Kupfer took command of the wing, effective from 13 March 1943. Stab./StG 2 moved to Kharkov-East and was followed by I./StG 2 on 4 July. The group reported 37 Ju 87s on 1 July. II./StG 2 moved to Kharkov-North on 5 July under the command of Hans-Karl Stepp [from 17 June 1943] with 36 Ju 87s. III./StG 2 joined Stab. and I./StG 2 at Kharkov-East with 35 Ju 87s reported on 1 July 1943.

StG 2 was engaged in the massive air battles on the southern sector. On 5 July it lost six Stukas. With StG 77, it flew the bulk of the sorties for Fliegerkorps VIII on 8 July; some 701 missions in total. The wing provided close air support to the II SS Panzercorps. On 9 July StG 2 lost five of the six Ju 87s lost by the air corps. The losses of the 9 July was a stark warning to the dive-bomber forces that faced mounting difficulties in daylight operations over contested airspace. From 9 July, the number Stuka sorties fell from over 1,000 on 5 July to 700 to 800 in the following dayes, to half that from 10 July. The wing fought at the Battle of Prokhorovka, but StG 2 and 77 made their weakest contribution to the battle thus far. Only 150 combat sorties were flown between them; compared to 471 the previous day and 1,071 on 5 July. Rudel claimed 12 tanks—though his success and tanks kills have been questioned by historians and other German pilots. On 13 and 14 July the wing lost two aircraft on each day. During bombing missions to support the 4th Panzer Army's 2nd SS Panzer Division at the village of Belenikhino, StG 2 lost another veteran, commander of 5./StG 2 Knight's Cross winner Günther Schmid. An irreplaceable veteran of 700 dive-bombing missions died when his Ju 87 exploded in mid-air near Vinogradovka.

From 16 July StG 2 covered the German II SS Panzer Corps resisting Operation Polkovodets Rumyantsev. II./StG 2 lost three Ju 87s in combat. I. and III./StG 2 were rushed north on 15 July 1943 when a Soviet offensive, Operation Kutuzov threatened to destroy the 9th army and 2nd Panzer Army. Upon third group's arrival the commander Hauptmann Walter Krauss was killed in an air raid on Orel-East on 16/17 July. Rudel succeeded him. Egbert Jäckel commanding 2./StG 2 was killed later in the day—another Knight'sCross winner. The air operations by Fliegerdivision 1, to which StG 2 was attached, succeeded in halting the Western Front's advance. 449 Ju 87 missions were flown on 18 July. SG 1 and SG 2 were heavily involved in the repulse of the Soviet advancement on the Orel-Bryansk communication lines. Staffelkapitän Heinz Junclaussen, of 1./StG 2, claimed the cannon-armed Ju 87s inflicted a heavy toll on Soviet armour. The Soviet official history conceded the failure of the 11th Guards Army was due to German aviation. The 1st Tanks Corps had only 33 tanks remaining at the end of the action on 20 July. The following day StG 2 lost another of its irreplaceable Knight's Cross winners. William Hörner, commanding 9./StG 2. The cost of the Kursk operations for StG 2 was 30 Ju 87s from 5 to 31 July 1943. Five of the Geschwader's Knight's Cross recipients were killed.

=== Retreat and disbandment ===
The Soviet summer offensives drove the Wehrmacht and its allies back into Central Ukraine, from August through to October 1943. I./StG 2 retreated to Karachev by 19 July. From 14 August it operated at Poltava, and then along the Mius front, in the vicinity of Stalino and over Dmitriyevka, 84 km east of Dnepropetrovsk by 29 August. The group ended operations at Pervomaisk on 18 October 1943. Of the losses recorded, there were seven Ju 87s destroyed and two damaged from 20 August to 18 October 1943. Among the victims was commanding officer, Alwin Börst, wounded in action on 27 September 1943.

II./StG 2 remained active over Donets, Nikopol, Zaporozhye and the Kherson bridgehead. From August to October 1943 it recorded eight losses and one damaged. 5./StG commanding officer, Peter Keller was killed on 28 October. The group was uniquely exempted for redesignation in October 1943 and continued to exist as an independent group attached first to Luftflotte 6, then luftflotte 4. In January 1944, 4 and 6./StG 2 departed the front for Neisse in Upper Silesia where they were renamed 10.(PzSG 3 and 10.(Pz)/SG 7 on 7 March 1944. They were re-equipped with the Ju 87G. Nothing is known of the units' activities in November and December 1944.

III./StG 2 remained in action supporting the 1st Panzer Army in the Kremenchug and Kirovograd sector in September, and were engaged in bridge attacks in the same regions as II./StG 2. It attacked Soviet bridgeheads along the Dnieper from Stalino to Melitopol. The group was renamed at Kostromka on 18 October 1943.

== Commanding officers ==
Geschwaderkommodore

- Oberstleutnant Oskar Dinort, 15 October 1939 – 15 October 1941
- Oberstleutnant Paul-Werner Hozzel, 16 October 1941 – 1 March 1943
- Oberst Dr. Ernst Kupfer, 1 March 1943 – 20 September 1943
- Oberstleutnant Hans-Karl Stepp, 1 October 1943 – 18 October [and with SG 2 thereafter]

Gruppenkommandeure

I./StG 2

- Major Oskar Dinort, 1 May 1939 – 1 October 1939
- Hauptmann Hubertus Hitschhold, 1 October 1939 – 15 October 1941
- Major Bruno Dilley, 15 October 1941 – 15 October 1943
- Major Dieter Pekrun, October 1941 - December 1941 (acting)
- Hauptmann Otto Weiß, 4 January 1942 - 22 October 1942
- Hauptmann Frank Neubert, September 1942 (acting)
- Hauptmann Hans-Joachim Lehmann, 1 October 1942 - 23 October 1942 (acting)
- Major Siebelt Reents, 23 October 1942 - January 1943
- Hauptmann Bruno Dilley, 8 January 1943 - 1 April 1943
- Hauptmann Wilhelm Hobein, 2 April 1943 - 23 September 1943
- Hauptmann Alwin Börst, 24 September 1943 - 18 October 1943

II./StG 2

- Hauptmann Ulrich Schmidt 1 May 1939 – 9 September 1939
- Hauptmann Claus Hinkelbein 10 September 1939 – 26 October 1939
- Major Georg Fitze 27 October 1939 – 15 December 1939
- Hauptmann Walter Enneccerus, 16 December 1939 – July 1941
- Hauptmann Leonhard Busselt July 1941 – 4 December 1941
- Hauptmann Schlitte (possibly Schutte; acting) 5 December 1941 – 13 January 1942
- Hauptmann Dieter Pekrun February 1942 (acting)
- Major Ernst Kupfer 6 January 1942 – 1 April 1942 [date is not certain and sources conflict]
- Hauptmann Martin Möbus 13 February 1943 – 16 June 1943
- Hauptmann Hans-Joachim Lehmann (acting) May 1943
- Hans-Karl Stepp 17 June 1943 – 9 September 1943
- Hauptmann Maximilian Otte 10 September 1943 – 18 October 1943

III./StG 2

- Hauptmann Ernst Ott 1 June 1939 – 15 April 1940
- Major Clemens Graf von Schönborn-Wiesentheid 16 April 1940 – 15 June 1940
- Hauptmann Heinrich Brücker, 16 June 1940 – 31 July 1941
- Hauptmann Ernst-Siegfried Steen, 1 August 1941 - 23 September 1941 (killed in action)
- Hauptmann Günther Schwarzel 24 September 1941 – 30 September 1941
- Hauptmann Gustav Preßler, 1 October 1941 – March 1943
- Hauptmann Rudolf Schwarze March 1943 (acting)
- Hauptmann Walter Krauß, 18 May 1943 – 17 July 1943 (killed in action)
- Hauptmann Hans-Ulrich Rudel, 18 July 1943 – 18 October 1943

10. (Pz)/StG 2

- Oberleutnant Helmut Schübel, 17 June 1943
- Leutnant of the Reserve Anton Korol, 1 September 1944

== See also ==
- Organization of the Luftwaffe during World War II
