= Hubertus Hitschhold =

German World War II dive bomber pilot and general

- Born: 7 July 1912; Kurwin, German Empire
- Died: 10 March 1966 (aged 53); Starnberg, West Germany
- Military career
- Allegiance: Weimar Republic; Nazi Germany
- Branch: Reichswehr; Luftwaffe
- Service years: 1930–45
- Rank: Generalmajor
- Commands: I./StG 2, SG 1
- Conflicts: World War II
- Awards: Knight's Cross of the Iron Cross with Oak Leaves

Hubertus Hitschhold (7 July 1912 – 10 March 1966) was a German general and ground-attack pilot during World War II. He was a recipient of the Knight's Cross of the Iron Cross with Oak Leaves of Nazi Germany.

== Early life and career ==
Hitschhold was born on 7 July 1912. After completing the Abitur, he began military service in the Reichswehr cavalry on 1 April 1930. Hitschhold and was selected for and began flight training. Hitschhold received his commission in March 1931 and was promoted to Leutnant on 1 March 1934. Part of the training was conducted at the Lipetsk fighter-pilot school at Lipetsk Air Base, Soviet Union. This military cooperation was secret and in violation of the Treaty of Versailles. In January 1933 the Nazi Party seized power under the leadership of Adolf Hitler. Cooperation ceased. The Reichswher was renamed the Wehrmacht; the Nazi German Armed Forces. In March the Luftwaffe (Air Force) was founded with the creation of the Reichsluftfahrtministerium (Reich Air Ministry; RLM) in March 1933. The Oberkommando der Luftwaffe (High Command of the Air Force) was created to control all aspects of aerial warfare.

Hitschhold transferred to the organisation. Initially he transferred to the Jagdfliegerschule (fighter pilot school) for further training in early 1935. On 1 October 1935 Hirschold was promoted to Oberleutnant. He moved to the Sturzkampfgeschwader (Dive-bomber wings) I./StG 162, then II. and III./StG 162. On 1 October 1936 Hitschold was appointed a Staffelkapitän (squadron leader) in I./StG 163, commanding 1 staffel. In 1936 it began equipping with the Junkers Ju 87 Stuka. The staffel, along with the gruppen (groups) were reformed into Sturzkampfgeschwader 2 "Immelmann" on 1 May 1939. Hitschhold commanded 1./StG 2. Histchhold held the rank of Hauptmann upon the appointment [dated 1 January 1939].

== World War II ==
StG 2 was subordinated to Luftflotte 4 in May 1939 and initially subordinated to the 2 Fliegerddivision (2nd Flying division), Luftflotte 4 and based at Nieder-Ellguth in Silesia. The wing formed part of the dive-bomber fleet with StG 1, StG 51, StG 76, and StG 77. The wing was to form the southern part of Case White, the Invasion of Poland in September 1939. The invasion was to act in unison with the Soviet invasion of Poland and it began World War II in Europe. The purpose of the division was to provide close air support to the 8th, 10th and 14th army. The division was reinforced by Wolfram Freiherr von Richthofen, commanding VIII. Fliegerkorps (8th Flying Corps), a specialised ground attack air corps. Richthofen was formally transferred to Luftflotte 4 in the first week of September 1939. In September 1939 Richthofen's force was a mere flying command (Fliegerfuhrer zbV).

=== Poland ===
On 1 September 1939, the Wehrmacht invaded Poland. I./StG 2 began the invasion with 37 combat ready aircraft from 38. On the first day, I Gruppe bombed Wieluń, with other elements of the wing. The StG 76 and 77 were also involved in the bombing against the undefended town which may have occurred when faulty intelligence reports asserted the existence of a Polish cavalry formation was present.Kraków, Katowice and Wadowice were bombed by the group on the first day of the invasion.

Luftflotte 4's bombers dropped 389 tons of bombs on 1 September, 200 on Kraków in 1,200 sorties. Leutnant Frank Neubert and Unteroffizier Frank Kilnger from Hitschhold's staffel are believed to have claimed the first aerial victory of the war against a PZL P.11. Captain Mieczysław Medwecki, 121 Squadron, was taking off from Balice airfield.

On 2 September I./StG 2 were credited with having devastated a large Polish Army force detraining in Piotrków Trybunalski. The gruppe supported the advance to Częstochowa then engaged in the Siege of Warsaw. Hitschhold's group assisted in the destruction of the Łódź Army's cavalry brigades alongside Richthofen's forces. I./StG 2 then fought in the Battle of the Bzura which destroyed Army Poznań and Army Pomorze; it bombed Polish forces in and around the Iłża forest. Hitschhold's unit then bombed rail targets in support of the Battle of Radom and Battle of Modlin. Hitschhold was appointed as Gruppenkommandeure (Group Commander) of I./StG 2 on 16 October 1939, ten days after the Polish capitulation.

Hitschhold transferred to Golzheim. I./StG 2 trained there during the Phoney War. Over the winter, 1939, Hitschhold's gruppe trained to knock out Belgian fortresses at Liège and opposite Maastricht, in the Netherlands in preparation for Fall Gelb. StG 2 was transferred to Richthofen in October 1939. In January 1940 it was probably located at Marburg. StG 2 crews undertook training in Graz, Austria. Targets were marked out with silhouettes to represent battleships to prepare the wing for anti-surface warfare.

=== Western Europe ===
On 10 May 1940 Hitschhold commanded a group of 40 Ju 87B dive bombers; 33 were combat ready. StG 2 remained under Richthofen's air corps command, part of Luftflotte 2, belonging to Albert Kesselring. During the Battle of France and Battle of Belgium, StG 2 transferred to Hugo Sperrle's Luftflotte 3. Hitschhold's gruppe attacked Fort Eben-Emael. The Battle of Fort Eben-Emael was crucial in allowing the German Army to breach Belgian Army fortifications along the border. The gruppe carried out attacks against Belgian reserves moving to the frontline. The Belgian defences in the region crumbled the following afternoon, after the French 7e Division d'Infanterie failed to relieve them under attack from StG 2 and Lehrgeschwader 2.

On 11 May Hitschhold's I./StG 2 continued operations over Belgium in support of the 6th army crossing the Meuse river. The operations were successful but costly. Five Ju 87s were shot down near Tirlemont 42 km east-south-east of Brussels in combat with Hawker Hurricanes of the RAF Advanced Air Striking Force. Three of his men were killed in action, one wounded in action and one was captured. Their assailants were from No. 87 Squadron RAF. 11 Ju 87s from I. and II./StG 2 were lost to 3, 87 and No. 607 Squadron RAF, despite fighter protection from Jagdgeschwader 27. Over Louvain the following day, Hitschhold lost two more aircraft to 3 Squadron. Hitschhold's group supported the 3rd Panzer Division and 4th Panzer Division at the Battle of Hannut. They conducted a 30-minute attack against Thisnes and Crehen to break the French Cavalry Corps. The group fought in support of the Battle of Gembloux on 15 May. Over 15–17 May, Hitschhold's group moved to Saint-Quentin, Aisne.

The capture of Liège airfield permitted close air support units to focus on the Battle of Sedan. The airfield came under artillery fire from forts still occupied by the Belgians until StG 2 intervened. StG 2 remained to support the 6th army's advance through the Dyle line before switching to support the 12th army for two days, south of Namur from 18 May. The wing contributed 200 sorties to the Sedan operation.

StG 2 and 77 intervened in the Battle of Arras on behalf of Erwin Rommel's 7th Panzer Division. StG 2 advanced into north-eastern France during the dash to the English Channel. It fought during the Siege of Calais and Battle of Boulogne. The ports were taken after bombardment from StG 2 and 77. Hitschhold's commanding officer Oskar Dinort lost both wingmen over Boulogne on 25 May. Four were lost. In a major action, Dinort led 39 Ju 87s and two gruppen in an attack on Admiral James Somerville's forces off Calais on 24 May. The 10th Panzer Division requested air support against Royal Navy warships bombarding their positions as the division fought its way into Calais. Dinort ordered Hitschhold to select a target. The light cruisers Arethusa, Galatea, and destroyers Grafton, Greyhound, Verity, Wessex, Wolfhound, Vimiera and Polish Navy destroyer Bzura were subjected to an intense dive-bombing attack. Wessex was sunk; Vimiera and Bzura was damaged. The Ju 87s suffered no loss in their unopposed attacks. Six of the Wessex crew were killed and 15 wounded. From 29 May Hitschhold led his formation in the Battle of Dunkirk until 2 June 1940, attacking shipping and Royal Navy vessel supporting Operation Dynamo.

I./StG 2 spent 5–7 June reorganising. From 8 June in supported the 6th and 9th army in crossing the Seine and Marne. It supported the 9th army's advanced on Laon. Hitschhold's group lost three crews on 8 June. Hitschhold operated over Longpont, north-east of Paris and the group claimed to have destroyed 20 to 30 French tanks preparing a counterattack north-east of the capital. Thereafter Hitschhold flew in the battles of Péronne, Roye, Chauny and Nogent. I./StG 2 provided air cover in the advances through Yonne and Loire. By the Armistice of 22 June 1940, Hitschhold's command had lost 13 aircraft.

=== Battle of Britain ===
In July 1940 the Oberkommando der Wehrmacht initiated plans for Operation Sea Lion, the invasion of the United Kingdom. The Oberkommando der Luftwaffe began an air offensive codenamed Operation Eagle Attack. The objective was the destruction of RAF Fighter Command in south-eastern England. The Luftwaffe began bombing British convoys in the English Channel to draw Fighter Command into battle and deplete its strength. The first phase of what became the Battle of Britain was termed the Kanalkampf (Channel War).

Hitschhold's I./StG 2 moved to Falaise in Normandy. The group transferred to Laon-Couvron. It staged through the Pas de Calais for attacks on the Channel convoys. In late July it relocated to Cherbourg. The group was placed under Richthofen's Fliegerkorps VIII. The group was equipped with 35 aircraft with 29 operational.

Hitschhold and first group were involved in the battles from 4 July. That morning Convoy OA 178 (convoy outbound atlantic) of 14 heavily laden merchantmen left the Thames Estuary, bound for the west coast and passed Dover safely on 3 July. German radar picked up the convoy and the Luftwaffe was ordered to intercept the ships. A Junkers Ju 88 reconnaissance aircraft from 1.(F)/123 flew over the Channel and reported that the convoy was south-west of Portland. I./StG 2 took off, led by Geschwaderkommodore Oskar Dinort and Hitschhold, from Falaise, Calvados with 24 Ju 87s, escorted by a Staffel of fighters from I./JG 1. The attack was followed by 23 Ju 87s of III./StG 51 after they had been hastily re-fuelled and rearmed. The ships were close to the French coast; Dallas City was damaged, engulfed in flames and collided with Flimson which was also hit and the ships took 15 minutes to disengage; Dallas City later sank. Antonio limped into Portland Harbour with Flimson. Deucalion (1,796 GRT), Kolga (3,526 GRT) and Britsum (5,225 GRT) were sunk and SS Canadian Constructor, was damaged for no Luftwaffe loss.

On 21 July 1940 Hitschhold was awarded the Knight's Cross of the Iron Cross and promoted to Major as Gruppenkommandeur of I./Sturzkampfgeschwader 2 "Immelmann". On 8 August Hitschhold was involved in a large series of battles over Convoy Peewit. In the late morning StG 2, 3 and 77 from Angers, Caen and St. Malo were escorted by Messerschmitt Bf 110s from V./LG 1, to attack the convoy south of the Isle of Wight, with about 30 Bf 109s from II. and III./JG 27 for cover. Supermarine Spitfires of 609 Squadron and Hurricanes from 257 and 145 squadrons attacked the German formations, joined later by 238 Squadron. The Ju 87s severely damaged SS Surte, MV Scheldt and SS Omlandia and sank SS Balmahasoon after. SS Tres was sunk by StG 77. SS Empire Crusader, in the lead, was hit by StG 2 and sank several hours later; four ships were sunk and four were damaged in the attacks. From 20 to 30 RAF fighters attacked the German aircraft and I. and II./StG 2 suffered one damaged Ju 87 each, StG 3 lost three Stukas from I. Gruppe and two damaged.

On 13 August Hitschhold and II./StG 2 commanded by Walter Enneccerus, were ordered to attack RAF Andover with the support of StG 1, along with RAF Warmwell and Yeovil. I./JG 53 flew a fighter sweep ahead of the bombers from Poole to Lyme Regis in order to tempt the RAF into battle. The sweep failed to attract or divert RAF squadrons. Instead, it succeeded in alerting the RAF defences a critical five minutes earlier. When the main wave of StG 2 arrived over the coast, they were greeted by 77 RAF fighters. II., and III./JG 53 and III./ZG 76 flew escort for the Ju 87s. The whole of No. 10 Group RAF intercepted. One Staffel of II./StG 2 was badly hit by No. 609 Squadron RAF; six out of nine Ju 87s were shot down. StG 1 and 2 gave up on their original targets owing to heavy cloud cover. Both headed for Portland.

On 15 August Hitschhold's group stood down while the other gruppen engaged in the large air battles of the day. On 16 August, StG 2 was fully committed nearly 100 Ju 87s to an attack on RAF Tangmere. Bf 109s from Jagdgeschwader 2 provided escort. The Ju 87s reached the airfield and carried out a devastating attack before Fighter Command could intercept. 1, 43, 601 and 602 Squadrons caught the Ju 87s as they exited the target area. Hitschhold's gruppe was attacked by 43 Squadron. The Hurricanes destroyed five of his Ju 87s and damaged three. Only one crew member was rescued. StG 2 was not involved in the battles on the 18 August, after which the Ju 87s was withdrawn from the air superiority campaign.

Ju 87 units sat idle on the French coast for the duration of the battle. In the winter 1940, these groups carried out sporadic attacks against coastal shipping. In September 1940 the group provided pilots and aircraft for the propaganda film Stukas. Thereafter, it trained for Operation Felix, an attack on Gibraltar, until it was abandoned in January 1941.

=== Balkans and Mediterranean ===
From 5/6 January 1941 I./StG 1 staged from St Malo to Graz in Austria. By 23 January Hitschhold's gruppe moved into airfields at Otopeni, north of Bucharest in Romania. Hitschold moved down to Kraynitsi, south-south-west of Sofia in Bulgaria. On 6 April the group mustered 39 Ju 87s for operations. On this date it supported Fliegerkorps VIII operations in the Invasion of Yugoslavia and Battle of Greece. It bombed positions in Petric and played a role in the Battle of the Metaxas Line. Hitschhold may have been involved in Operation Retribution, the bombing and destruction of central Belgrade.

The group bombed British Army concentrations in Arta, Greece from 9 April and supported the advance on Salonika and Skopje. Hitschhold's command facilitated the breakthrough at Kastoria which routed the Epirus Army in the Battle of Lake Kastoria. Through the remainder of April 1941, Hitschhold supported the advance on Olympia, Larissa, Volos, and the German land forces at the Battle of Thermopylae. The group supported paratroop drops on Corinthia and advance into Peloponesia.

The group staged through Larissa to Corinth. From 22 April Histchhold's group attacked Allied shipping in the Megara Gulf. I./StG 2 found target-rich waters in the Gulf of Corinth where, at Antikyra, the 1,300-ton tanker Theodora and 657-ton coastal tanker Theodol were sunk by 2 staffel. The Greek destroyer Hydra was sunk in the Gulf of Megara on 22 April. In total the Hellenic Navy lost four torpedo boats—Greek torpedo boat Kios among them—three mine-layers and with Allied naval forces a further 43 merchant ships totalling 63,975 tons to the 23 April. Hitschhold's group flew daily attacks against shipping near and around Crete. Hitschhold's men probably sank the Greek destroyer Hydra at Piraeus naval base, which lost 23 vessels in two days. Greek destroyer Psara was sunk at anchor off Megara. Other Ju 87s from I./StG 2 sank other Greek merchant vessels in the Gulf Corinth. Operation Demon—the Allied evacuation from Greece—reached its peak; three-quarters of 60,000 men were evacuated.

The I./StG 2 under the command of Hitschhold participated in the Battle of Crete, which ended the fighting in the Balkans until 1944. StG 2, with KG 2 and KG 26, bombarded anti-aircraft artillery positions before 493 Junkers Ju 52 transports began dropping German paratroops over the Cretan airfields. Hitschhold's group achieved success on 22 May. They sank the British destroyers Greyhound on 22 May 1941. The group also sank the cruiser Gloucester with five 1,000 lb bombs. 45 officers and 648 men were killed. Hitschhold watched the ship sink in 35 minutes as he circled above. Hitschhold's unit contributed to the sinking of Fiji in the same action. The damaged Fiji was later sunk by Bf 109 fighter-bombers.

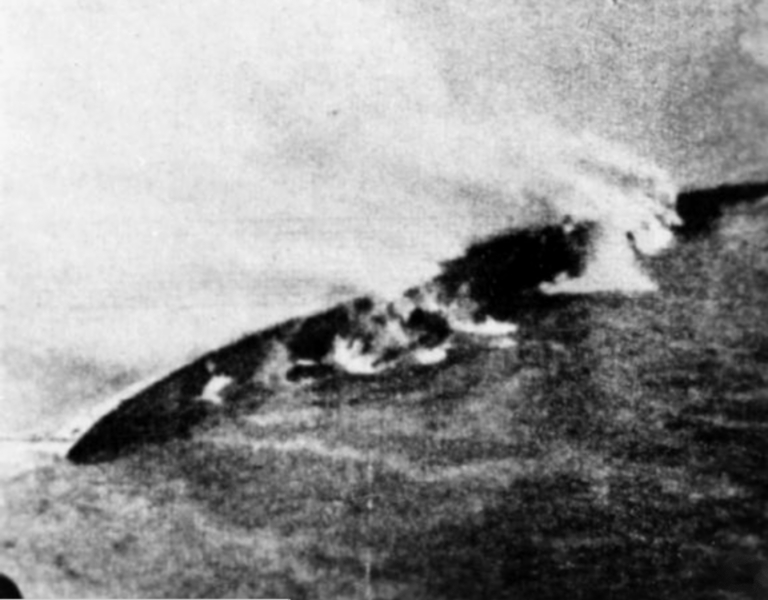
Photograph taken by a German airman recording the sinking of Gloucester, 22 May 1941. The vast majority of her crew perished

On 30 May Rear Admiral Irvine Glennie's Force D, consisting of the cruisers HMS Dido, Orion and Ajax were intercepted by Hitschhold's unit, which was now operating from Rhodes. They damaged Orion and Dido. I./StG 2 assisted in the sinking of destroyer Hereward. III./StG 2 struck the fatal blow. The end of the campaign came on 1 June. The gruppe claimed 164,000 tons of shipping sunk. If accurate, it amounted to nearly half the 360,000 tons lost by the Allied powers.

=== Eastern Front ===
Hitschhold departed Rhodes for Cottbus, and then moved eastward to Przasnysz, 88 km north-east of Warsaw in German-occupied Poland. Hitschhold commanded 35 Ju 87s. StG 2 remained with Richthofen's Fliegerkorps VIII, subordinated to Kesselring's Luftflotte 2 in preparation for Operation Barbarossa, the invasion of the Soviet Union.On 22 June Hittschhold was shot down but rescued. On the first three days of the invasion, from 22–24 June 1941, Hitschhold was ordered to support the 9th Army and 3rd Panzer Army, the spearhead of Army Group Centre.

Hitschhold's group assisted the breakthrough at Suwałki on 25 June, and engaged in anti-tank operations 80 km south of Grodno. He led II./StG 2 in the Battle of Białystok–Minsk, advance on Vilnius, Lepel, Vitebsk to force a bridgehead over the Dnieper. On 11 July the group attacked rail lines from Vitebsk to Smolensk, before supporting the destruction of the Smolensk pocket. On 8 August, Hitschhold was ordered north, to support the 16th army and Army Group North. The group supported the breach of the Velikaya River line, and the advance to Staraya Russa near Lake Ilmen. From 27 August to 8 September close air support was flown in support of XXVIII Army Corps and XXXIX Panzer Corps to Schlüsselburg at the mouth of the Neva River.

On 9 September, Hitschhold's group fought along the northern front depending on the situation as Army Group North neared Leningrad. Interdiction operations were flown against the Leningrad–Moscow rail lines. In mid-September I./StG 2 was based at Velizh deep inside the Soviet Union. From this point it enforced the Siege of Leningrad. Hitschhold's crews focused on the Baltic Fleet at Kronstadt. All three gruppen were equipped with new heavier armour-piercing bombs that arrived at Tyrkovo airfield. During these combat operations, one of Hitschhold's men, a then unknown Hans-Ulrich Rudel, sank the Soviet battleship Marat at the cost of several Ju 87s. A notable casualty was Staffelkapitän Ernst Kupfer, who survived. Kupfer flew three missions on 28 September, and on each mission his aircraft was badly damaged. The Soviet destroyer Minsk, and Steregushchi were sunk in the same raid.

I./StG 2 moved to Army Group Centre once more for the Battle of Moscow on 2 October 1941. Hitschhold fought at Vyazma and Kalinin in support of the 3rd Panzer Army and 9th Army. The group flew in support of operations to relieve the 1st Panzer Division from a potential encirclement. On 15 October Hitschhold was relieved of command of I/StG 2. Hitschhold was moved to the 1st Dive-bomber school as an instructor, and on 31 December 1941 he was awarded the 57th Knight's Cross with Oak Leaves with a promotion to Major for his service as Gruppenkommandeur of I./Sturzkampfgeschwader 2 "Immelmann".

Oberstleutnant Hubertus Hitschhold replaced Otto Weiß as commanding officer of Schlachtgeschwader 1 on 18 June 1942. Hitschhold's appointment came prior to the beginning of Operation Blue, the summer offensive into the Caucasus. The wing operated the Bf 109E and Henschel Hs 129 in the ground-attack role. Schl.G. 1 flew ground attack and counter air operations. On 8 July was ordered to attack the airfield at Kamesnk to relieve pressure on the army from the Red Air Force. It claimed 20 aircraft, yet no more than one two were actually destroyed. By 20 July, the wing had only 36 aircraft operational after the battles across the Donets and Don River. In August Hitschhold led the wing in the Battle of Kalach and Battle of Stalingrad.

On 19 November 1942 the Red Army began Operation Uranus. The offensive broke through north and south of Axis lines around Stalingrad and encircled the German, Italian, Hungarian and Romanian armies in and around the city.

Hitschhold's wing did contribute to the destruction of the Soviet 5th Tank Army's 8th Cavalry Corps at Oblivskaya on 26 November. The aircraft went into action as ground personnel from his command manned the trenches around the town. The last of the Soviet tanks was purportedly destroyed at the edge of SG 1's airfield. Hitachhold's second group lost eight aircraft in these battles. By 1 December 1942, it possessed just five Hs 129s, 10 Bf 109E-7s and 11 Henschel Hs 123s.

Hitschhold's crews supported Operation Winter Storm, and assisted the Italian Army in Russia escape destruction in the Soviet Operation Little Saturn. On 16 and 17 December 1942 the specialised 4.(Pz)/SG. 1 destroyed ten Soviet tanks with their six Hs 129s, now armed with MK 101 cannon. Within three days, Italian lines had collapsed, and II./Schl.G. 1 abandoned Millerovo, as the 18th Tank Corps approached.

Second group in particular, flying from the Rossosh area on 6 December 1942, attacked Soviet armoured spearheads attacking the 3rd Romanian and 8th Italian Army. By 22 December it had pulled back to Voroshilovgrad. Among the successes, was the repulse of a tank attack by the 1st Guards Army against Antonovka near Millerovo on 2 January 1943; which was defeated largely because of the tank-busting formations from II./SG 1. The 3rd Guards Army approached Morozovsk, forcing 7. Staffel to abandon some Hs 123s there.

In 1943 Hitschhold's main successful contribution was the support of the Waffen SS at the Third Battle of Kharkov, which allowed the Germans to recapture the city and Belgorod. In May first group converted to the Focke-Wulf Fw 190. It was positioned in the Izyum sector until July 1943. SG 1 was not afforded any rest. Elements moved southwest of Rostov-on-Don, and fought in the Taman Peninsula, at the Kuban bridgehead in support of the 17th Army.

=== General der Schlachtflieger ===
The Kuban was Hitschhold's last battle in the field. In June 1943 he was relieved of command from SG 1 on 10 June and promoted to Oberst. Hitschhold was appointed Fliegerführer Sardinien, responsible for the coordination of air units in Sicily. FliegerführerLuftflotte 2 Fliegerkorps II's previous headquarters at Viterbo was appropriated by FliegerführerLuftflotte 2 under Hitschhold. Hitschhold was directly subordinated to Fliegerkorps II. Hitschhold was to assume command of all the bomber, fighter, reconnaissance and ground-attack units in support of the 10th Army. Hitschhold's command failed to repulse the Allied invasion of Sicily. In September 1943 the Allied invasion of Italy succeeded in gaining a foothold on continental Europe. Naples was captured and only the Air raid on Bari yielded any success.

On 1 January 1944 Hitschhold was appointed General der Schlachtflieger, a position he held until 8 May 1945. Hitschhold advocated ending Ju 87 production in favour of the Fw 190. Production ended only in September 1944. On 1 January 1945 Hitschhold was promoted to Generalmajor, a position he held until the German surrender in May 1945.

== Awards ==
- Iron Cross (1939)
  - 2nd Class (15 September 1939)
  - 1st Class (11 May 1940)
- Knight's Cross of the Iron Cross with Oak Leaves
  - Knight's Cross on 21 July 1940 as Major and Gruppenkommandeur of I./Sturzkampfgeschwader 2 "Immelmann"
  - 57th Oak Leaves on 31 December 1941 as Major and Gruppenkommandeur of I./Sturzkampfgeschwader 2 "Immelmann"

Military offices
Preceded by Oberleutnant Otto Weiß	Commander of Schlachtgeschwader 1; 18 June 1942 – June 1943	Succeeded by Oberleutnant Alfred Druschel
Preceded by Oberstleutnant Dr. Ernst Kupfer	General der Schlachtflieger; 12 November 1943 – 8 May 1945	Succeeded by disbanded
