= Drakino =

Drakino may refer to:

- Drakino, Republic of Mordovia, a village (selo) in the Republic of Mordovia, Russia
- Drakino, Liskinsky District, Voronezh Oblast, a village (selo) in Liskinsky District of Voronezh Oblast, Russia
- Drakino, Repyovsky District, Voronezh Oblast, a village (khutor) in Repyovsky District of Voronezh Oblast, Russia
- Drakino, name of several other rural localities in Russia
- Drakino, name of the village of Molodye Vskhody in the Republic of Mordovia, Russia, until 1940
- Staroye Drakino, a village (selo) in the Republic of Mordovia, Russia
