= Schlachtgeschwader 1 =

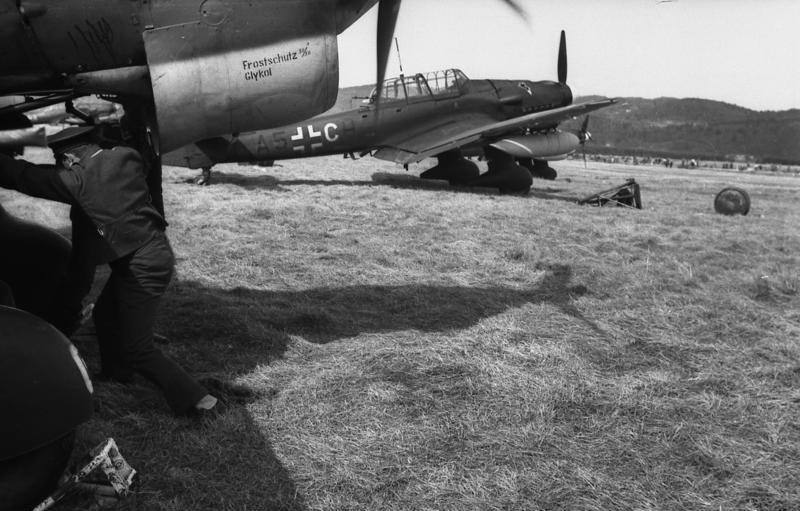
- Schlachtgeschwader 1
- Active: 13 January 1942 – 18 October 1943; 18 October 1943 – 8 May 1945
- Country: Nazi Germany
- Branch: Luftwaffe
- Type: Ground-attack
- Role: Close air support Anti-tank warfare Offensive counter air
- Size: Air Force Wing
- Engagements: World War II

Insignia
- Identification symbol: none

Schlachtgeschwader 1 (originally abbreviated Schl.G. 1 and latter SG 1) was a German Luftwaffe wing during World War II. It operated the Henschel Hs 123, Henschel Hs 129, Focke-Wulf Fw 190, and the Messerschmitt Bf 109.

== Formation ==
Schlachtgeschwader 1 was formed on 13 January 1942 at Werl, near Dortmund. The Stab (command unit) was created with personnel from II.(Schl)/Lehrgeschwader 2. The command unit had three Messerschmitt Bf 109E-7s and was placed under the leadership of Major Otto Weiss. Schl.G. 1 completed training in April and was immediately assigned to IV Fliegerkorps (4th Air Corps) under Luftflotte 4 (Air Fleet 4). It departed for the front on 2 May.

I./Schl.G. 1 was outfitted with Bf 109s from the same LG 2 group. It was equipped with Bf 109Es and Henschel Hs 123s biplanes. II./Schl.G. 1 was formed at Lippstadt on 13 January 1942. It had 16 Henschel Hs 129 attack aircraft with some three Hs 123 biplanes. All of I./Schl.G. 1s handed over its Hs 123s to the second group in May. First group was placed under the command of Alfred Druschel. Second group's leadership was handed to Hauptmann Paul-Friedrich Darjes.

The 4. Staffel and the 8. Staffel, while formally part of SchlG 1, operated semi-independently. 8.(Pz)/Schl.G. 1 was formed from 10.(Schlacht)/LG 2 on 13 January 1942 at Dugino. It was placed under the command of VIII Fliegerkorps. It had Hs 123s at its disposal but after training it returned to Germany, where it was briefly disbanded and then re-established with Bf 109s. In December 1942 it was re-designated a Panzerjägerstaffel when it received the Hs 129 in January/February 1943.

4(Pz)/Schl.G. 1 also operated independently under the same air corps. It formed at Dugino and Rzhev until it left for Germany to receive 16 Hs 129s, by 28 March. It departed the jurisdiction of the air corps in early April 1942. It was placed under the command of II./Schl.G. 1. The command Staffel and second group were deployed to Fliegerkorps IV, and to the Crimea. First group was handed to Fliegerkorps VIII and sent to the region. 8.(Pz) was under this air corps command until April. It is not known which group it was formally attached to in the Crimea.

== War service ==
In World War I the Germans developed close air support units and used them with success, and again in the Spanish Civil War; most notably the Heinkel He 51 and Hs 123 performed well. The Luftwaffe entered World War II with just one group of this type; II(Schlacht)/LG 2. That is all the Luftwaffe's 1 July mobilisation plan called for to be operational by 1 September 1939. The ground-attack arm (Schlachtfliegerverbände) (which did not include dive-bomber units) remained woefully neglected until 1942. On 2 September 1939, this force had only 40 aircraft. By 11 May 1940 it had 50, and on 21 June 1941, just 60 aircraft were in its employ. In all three cases, this was between one and two percent of Luftwaffe strength on those dates. The expansion of the arm in 1942, and until the end of the war, reflected the shifting policy of the Oberkommando der Luftwaffe and developments on the Eastern Front.

=== Eastern Front ===
I./Schl.G. 1 arrived in the Crimea with its Bf 109E-7s in the first week of May 1942. It did so as the Luftwaffe's only close-air support geschwader (wing). The Ju 87 groups carried out close support operations early in the war, but the dive-bomber was a general purpose weapon, and was used in a variety of roles. The Schlacht units were specifically for close air support only. The Stab unit was based at Itshki-Grammatikovo with first and second group.

Schl.G. 1 supported the 11th Army, under the command of Erich von Manstein in the Battle of the Kerch Peninsula (Operation Bustard Hunt). On 9 May it suffered its first casualty when a Hs 129B-1 of second group was shot down by ground-fire. Hauptmann Max Eck was posted missing in action. Nevertheless, the effective supporting attacks against Red Army infantry and troop columns immediately behind the front enabled German forces to break through. The Bf 109 fighters also engaged in air-to-air combat, though this was not the wing's mission. On 12 May first group claimed the first enemy aircraft shot down near Martovka. Kerch fell on 15 May. The cost to the group was two Bf 109s, lost to ground-fire.

4. and 8. Staffel also supported the attacks. Of note was 4.(Pz)'s attack on VVS airfields in the opening days. On 9 May the 15 operational Hs 129s of 8. Staffel claimed 40 Soviet aircraft destroyed on the ground. The wing scored "outstanding" successes against Soviet airfields at this time. The 743 IAP destroyed all of its aircraft save for one I-153. Major General Skripko, a staff officer attached to the VVS Crimean Front, remarked, "After dealing heavy strikes against out airfields, the enemy's aviation started blocking them - preventing our fighters from taking off." The airfield—Marfovka—was crowded with aircraft. The Hs 129s left 40 aircraft burning. They also supported the breakthrough of the 132nd Infantry Division which approached the airfield as the air attack unfolded. The division captured 30 Soviet fighters when an advanced motorised party overran the airfield.

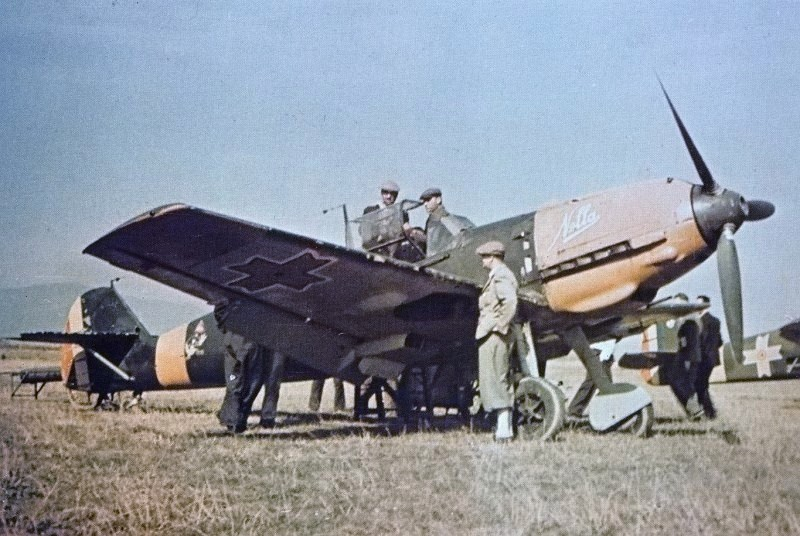
A Bf 109E in Romanian colours, near Stalingrad. The Germans operated the E series in the ground-attack role into 1943.

The wing was sent north to assist with a powerful Soviet spring offensive around Izyum and Kharkov, which became known as the Second Battle of Kharkov. First and second group were based at Konstantinovk, and were immediately engaged against Soviet motorised and armoured forces. Second group lost three Hs 129s on 23 May—a severe blow to the recently established group. Another sources suggests four fell this day, but the group still made successful attacks. The base at Konstantinovka was bombed by 7 GShAP of the 4th Air Army but second group's Hs 129s were not seriously damaged and reported no loss—their rugged construction helped. The battle ended on 28 May. During the month the wing flew 1,467 sorties; 1,028 Bf 109 missions, 259 by the Hs 123s and 180 by the Hs 129s.

Schl.G. 1 supported the summer offensive Operation Blue (28 June), into the Caucasus and southern Russia. The distances caused logistical difficulties and the Panzer-Grenadier-Division Großdeutschland and 24th Panzer Division were stranded for two days until supplies could be flown in, all the while German land forces were subjected to relentless air attacks. The 8th Air Army meanwhile flew 3,546 attacks against German forces from 1 to 8 July 1942. The Germans could not understand how their enemy could mount such an effort given the supposed damage the VVS had taken. Most German estimates exaggerated losses; for example to relieve the pressure Schl.G. 1 was ordered to attack the airfield at Kamesnk. It claimed 20 aircraft, yet no more than one Pe-2 and an Su-2 of 270 BAD were actually destroyed. By 20 July, the wing had only 36 aircraft operational after the battles across the Donets and Don River.

The German-led armies reach Stalingrad on the Volga River. The wing was involved in the subsequent Battle of Stalingrad. On 27 July, first group scored a success against Illarionovskoye aircraft west of Stalingrad, and destroyed 15 aircraft and damaged 13. On 13 September Schl.G. 1 was involved in a major offensive by the 6th Army into the city; it caused heavy casualties along the river banks with support from medium bombers and StG 77 and StG 2, as they hit artillery and rear areas. The Soviet fighter defences broke through the escorting JG 52 and 7. Staffel's commanding officer Josef Menapace, Knight's Cross of the Iron Cross recipient, was shot down, but survived.

Losses were light at this stage. II./Schl.G. 1 reported 25 Hs 129s and 20 Hs 123s on 1 August and on 20 September it mustered 46 aircraft with 28 operational. In October 5. Staffel was sent to Jesau to re-equip with Hs 129s while 7 staffel also operated Bf 109s, which had been sent in the summer to supplement the Hs 123 contingent. 5. Staffel was diverted to North Africa on 5 November. First group maintained 37 Bf 109s on 1 September, and after supporting the destruction of the Kalach pocket on 11 August, it moved to Tusov, near Stalingrad until November. Air operations were continuous against the city but flown at a reduced level into the autumn.

=== Retreat in the East ===
On 19 November 1942 the Red Army began Operation Uranus. The offensive broke through north and south of Axis lines around Stalingrad and encircled the German, Italian, Hungarian and Romanian armies in and around the city. The offensive caused chaos in Luftwaffe airfields as combat units took off to either fight the breakthrough or retreat in the face of approaching Soviet ground forces.

The 44th Mechanised Corps commanded by Vasiliy Volskiy, destroyed a dozen Romanian Bf 109s at Karpovka on 23 November. At least one Schl.G. 1 machine was destroyed there. The wing did contribute to the destruction of the Soviet 5th Tank Army's 8th Cavalry Corps at Oblivskaya on 26 November. The aircraft went into action as ground personnel manned the trenches around the town. The last of the Soviet tanks was purportedly destroyed at the edge of the airfield. Second group lost eight aircraft in these battles. By 1 December 1942, it possessed just five Hs 129s, 10 Bf 109E-7s and 11 Hs 123s.

The wing supported the failed Operation Winter Storm, and assisted the Italian Army in Russia escape destruction in the Soviet Operation Little Saturn. On 16 and 17 December 1942, 4.(Pz)/Schl.G. 1 destroyed ten Soviet tanks with their six Hs 129s, now armed with MK 101 cannon. Within three days, Italian lines had collapsed, and II./Schl.G. 1 abandoned Millerovo, along with KG 3 and KG 27 as the 18th Tank Corps approached.

Second group in particular, flying from the Rossosh area on 6 December 1942, attacked Soviet armoured spearheads attacking the 3rd Romanian and 8th Italian Army. By 22 December it had pulled back to Voroshilovgrad. During the year, 3,128 Hs 129, 1,523 Hs 123, 1,938 Bf 109 sorties were flown. The group claimed 107 aircraft in aerial combat, 91 tanks, 1,354 vehicles, for the loss of 20 Hs 129s, 16 Bf 109s, five Hs 123s. From the 1 to 16 January 1943, it claimed another 13 tanks. Among these successes, was the repulse of a tank attack by the 1st Guards Army against Antonovka near Millerovo on 2 January 1943; which was defeated largely because of the tank-busting formations from II./Schl.G. 1. The 3rd Guards Army approached Morozovsk, forcing 7. Staffel to abandon some Hs 123s there.

First group also fought in the defensive battles in deteriorating weather conditions. Itfloatedfour Bf 109s from 30 November to 19 December 1942; half to fighters. In air combat it claimed six Soviet aircraft on 7 December. On 31 December 1942 first groups 5. Staffel lost its commanding officer Oberstleutnant Josef Graf von und zu Honsbrock. In the first ten days of February 1943 2. Staffel claimed five enemy aircraft, the group's last until May. The main contribution was the support of the Waffen SS at the Third Battle of Kharkov, which allowed the Germans to recapture the city and Belgorod. In May it converted to the Focke-Wulf Fw 190. It was positioned in the Izyum sector until July 1943.

4. Staffel fought until its withdrawal to Stalino in January 1943. It lost two Hs 129s on 27 and 28 December. On 5 January 1943 it lost Eduard Kent, commanding officer. It was re-equipped with the Hs 129B-2 and then moved to Poltava until April. The unit was not afforded any rest. It moved southwest of Rostov-on-Don, and fought in the Taman Peninsula, at the Kuban bridgehead. On 8 and 13 May 1943 it lost two Hs 129s near Krymskaya. The Hs 129s returned to Germany to be fitted with MK 103 armour-piercing cannons. It was sent back to Russia at Varvarovka, in preparation for the summer offensive. 8. Staffel also supported these operations, losing nine Hs 129s from 5 April to 29 May 1943. The surviving crews were withdrawn to Zaporozhye.

Second group also fought in the Kuban. From 6 February to the first week in March, 1943, the group converted to Fs 190A-5s with the exception of 7. Staffel which retained the Hs 123. Based at Anapa it supported the 17th Army. Seven Fw 190s were lost between the 10 and 17 May. The Fw 190F-3, heavily armoured came into service in June 1943. On 1 July 1943, first group could field 52 Fw 190s, second group, 15 Fw 190A-5s, 18 F-3s, and 16 Hs 129B-1s. 4. and 8. Staffel commanded 17 and 16 Hs 129s respectively.

=== Kursk and Kutuzov ===
On 5 July, Operation Citadel began, beginning the Battle of Kursk. Action for Schl.G. 1 came on the second day. The German XXXXVIII Panzer Corps was bogged down, but the II SS Panzer Corps made more ground. The 1st SS Panzer Division Leibstandarte SS Adolf Hitler, at the tip of the advance, prepared to meet a counter-attack from the 2nd Guards Tank Corps. With support from JG 51's Panzerjägerstaffel, I./Schl.G 1 and 4.(Pz)/Schl.G 1 dived down up the Soviet armour; the Hs 129s of the panzer staffel attacked tanks while Fw 190s dropped SD-2 anti-personnel bombs with devastating effect on infantry. The last mission was flown as dusk was falling. The battle so badly damaged the 2nd Guards, that the 5th Guards Tank Corps carried out the second phase of the attack alone; and failed.

Hauptmann Bruno Meyer spotted another attempt by the 2nd Guards Tanks Corps to attack the Waffen SS division on 8 July. In exactly the same way, this time without JG 51, the wing attacked the tank and infantry. The infantry hid in nearby forests but purportedly suffered heavy casualties. German fighters allowed Schl.G. 1 freedom of action and German airmen noted poor Soviet responses to air attacks, presenting Hs 129s with easy targets. The wing suffered heavy anti-aircraft fire and most aircraft were at least hit. Soviet prisoners from the unit told German intelligence officers just how effective the attacks had been. The 2nd Tanks Corps lost 50 tanks to Schl.G. 1 and an unknown number of soldiers in exchange for two aircraft; one pilot was killed and one wounded. With the 2nd Guards removed from the line for a second time, the 10th Tank Corps attacked the SS Corps alone and failed.

Schl.G. 1 and the tank-busting staffel of JG 51 played an important role at the Battle of Prokhorovka on 12 July as the SS sought a breakthrough. The 5th Guards Tank Army advanced over 1.5 kilometres of open ground to meet German forces. The SS Panzer Corps air liaison officers directed the Schlacht aircraft, which played a greater role than the weakened dive-bomber groups, to attack the tanks and infantry with cannon-equipped Hs 129s and Fw 190s. Schl.G. 1 and JG 51's staffel flew 248 sorties against the dense groups of armour. The Soviet 31st Tank Brigade complained about the absence of their own fighters. A report from the 5th Guards said, "the enemy's aircraft literally hung above our combat formations throughout the entire battle."

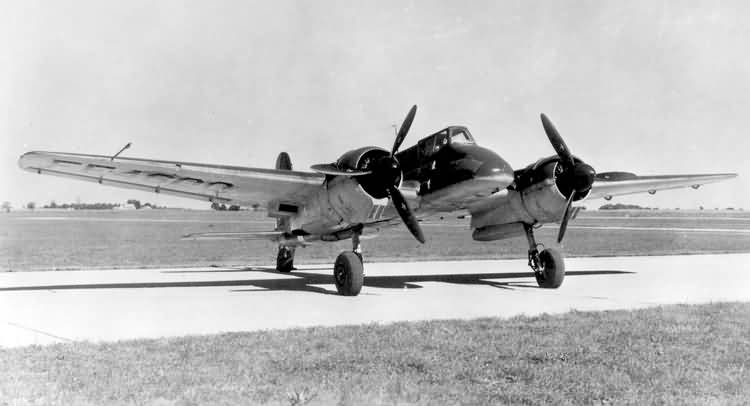
Hs 129. Schl.G 1 was the first unit to operate the type.

The VVS had concentrated on the Fourth Panzer Army's flanks leaving Fliegerkorps VIII in control over Prokhorovka. Schl.G. 1 lost 11 of the 19 aircraft lost by the air corps including six Hs 129s—all were lost to ground-fire.

The wing supported fruitless attacks in the southern sector until 15 July. On this date, the tank-hunting staffeln, 4 and 8, with I./Schl.G 1, 4./SG 2 and the tank-hunting staffel from JG 51, were ordered to Orel. Operation Kutuzov countered Citadel in the north and threatened to destroyed the 9th Army and the Second Panzer Army through encirclement after cutting the Bryansk-Orel highway and rail line at Khotynets.

The Hs 129 tank-hunting units were miss-used in the ensuing battle. Instead of attacking armour as it broke through the front over open ground, they were often asked to attack vehicles concealed in forests, carry out reconnaissance orientation in areas where Soviet fighter aviation was strong. The Schlacht aircraft flew 103 sorties, and shared 19 tanks, 70 lorries destroyed. From the 14 to 25 July, 30% of Hs 129s were lost; four per day. Bruno Meyer, commanding the Panzerjägdkommando/Schl.G. 1 recalled that Soviet fighter units were experienced; often concentrating on the leader of a German formation. Meyer stated his unit lost eight aircraft in a week.

On 17 July, 17 Panzerjäger and 40 Schlacht sorties were flown. On 19 July, Schl.G. 1 played an important role as the Luftwaffe alone prevented the breakthrough at Orel. The 1st Tank Corps arrived north of Khotynets on the evening of the 18th but were spotted by reconnaissance. The following morning 4.(Pz)/Schl.G. 1 claimed 50 tanks without loss. The Soviet 70th Tank Brigade, however, had severed the rail line. Later in the day, by chance, Bruno Meyer of the tank-busting staffel crash-landed near a marsh in the vicinity. He noticed a force of approximately 80 Soviet tanks expertly covered in camouflage. Using his aircraft's still workable radio, he transmitted his position. Major Georg Dörffel, commanding first group, picked up the message and led Fw 190s with 250kg bombs against the 70th brigade. Other air units were vectored to the site and the 1 Fliegerdivision claimed 135 tanks; 66 totally destroyed. The Soviet official history acknowledged the decisive intervention of the Luftwaffe and remarked that the 1st Tanks Corps only had 33 tanks remaining by the following morning.

=== Retreat and final battles ===
Schl.G 1's first group lost at least eight Fw 190s from the 8 July to 2 August 1943. One Fw 190F-3 was piloted by a general staff officer Oberstleutnant Horst-Wilhelm Hossfeld, who was posted for combat leadership experience, was destroyed by anti-aircraft fire. Hossfeld was killed. In the first five days it claimed 15 aircraft including 12 Il-2 ground-attack aircraft. Beginning on 4 August it fell back to Karachev, then Bryansk. By the beginning of September it was fighting in the northern Ukraine at Konotop, then Nezhin until the latter's fall on 15 September. On the fourth day, 1. Staffel lost commanding officer Hauptmann Johannes Meinecke killed over Mutino. On 6 October the staffel lost a second officer, Josef Menapace in the same way. Twelve days later the group was disbanded and reorganised as II./SG 77. 1. Staffel disbanded and was given to the remaining squadrons of Schl.G 1.

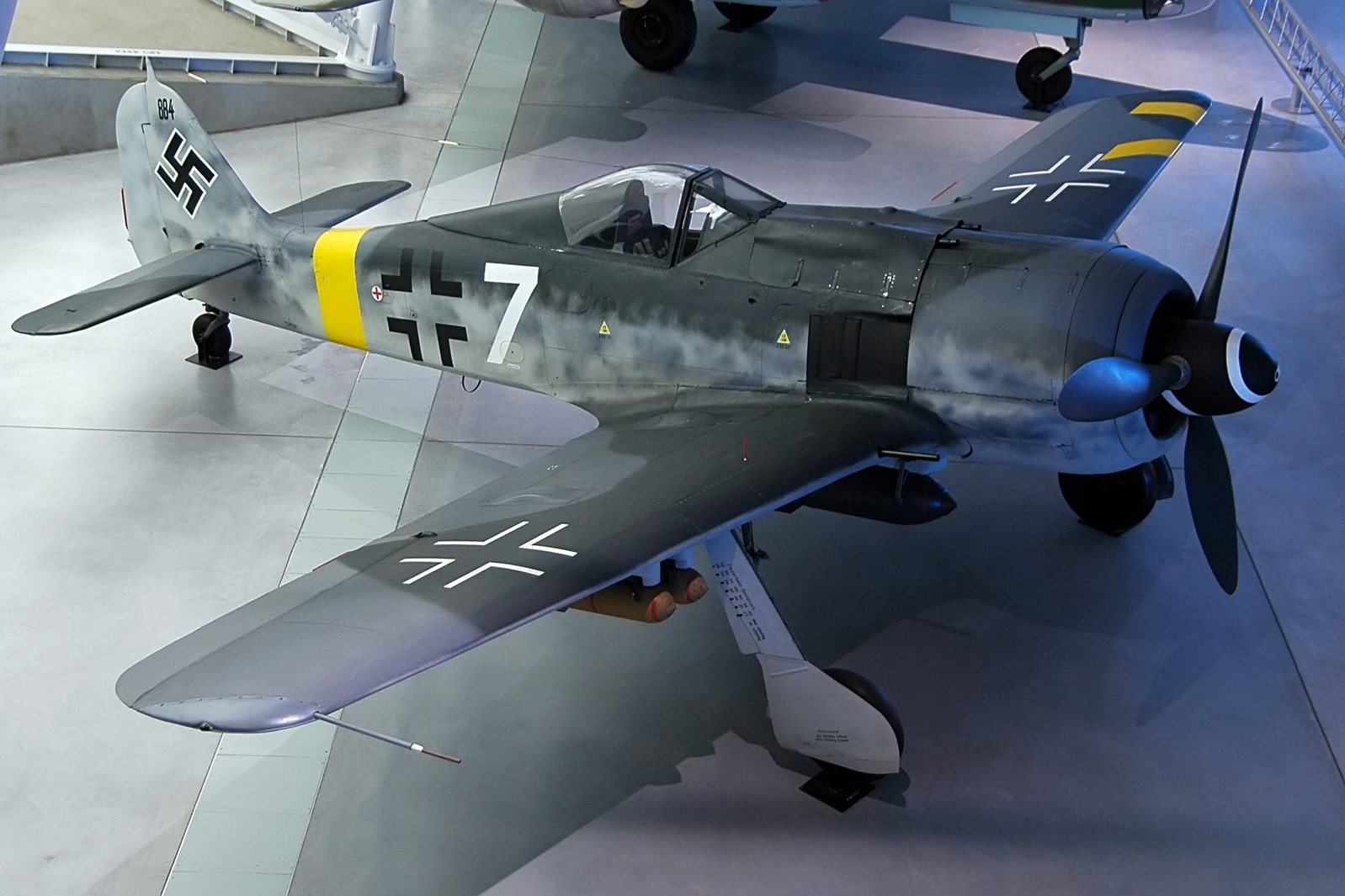
Fw 190 F-8 in late war, "low-visibility" Balkenkreuz markings

II./Schl.G 1 stayed on the southern sector and supported the withdrawal. It fought in the Fourth battle of Kharkov, which ended with Soviet forces liberating the city on 22 August. From 4 to 8 September it was pulled off the line and sent to Kiev, only flying missions against Soviet spearheads heading for the Ukrainian capital. Accordingly, because of this and a 14-day recuperation period, losses in September and October 1943 were light. Two group was reformed into II./SG 2; 5. Staffel became 8. Staffel.

On the same day 8.(Pz)./Schl.G 1 became 9.(Pz)/SG 9. 4.(Pz) was ordered to Orsha in October but there is no evidence this was carried out. On 18 October it was renamed 10.(Pz)/SG 9. The unit was purportedly leaderless at this point, its commanding officer Major Matuschek was killed on 19 July. It lost five Hs 129s in September, all but one on the ground.

The wing was reformed as SG 1 simultaneously, absorbing Sturzkampfgeschwader 1. Oberstleutnant Gustav Pressler took command. Stab./SG 1 was formed from Stab./StG 1 at Polozok. Major Horst Kaubisch formed I./SG 1 from I./StG 1. The three staffeln were formed from StG 1 in Bobruisk also, retaining the names (1., 2. and 3. Staffel). Hauptmann Heinz Frank took command of II./SG 1, originally II./StG 1 and its staffeln 4, 5, and 6, retained their numbers and changed wing. Friedrich Lang's third group was also taken from StG 1, with 7, 8 and 9 staffel at Orsha.

The redesignation caused SG 1 to inherit the Junkers Ju 87 dive-bombers from StG 1. First group would operate them into 1945, until they were partially replaced with the Fw 190. Second group began to replace the Ju 87 in July 1944 with the Fw 190, completed by the end of the month. Third group had completed the conversion by May 1944. First and third group's were placed under the command of the 1 Fliegerdivision while the second moved to the 4 Fliegerdivision.

All of Luftflotte 4's schlacht groups were ordered to counter Soviet armour advancing into Ukraine from 6 November, including II./SG 1. SG 1 was engaged in the Battle of the Dnieper and Battle of Kiev. The units of Luftflotte 6, which included the 1 Fliegerdivision, were thrown into the heavy fighting in October supporting the Third Panzer Army. The fighting reflected the growing efficiency of Soviet aviation. The loss rate of Soviet aircraft had fallen from 4:1 against at Kursk, to just 1.5:1 by this stage. In the spring, SG 1 moved to support Army Group Centre and were based in the central sector.

In June 1944, Operation Bagration began which ended with the collapse of the German front in the Soviet Union. I./SG 1 recorded the loss of 27 aircraft in July alone; most of which were Ju 87s. On 1 July it had 41 aircraft, and a month later this force had fallen to 26. It covered the retreat into Poland and fought against the Vistula–Oder Offensive. Luftflotte 6 flew 140 sorties against the offensive, with the fleet losing eight aircraft. A notable loss was the commanding officer of 7. Staffel Otto Hulsch, a Knight's Cross winner, who was shot down by Soviet fighters from the 16th Air Army. Four Fw 190s from III./SG 1 were lost in the fight. On 20 January 1945, SG 1 lost 9./SG 1's Gustav Schubert, another Knight's Cross holder, who also had the Oak Leaves award. Schubert had flown 1,100 missions and was credited with 70 tanks destroyed. The following day, II./SG 1's commanding officer, Major Ernst-Christian Reusch, Knight's Cross holder, was also killed.

In March 1945 SG 1 was engaged in attacks on the Oder bridges. On 7 March, 16 Fw 190s belonging to Fw 190s attacked the Zellin bridge, scored hits, but could not destroy it. At Ratibor, on 8 March, SG 1, with support from SG 151 and 3, flew 55 sorties against Soviet armour. SG 3 claimed seven tanks with rockets. At Göritz, II. and III./SG 1 breached the bridge in three places.

=== North Africa ===
5. Staffel departed for North Africa on 5 November 1942 and arrived in Tunis on 29 November equipped with Fw 190s. By early December 1942 8.(Pz)/Schlachtgeschwader 2, equipped with Hs 129Bs arrived. The unit had formerly belonged to SG 1.

== Commanding officers ==
- Oberstleutnant Otto Weiß, January 1942
- Oberstleutnant Hubertus Hitschhold, 18 June 1942
- Oberstleutnant Alfred Druschel, June 1943
- Oberstleutnant Gustav Pressler, 18 October 1943 – 1 May 1944
- Major Peter Gasmann, 1 May 1944 – 8 May 1945

== See also ==
- Organization of the Luftwaffe during World War II
