= Serdyuki, Voronezh Oblast =

Serdyuki Сердюки
- Khutor
- Location within Voronezh Oblast Location within Russia
- Coordinates: 51°02′N 38°38′E
- Country: Russia
- Region: Voronezh Oblast
- District: Repyovsky District
- Time zone: UTC+3:00

Serdyuki (Russian: Сердюки) is a rural locality (a khutor) in Butyrskoye Rural Settlement, Repyovsky District, Voronezh Oblast, Russia. The population was 79 as of 2010.

== Geography ==
Serdyuki is located 5 km south of Repyovka (the district's administrative centre) by road. Butyrki is the nearest rural locality.
