= Hermann Buchner (pilot) =

German World War II fighter pilot

- Born: 30 October 1919; Salzburg, First Austrian Republic
- Died: 1 December 2005 (aged 86); Hörsching, Austria
- Military career
- Allegiance: First Austrian Republic; Federal State of Austria; Nazi Germany; Austria
- Branch: Luftwaffe; Austrian Air Force
- Service years: 1937–1945; 1955–1979
- Rank: Leutnant (Wehrmacht); Oberst (Bundesheer)
- Units: SG 1, SG 2, JG 7
- Conflicts: See battles World War II: Eastern Front; Battle of the Kerch Peninsula; Defense of the Reich
- Awards: Knight's Cross of the Iron Cross

Hermann Buchner (30 October 1919 – 1 December 2005) was an Austrian-born Luftwaffe military aviator during the World War II, a fighter ace listed with 58 enemy aircraft shot down. A flying ace or fighter ace is a military aviator credited with shooting down five or more enemy aircraft during aerial combat. In total, Buchner is credited with 46 tank destroyed and 58 aerial victories, including 12 while flying the Messerschmitt Me 262 jet fighter, claimed in 631 combat missions. Following World War II, he became an officer in the Austrian Air Force.

Born in Salzburg, Buchner joined the Austrian Air Force in 1937 and subsequently transferred to the Luftwaffe following the Anschluss in 1938. Following service with various training units, he flew his first combat missions with Schlachtgeschwader 1 (SG 1—1st Ground Attack Wing) on the Eastern Front during the Battle of the Kerch Peninsula in 1942. Following his 500th combat mission, at the time credited with 13 aerial victories, he was nominated for Knight's Cross of the Iron Cross which was awarded to him on 20 July 1944. In late 1944, he received training on the Me 262 jet fighter and was later posted to Jagdgeschwader 7 (JG 7—7th Fighter Wing).

In 1955, Buchner joined the Austrian Air Force, serving as an instructor and officer. He retired in 1979 and died on 1 December 2005 in Hörsching, Austria.

== Early life and career ==
Buchner was born on 30 October 1919 in Salzburg, at the time in the First Austrian Republic. In 1937, he joined the Luftstreitkräfte (Austrian Air Force). Following the Anschluss in March 1938, the forced incorporation of Austria into Nazi Germany, Buchner was transferred to the Luftwaffe (the Nazi German Air Force). Trained as a pilot, he then served as an instructor with various Luftwaffe training units. (Note: Flight training in the Luftwaffe progressed through the levels A1, A2 and B1, B2, referred to as A/B flight training. A training included theoretical and practical training in aerobatics, navigation, long-distance flights and dead-stick landings. The B courses included high-altitude flights, instrument flights, night landings and training to handle the aircraft in difficult situations.) He initially served with Fliegerausbildungs-Regiment 22 (22nd Aviators Training Regiment) and then at the Flugzeugführerschule (See) 2 (2nd Sea Pilot School) at Pütnitz, present-day part of Ribnitz-Damgarten. He was then posted to the Jagdfliegerschule (fighter pilot school) at Werneuchen where served with 1. Staffel (1st squadron) from 2 June to 1 November 1941. (Note: For an explanation of Luftwaffe unit designations see Organization of the Luftwaffe during World War II.) On 2 November 1941, Buchner was transferred to the Schlacht-Lehr-Ergänzungsgruppe in Lippstadt, a supplementary training unit of Lehrgeschwader 2 (LG 2—2nd Demonstration Wing).

== World War II ==
World War II in Europe had begun on Friday, 1 September 1939, when German forces invaded Poland. In February 1942, his former training unit was redesignated and became 8. Staffel (8th squadron) of Schlachtgeschwader 1 (SG 1—1st Ground Attack Wing), a front line ground attack unit which was sent to the Eastern Front. Buchner's 8. Staffel was equipped with the Messerschmitt Bf 109 E. On 7 May 1942, Buchner flew his first combat mission in the Battle of the Kerch Peninsula. With this unit, which was redesigned in late 1943 and became part of II. Gruppe (2nd group) of Schlachtgeschwader 2 "Immelmann" (SG 2—2nd Ground Attack Wing), Buchner fought in the Crimean Peninsula, during the Battle of Stalingrad, and in Romania.

Buchner logged his 300 combat mission on 27 August 1943, his 500th on 4 March 1944. Following his 500th combat mission, at the time credited with 13 aerial victories, he was nominated for Knight's Cross of the Iron Cross (Ritterkreuz des Eisernen Kreuzes). From 1 June 1944 to 1 August 1944, Buchner was appointed as Staffelführer (acting squadron leader) of 4. Staffel (4th squadron) of SG 2. As a ground attack pilot with 6. Staffel (6th squadron) of SG 2, Buchner was credited with 46 tanks destroyed. On 20 July 1944, Buchner was awarded the Knight's Cross of the Iron Cross. At the time, he had been credited with 46 aerial victories, including a Boeing B-17 bomber over Romania, and 46 tank destroyed, claimed in over 600 combat missions. The presentation was made by Oberst (Colonel) Alfred Druschel.

=== Flying the Messerschmitt Me 262 ===
Buchner then briefly served with Schlachtflieger-Ergänzungsgruppe 154 in Proßnitz, present-day Prostějov in the Czech Republic, before on 15 October 1944 he was transferred to Lechfeld Air Base for conversion training to the Messerschmitt Me 262 jet fighter. He flew his first combat mission on the Me 262 on 26 November 1944 and claimed a P-38 Lightning shot down. The P-38 F-5 (work-number 43-28619) belonged to the United States Army Air Forces (USAAF) 22nd Photographic Reconnaissance Squadron and was piloted by Second Lieutenant Irvin J. Rickey who bailed out and became a prisoner of war. He flew a further 19 missions with III. Gruppe of Jagdgeschwader 7 (JG 7—7th Fighter Wing) on the Me 262 and claimed eleven more aircraft shot down. On 18 January 1945, Buchner married the Red Cross nurse Käthe. On 22 February 1945, Buchner, accompanied by his wingman Oberfähnrich Heinz Russel, on a bomber intercept mission, came under attack by P-51 Mustangs of the 352nd, 363rd and 364th Fighter Group. In this encounter, Buchner shot down and killed Lieutenant Francis Radley of the 364th Fighter Group. On 20 March and 22 March 1945 each, Buchner claimed one B-17 bomber of the USAAF Eighth Air Force. On 31 March 1945, he claimed an Avro Lancaster bomber shot down. On 31 March, 428 Lancaster and Handley Page Halifax bombers of the Royal Air Force (RAF) No. 1 Group and the Royal Canadian Air Force No. 6 Group attacked the U-boat pens and the Blohm+Voss aircraft factory in Hamburg. The bombers were supposed to be escorted by RAF P-51 fighters but had failed to meet up in the Netherlands. The attack force was intercepted by 30 Me 262 fighters from I. and III. Gruppe of JG 7 dispatched by the 2. Jagd-Division (2nd Fighter Division).

== Later life ==
Buchner, in the two years following World War II, served as an observer in the weather service of the American occupation forces. He helped found the Aero-Club Salzburg and worked as a flight instructor at glider school Zell am See. Austria regained its political autonomy in 1955 and Buchner joined the newly emerging Austrian Air Force as a flight instructor and officer. Buchner was one of the first pilots trained on the British DH 115 "Vampire" and later the Swedish Saab J-29. He served as a technical officer in the Jagdbomber-Schulstaffel (ground attack training squadron) in Graz under command of Major Karl "Charly" Bleckl. Promoted to Oberstleutnant and staff officer in Jagdbombergeschwader 1 and at the same time surrogate of commander Oberst Bleckl he was made commander of the airfield at Linz-Hörsching in 1979. Buchner retired from active service one year later. Buchner died on 1 December 2005 at the age of 86 in Hörsching in the district Linz-Land, Austria.

== Publications ==
- Buchner, Hermann (2008) "Stormbird" Manchester, UK: Crecy Classic ISBN 978-0-85979-140-3

== Summary of career ==
During World War II, Buchner logged 631 combat missions, of which 215 on the Messerschmitt Bf 109 E, 396 on the Focke-Wulf Fw 190, and 20 on the Messerschmitt Me 262. He was shot down five times, including two bail outs with a parachute, and was wounded twice. Buchner was credited with 58 aerial victories—46 on the Eastern Front and 12 flying the Me 262 in the Defence of the Reich. As a ground attack pilot, he was credited with the destruction of 46 tanks and one armoured train.

=== Aerial victory claims ===
According to US historian David T. Zabecki, Buchner was credited with 58 aerial victories. Morgan and Weal also list him with 58 aerial victories, 12 of which flying the Me 262 jet. Mathews and Foreman, authors of Luftwaffe Aces — Biographies and Victory Claims, researched the German Federal Archives state that he claimed 58 aerial victories. This figure includes 45 claims on the Eastern Front and 13 claims on the Western Front. Buchner claimed 12 victories flying the Me 262 including more than ten four-engined bombers.

Chronicle of aerial victories
This and the ? (question mark) indicates information discrepancies listed by Boehme, Mathews and Foreman.
Claim	Date	Time	Type	Location	Claim	Date	Time	Type	Location
– 8. Staffel of Schlachtgeschwader 1 – Eastern Front — August 1943
1	9 August 1943	11:30~	Il-2 m.H. (Note: The "m.H." refers to an Ilyushin Il-2 with rear gunner (mit Heckschütze).)	vicinity of Warwarowka	3	29 August 1943	08:40~	Il-2 m.H.	vicinity of Stalino-North
2	9 August 1943	18:10~	Il-2 m.H.	vicinity of Warwarowka					
– 6. Staffel of Schlachtgeschwader 2 – Eastern Front — October 1943 – June 1944
4	21 October 1943	10:00~	R-5		26	7 May 1944	10:40~	Yak-9	vicinity of Chersonesus
5	24 October 1943	12:00	R-5	vicinity of Kirovohrad	27	7 May 1944	10:40~	Yak-9	vicinity of Chersonesus
6	28 October 1943	06:30	Boston	vicinity of Kirovohrad	28	7 May 1944	16:25~	P-39	vicinity of Chersonesus
7	28 October 1943	08:35	U-2	vicinity of Kirovohrad	29	7 May 1944	16:25~	Yak-9	vicinity of Chersonesus
8	29 October 1943	15:00	P-39	vicinity of Kirovohrad	30	8 May 1944	18:30~	Yak-9	vicinity of Chersonesus
9	6 November 1943	14:40	Il-2 m.H.		31	9 May 1944	11:10~	Il-2	vicinity of Chersonesus
10	6 November 1943	14:45	Il-2 m.H.		32	9 May 1944	11:10~	Yak-9	vicinity of Chersonesus
11	12 February 1944	08:40	Yak-9		33	9 May 1944	13:15~	Yak-9	vicinity of Chersonesus
12	25 February 1944	11:23	P-39		34	30 May 1944	14:55	Yak-9	
13	2 March 1944	09:40	Yak-9		35	30 May 1944	15:05	Il-2	
14	18 April 1944	13:00~	Il-2	vicinity of Chersonesus	36	30 May 1944	15:08	Il-2	
15	22 April 1944	17:05~	Pe-2	vicinity of Chersonesus	37	31 May 1944	06:40	P-39	
16	22 April 1944	17:00~	Yak-9	vicinity of Chersonesus	38	31 May 1944	14:55	Il-2	
17	23 April 1944	14:10~	Yak-9	vicinity of Chersonesus	39	1 June 1944	13:30	P-39	
18	23 April 1944	14:10~	Il-2	vicinity of Chersonesus	40	4 June 1944	08:55	Yak-9	
19	24 April 1944	15:20~	Il-2	vicinity of Chersonesus	41	4 June 1944	15:00	Il-2	
20	26 April 1944	14:25~	Il-2	vicinity of Chersonesus	42	5 June 1944	13:50	Il-2	
21	5 May 1944	08:10~	Boston	vicinity of Chersonesus	43	5 June 1944	13:53	Il-2	
22	5 May 1944	11:30~	Boston	vicinity of Chersonesus	44	5 June 1944	16:48	Il-2	
23	6 May 1944	11:50~	Il-2	vicinity of Chersonesus	45	5 June 1944	16:50	Il-2	
24	6 May 1944	11:50~	Il-2	vicinity of Chersonesus	46	23 June 1944	09:50	B-17	vicinity of Bucharest
25	6 May 1944	16:00~	Yak-9	vicinity of Chersonesus					
– 9. Staffel of Jagdgeschwader 7 – Defense of the Reich — November 1944 – February 1945
47	26 November 1944	12:15	P-38	vicinity of Spessart	48	22 February 1945	12:20~	P-51	vicinity of Stendal
– 10. Staffel of Jagdgeschwader 7 – Defense of the Reich — March – April 1945
49	20 March 1945	12:15	B-17? (Note: According to Boehme, Buchner claimed to have damaged a B-17.)	northwest of Hamburg	51	25 March 1945	—	B-24	
50	22 March 1945	—	B-17		52	31 March 1945	—	Lancaster	

=== Awards ===
- Honor Goblet of the Luftwaffe (Ehrenpokal der Luftwaffe) on 5 October 1942 as Feldwebel and pilot (Note: According to Obermaier on 2 October 1942.)
- Front Flying Clasp of the Luftwaffe in Gold
- Iron Cross (1939) 2nd and 1st Class
- German Cross in Gold on 17 October 1943 as Feldwebel in the 6./Schlachtgeschwader 1
- Knight's Cross of the Iron Cross on 20 July 1944 as Oberfeldwebel and pilot in the 6./Schlachtgeschwader 2 "Immelmann" (Note: According to Scherzer in the II./SG 2 "Immmelmann")
- Silver and Gold Decoration for Services to the Republic of Austria

Hermann Buchner had been nominated for the Knight's Cross of the Iron Cross with Oak Leaves. The nomination was not processed before the end of World War II in Europe.
