= Priluzhny =

Priluzhny Прилужный
- Khutor
- Location within Voronezh Oblast Location within Russia
- Coordinates: 51°10′N 38°39′E
- Country: Russia
- Region: Voronezh Oblast
- District: Repyovsky District
- Time zone: UTC+3:00

Priluzhny (Russian: Прилужный) is a rural locality (a khutor) in Osadchevskoye Rural Settlement, Repyovsky District, Voronezh Oblast, Russia. The population was 195 as of 2010.

== Geography ==
Priluzhny is located 14 km north of Repyovka (the district's administrative centre) by road. Osadcheye is the nearest rural locality.
