= Kolbino, Voronezh Oblast =

Kolbino Колбино
- Selo
- Location within Voronezh Oblast Location within Russia
- Coordinates: 51°02′N 38°54′E
- Country: Russia
- Region: Voronezh Oblast
- District: Repyovsky District
- Time zone: UTC+3:00

Kolbino (Russian: Колбино) is a rural locality (a selo) and the administrative center of Kolbinskoye Rural Settlement, Repyovsky District, Voronezh Oblast, Russia. The population was 635 as of 2010. There are 5 streets.

== Geography ==
Kolbino is located 23 km east of Repyovka (the district's administrative centre) by road. Prilepy is the nearest rural locality.
