= Rossoshki =

Rossoshki Россошки
- Selo
- Location within Voronezh Oblast Location within Russia
- Coordinates: 51°13′N 38°55′E
- Country: Russia
- Region: Voronezh Oblast
- District: Repyovsky District
- Time zone: UTC+3:00

Rossoshki (Russian: Россошки) is a rural locality (a selo) and the administrative center of Rossoshkinskoye Rural Settlement, Repyovsky District, Voronezh Oblast, Russia. The population was 540 as of 2010. There are 12 streets.

== Geography ==
Rossoshki is located 34 km northeast of Repyovka (the district's administrative centre) by road. Buzenki is the nearest rural locality.
