= Ust-Muravlyanka =

Ust-Muravlyanka Усть-Муравлянка
- Selo
- Location within Voronezh Oblast Location within Russia
- Coordinates: 51°02′N 38°50′E
- Country: Russia
- Region: Voronezh Oblast
- District: Repyovsky District
- Time zone: UTC+3:00

Ust-Muravlyanka (Russian: Усть-Муравлянка) is a rural locality (a selo) and the administrative center of Skoritskoye Rural Settlement, Repyovsky District, Voronezh Oblast, Russia. The population was 858 as of 2010. There are 8 streets.

== Geography ==
Ust-Muravlyanka is located 18 km southeast of Repyovka (the district's administrative centre) by road. Kolbino is the nearest rural locality.
