= Novosoldatka, Voronezh Oblast =

Novosoldatka Новосолдатка
- Selo
- Location within Voronezh Oblast Location within Russia
- Coordinates: 51°14′N 38°48′E
- Country: Russia
- Region: Voronezh Oblast
- District: Repyovsky District
- Time zone: UTC+3:00

Novosoldatka (Russian: Новосолдатка) is a rural locality (a selo) and the administrative center of Novosoldatskoye Rural Settlement, Repyovsky District, Voronezh Oblast, Russia. The population was 849 as of 2010. There are 14 streets.

== Geography ==
Novosoldatka is located 24 km northeast of Repyovka (the district's administrative centre) by road. Krasnolipye is the nearest rural locality.
