= Georg Dörffel =

German pilot during WWII

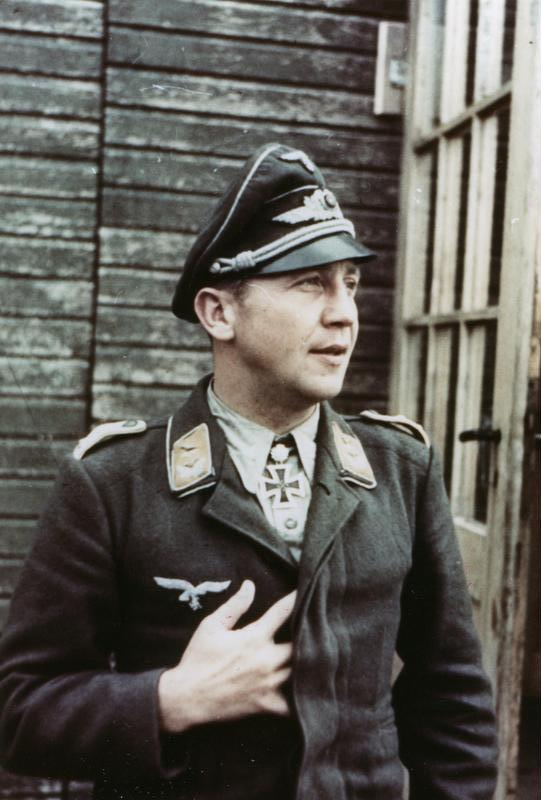
- Georg Dörffel
- Born: 27 July 1914; Rengersdorf
- Died: 26 May 1944 (aged 29); Rome
- Military career
- Allegiance: Nazi Germany
- Branch: Luftwaffe
- Service years: 1933–44
- Rank: Oberstleutnant (Posthumously)
- Commands: SG 4
- Conflicts: World War II: Invasion of Poland; Battle of France; Battle of Britain; Balkans Campaign; Battle of Greece; Operation Barbarossa; Battle of Białystok–Minsk; Siege of Leningrad; Battle of Kursk; Italian Campaign †
- Awards: Knight's Cross of the Iron Cross with Oak Leaves

Georg Dörffel (27 July 1914 – 26 May 1944) was a highly decorated Oberstleutnant in the Luftwaffe during World War II, and one of only 882 recipients of the Knight's Cross of the Iron Cross with Oak Leaves. Georg Dörffel was killed on 26 May 1944, north of Rome. During his career he flew 1004 missions as a ground assault pilot. He was posthumously promoted to Oberstleutnant.

== Career ==
Georg Dörffel joined the military service in Infanterie-Regiment 22 (22nd infantry regiment) in 1933. In 1935 he transferred to the Luftwaffe holding the rank of Oberfähnrich (senior officer candidate). At first he served as an observer in a Kampfgeschwader (bomber wing) before transferring as to the 5.(Schlacht)/Lehrgeschwader 2 (5.(S)/LG 2—5th ground attack squadron of the 2nd demonstration wing) flying the Henschel Hs 123 ground attack aircraft.

With this squadron as part of the II.(Schlacht)/LG 2 (2nd ground attack group of the 2nd demonstration wing) he flew as a Leutnant (Second Lieutenant) and pilot during the Invasion of Poland and Battle of France. The group was responsible of repelling a large enemy tank formation north of Cambrai on 17 May 1940 which threatened the flank of the German advance. Dörffel received the Iron Cross 2nd and 1st Class for this action on 21 May 1940.

Dörffel was shot down twice during the campaign in the west, the first time on 14 May 1940 near Tirlemont, Belgium and in June 1940 near Dunkirk. He was wounded on both occasions. In October 1940 he was appointed Staffelkapitän (squadron leader) of the 5.(S)/LG 2, which was re-designated 5./Schlachtgeschwader 1 (5th squadron of the 1st ground attack wing) in early 1942. In this role and position he flew in the Battle of Britain and from April 1941 in the Balkans Campaign.

With the beginning of Operation Barbarossa, the German invasion of the Soviet Union in June 1941, Dörffel was transferred to the Eastern Front, particularly in support of the central and southern sectors, providing air support to the German ground forces. Together with the squadron leader of the 2.(S)/LG 2, Oberleutnant Alfred Druschel, he was awarded the Knight's Cross of the Iron Cross on 21 August 1941 after over 200 combat missions. He was shot down near Skvorin at the Don River on 1 July 1942. Dörffel flew his 600th combat mission on 16 August 1942. He was appointed acting Gruppenkommandeur (group commander) of the I./SG 1 (1st group of the 1st ground attack wing) on 2 March 1943 followed by his official appointment as group leader on 11 June 1943.

Dörffel flew his 800th mission of the war in July 1943 followed by his 900th mission one month later. He was promoted to Major on 1 September 1943. In early October 1943 he flew 19 combat missions on one day against the attacking Red Army forces crossing the Dnieper River near Kiev. He flew his 1,000th combat mission of the war on 6 October 1943, claiming his 30th aerial victory on that flight. He was grounded one day later and transferred and appointed commander of the Schlachtfliegerschule (ground attack fliers school) at Prossnitz. In early May 1944 he took command of Schlachtgeschwader 4 (SG 4—4th ground attack wing) stationed in Italy as Geschwaderkommodore (wing commander).

Georg Dörffel was killed in action on 26 May 1944 north-west of Rome, Italy. Dörffel was forced to bail out of his Focke-Wulf Fw 190 F-8 (Werknummer—factory number—580 464) following an attack on a four-engined bomber formation. He probably struck his head on the tailplane; his parachute failed to open. He was buried in Pomezia, Italy, and posthumously promoted to Oberstleutnant (Lieutenant Colonel).

== Awards and decorations ==
- Aviator badge
- Front Flying Clasp of the Luftwaffe in Gold with Pennant "1000"
- Ehrenpokal der Luftwaffe (17 November 1941)
- Iron Cross (1939)
  - 2nd Class (21 May 1940)
  - 1st Class (21 May 1940)
- Wound Badge (1939)
  - in Black
- Eastern Front Medal
- German Cross in Gold on 24 January 1942 as Oberleutnant in the 5./Lehrgeschwader 2
- Knight's Cross of the Iron Cross with Oak Leaves
  - Knight's Cross on 21 August 1941 as Oberleutnant and Staffelkapitän of the 5.(S)/Lehrgeschwader 2
  - 231st Oak Leaves on 14 April 1943 as Hauptmann and acting Gruppenkommandeur of the I./Schlachtgeschwader 1

== Notes ==
Military offices
Preceded by Major Alfred Druschel	Commander of I. Schlachtgeschwader 1 March 1943 – September 1943	Succeeded by Hauptmann Siegfried Steinhof
Preceded by formed from Stab/Schlachtgeschwader 2	Commander of Schlachtgeschwader 4; 18 October 1943 – 26 May 1944	Succeeded by Major Ewald Janssen
