= Krasnolipye =

Krasnolipye Краснолипье
- Selo
- Location within Voronezh Oblast Location within Russia
- Coordinates: 51°12′N 38°45′E
- Country: Russia
- Region: Voronezh Oblast
- District: Repyovsky District
- Time zone: UTC+3:00

Krasnolipye (Russian: Краснолипье) is a rural locality (a selo) and the administrative center of Krasnolipyevskoye Rural Settlement, Repyovsky District, Voronezh Oblast, Russia. The population was 1,539 as of 2010. There are 13 streets.

== Geography ==
Krasnolipye is located 18 km northeast of Repyovka (the district's administrative centre) by road. Novosoldatka is the nearest rural locality.
