= Platava =

Platava Платава
- Selo
- Location within Voronezh Oblast Location within Russia
- Coordinates: 51°10′N 38°54′E
- Country: Russia
- Region: Voronezh Oblast
- District: Repyovsky District
- Time zone: UTC+3:00

Platava (Russian: Платава) is a rural locality (a selo) and the administrative center of Platavskoye Rural Settlement, Repyovsky District, Voronezh Oblast, Russia. The population was 972 as of 2010. There are 10 streets.

== Geography ==
Platava is located 36 km northeast of Repyovka (the district's administrative centre) by road. Rossoshki is the nearest rural locality.
