= Skoritskoye =

Skoritskoye Скорицкое
- Selo
- Location within Voronezh Oblast Location within Russia
- Coordinates: 51°08′N 38°48′E
- Country: Russia
- Region: Voronezh Oblast
- District: Repyovsky District
- Time zone: UTC+3:00

Skoritskoye (Russian: Скорицкое) is a rural locality (a selo) in Skoritskoye Rural Settlement, Repyovsky District, Voronezh Oblast, Russia. The population was 125 as of 2010. There are 2 streets.

== Geography ==
Skoritskoye is located 23 km northeast of Repyovka (the district's administrative centre) by road. Prudovy is the nearest rural locality.
