= Butyrki, Voronezh Oblast =

Butyrki Бутырки
- Selo
- Location within Voronezh Oblast Location within Russia
- Coordinates: 51°03′N 38°37′E
- Country: Russia
- Region: Voronezh Oblast
- District: Repyovsky District
- Time zone: UTC+3:00

Butyrki (Russian: Бутырки) is a rural locality (a selo) and the administrative center of Butyrskoye Rural Settlement, Repyovsky District, Voronezh Oblast, Russia. The population was 1,103 as of 2010. There are 12 streets.

== Geography ==
Butyrki is located 3 km southwest of Repyovka (the district's administrative centre) by road. Repyovka is the nearest rural locality.
