= Drakino, Repyovsky District, Voronezh Oblast =

Drakino Дракино
- Khutor
- Location within Voronezh Oblast Location within Russia
- Coordinates: 51°05′N 38°34′E
- Country: Russia
- Region: Voronezh Oblast
- District: Repyovsky District
- Time zone: UTC+3:00

Drakino (Russian: Дракино) is a rural locality (a khutor) in Repyovskoye Rural Settlement, Repyovsky District, Voronezh Oblast, Russia. The population was 131 as of 2010.

== Geography ==
Drakino is located 6 km northwest of Repyovka (the district's administrative centre) by road. Repyovka is the nearest rural locality.
