= Rossosh, Repyovsky District, Voronezh Oblast =

Rossosh Россошь
- Selo
- Location within Voronezh Oblast Location within Russia
- Coordinates: 51°06′N 38°30′E
- Country: Russia
- Region: Voronezh Oblast
- District: Repyovsky District
- Time zone: UTC+3:00

Rossosh (Russian: Ро́ссошь) is a rural locality (a selo) and the administrative center of Rossoshanskoye Rural Settlement, Repyovsky District, Voronezh Oblast, Russia. The population was 858 as of 2010. There are 10 streets.

== Geography ==
Rossosh is located 21 km northwest of Repyovka (the district's administrative centre) by road. Zarosly is the nearest rural locality.
