= Hermann Buchner =

Hermann Buchner may refer to:

- Hermann Buchner (pilot) (1919–2005), former German Luftwaffe fighter ace
- Hermann Buchner (soldier) (1917–1944), recipient of the Knight's Cross of the Iron Cross
