= Rossosh =

Rossosh (Russian: Россошь) is the name of several inhabited localities in Russia.

Urban localities

- Rossosh, Rossoshansky District, Voronezh Oblast, a town in Rossoshansky District of Voronezh Oblast

Rural localities

- Rossosh, Belgorod Oblast, a khutor in Veydelevsky District of Belgorod Oblast
- Rossosh, Kasharsky District, Rostov Oblast, a selo in Pervomayskoye Rural Settlement of Kasharsky District in Rostov Oblast
- Rossosh, Tarasovsky District, Rostov Oblast, a khutor in Tarasovskoye Rural Settlement of Tarasovsky District in Rostov Oblast
- Rossosh, Repyovsky District, Voronezh Oblast, a selo in Rossoshanskoye Rural Settlement of Repyovsky District in Voronezh Oblast
