= Robert Stein (explorer) =

German explorer

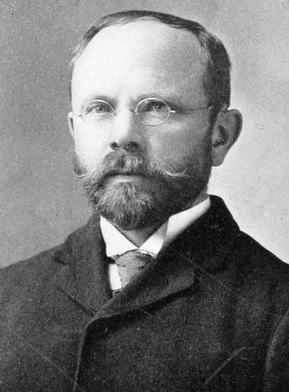
- Born: January 9, 1857; Rengersdorf, Silesia, Prussia
- Died: April 21, 1917 (aged 60); Washington, D.C., U.S.
- Education: Georgetown University (MD)
- Occupations: Arctic explorer, translator
- Employer: United States Geological Survey

Robert Stein (January 9, 1857 – April 21, 1917) was a German-American translator, interpreter of Eskimo–Aleut languages, and amateur Arctic explorer whose contributions in the field of Arctic research were largely ineffectual.

== Early life ==
Stein was born on January 9, 1857, in Rengersdorf, Silesia. He moved to the United States in 1875, and began his studies intent on going into the clergy. He graduated from Georgetown University with an MD in 1866, but appears never to have practised medicine afterward.

In 1892, he and his brother Richard bought land in Maryland, including Harmony Hall. This spawned a small settlement in Prince George's County, Maryland, also called "Silesia", with a population today of around 40 people.

== Arctic interest ==
Stein worked as clerk and stenographer for the United States Geological Survey from 1885 until 1905, occasionally translating scientific literature into English on a freelance basis. He also became an active member of the newly formed National Geographic Society in Washington, D.C., translating articles for its magazine and presenting papers at its meetings. During this time he developed an "all-absorbing fascination for Arctic exploration".

He participated in several Arctic expeditions, and was an interpreter of Eskimo languages for Admiral Robert Edwin Peary. He wrote a proposal for an expedition in 1894 to explore Ellesmere Island and rescue the lost Björling–Kallstenius Expedition.

While it is unclear if his proposed expedition ever took place, he did manage to finance another expedition after mortgaging his house and farm. Stein landed near Cape Sabine and commenced a two-year study of the linguistics, songs, and drum dances of the Cape York Eskimo from 1899 to 1901, overwintering at Fort Magnesia on Pim Island.

Ultimately the expedition was eclipsed by the better funded and equipped expedition led by Otto Sverdrup. Historian William Barr rates Stein's expedition "among one of the least effectual which had ever crossed the Arctic Circle."

== Later life and death ==
Stein would later propose a claim to reduce pre-war tensions through a vast exchange of colonies and hinterlands, notably involving ceding Greenland to Canada.

Depressed by the First World War and pessimistic about future world peace, Stein hanged himself on April 21, 1917. He was cremated and his ashes were scattered on the family's land in Maryland.
