= Otto Weiß (pilot) =

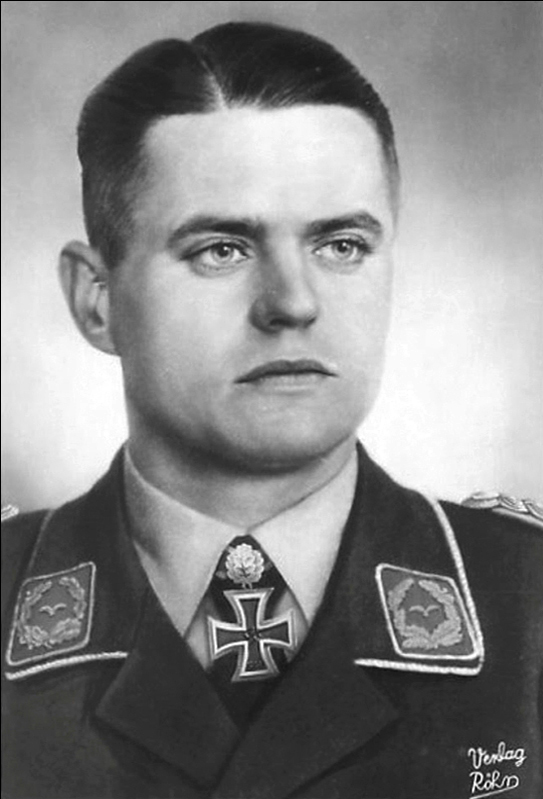
- Otto Weiß
- Born: 25 September 1907; Breslau, German Empire
- Died: 19 August 1955 (aged 47); Kiel, West Germany
- Military career
- Allegiance: Weimar Republic (to 1933); Nazi Germany
- Branch: Polizei; Luftwaffe
- Service years: 1926–45
- Rank: Oberst
- Nickname: Lion of Kalinin
- Units: JG 134, LG 2, Luftflotte 6
- Commands: SG 1
- Conflicts: World War II: Invasion of Poland; Battle of France; Eastern Front
- Awards: Knight's Cross of the Iron Cross with Oak Leaves

Otto Albert Bernhard Weiß (Note: His name, in German, is spelled with a "sharp S"; see ß.) (25 September 1907 – 19 August 1955) was a World War II Luftwaffe attack aircraft pilot and recipient of the Knight's Cross of the Iron Cross with Oak Leaves. He was the first attack aircraft pilot so honored. Weiß flew more than 500 combat missions with the Henschel Hs 123 and the Messerschmitt Bf 109.

== Early and career ==
Weiß was born on 25 September 1907 in Breslau—today Wrocław in Poland—at the time a Silesian Province of the Kingdom of Prussia. He joined the police force (Polizei) of the Weimar Republic on 15 April 1926 at police school in Frankenstein in Schlesien and was promoted to Polizei-Leutnant in 1931. He transferred to the Deutsche Verkehrsfliegerschule (German Air Transport School) in Braunschweig for pilot training on 1 March 1933. Weiß transferred to the Luftwaffe on 1 October 1934 holding the rank of Oberleutnant where he initially served as a technical officer with a reconnaissance squadron. From October 1936 to July 1938, now a Hauptmann (Captain), he served on the Stab of Jagdgeschwader 134 "Horst Wessel" (JG 134—134th Fighter Wing). (Note: For an explanation of Luftwaffe unit designations see Organisation of the Luftwaffe during World War II.) In July 1938 he was appointed Staffelkapitän (Squadron Commander) of the Fliegergruppe 40 (40th Flyers Group) which was later renamed to II.(S)/Lehrgeschwader 2 (II.(S)/LG 2—2nd Group (Ground Attack) of the 2nd Demonstration Wing).

== World War II ==
Shortly after the outbreak of World War II, on 1 September 1939, during the Invasion of Poland, he took command on the II.(S)/LG 2 following the death of its commander, Major Georg Spielvogel. For his services during the Polish Campaign he received both classes of the Iron Cross. During the Battle of France in 1940 as part of the VIII. Fliegerkorps (8th Air Corps), he supported the German advance of the 6th Army in its crossing of the Meuse river and successfully supported the repulse of a French armoured attack south-east of Cambrai. Weiß and his group were stationed roughly 6 kilometres (3.7 mi) north of Cambrai at the time. A German reconnaissance aircraft, a Heinkel He 46, had spotted a French armoured column of 50 tanks supported by 150 trucks and infantry on the advance. Weiß organized the defense and led the attack from his Henschel Hs 123 ground attack aircraft. He had also informed the neighbouring fighter pilot group I./Jagdgeschwader 21 (JG 21—21st Fighter Wing) under the command of Hauptmann Fritz Ultsch. The two groups were further supported by anti-aircraft artillery from I./Flak-Regiment 33. The combined German units under Weiß's leadership were credited with the destruction of 40 French tanks. For these achievements in the Battle of Montcornet, he was awarded the Knight's Cross of the Iron Cross on 18 May 1940, the first attack aircraft pilot so honored. On 1 July 1940 Weiß was promoted to Major.

Following the conversion to the Messerschmitt Bf 109 at Braunschweig-Waggum, the Gruppe was tasked to attack various targets in Southern England during the Battle of Britain. The Gruppe was augmented again in early 1941 with a Staffel of Hs 123 ground attack aircraft. In the Invasion of Yugoslavia in April 1941, II.(S)/LG 2 was deployed with two squadrons Bf 109 and one squadron Hs 123. With the start of Operation Barbarossa, the German invasion of the Soviet Union in June 1941, the Gruppe, consisting of three squadrons Bf 109 and one Hs 123, was again subordinated to the VIII. Fliegerkorps and fought in the central sector of the Eastern Front. In January 1942 the II(S)./LG 2 was re-designated and became the core of Schlachtgeschwader 1 (SG 1—1st Ground Attack Wing). Otto Weiß was appointed its first Geschwaderkommodore (Wing Commander).

Otto Weiß surrendered command of SG 1 to Hubertus Hitschhold on 18 June 1942. He was then tasked with experimenting with anti-tank warfare from the air. An experimental unit dubbed Versuchskommando für Panzerbekämpfung (experimental commando for anti-tank combat) was founded at Rechlin experimenting with the Junkers Ju 87 and Henschel Hs 129 in an anti-tank role. Weiß was promoted to Oberst (Colonel) on 1 November 1943 and served in the staff of Luftflotte 6 (Air Fleet 6) until the end of World War II. He died following a lengthy illness on 19 August 1955 at the age of 47 in Kiel, West Germany.

== Awards ==
- Iron Cross (1939)
  - 2nd Class (13 September 1939) (Note: According to Brütting on 15 September 1939.)
  - 1st Class (30 September 1939) (Note: According to Brütting on 2 October 1939.)
- Knight's Cross of the Iron Cross with Oak Leaves
  - Knight's Cross on 18 May 1940 as Hauptmann and Gruppenkommandeur of the II.(S)/LG 2
  - Oak Leaves on 31 December 1941 as Major and Gruppenkommandeur of the II.(S)/LG 2

== Notes ==
Military offices
Preceded by none	Commander of Schlachtgeschwader 1 January 1942 – 18 June 1942	Succeeded by Oberleutnant Hubertus Hitschhold
