= Harmony Hall (Fort Washington, Maryland) =

Historic house in Maryland, United States

- U.S. National Register of Historic Places
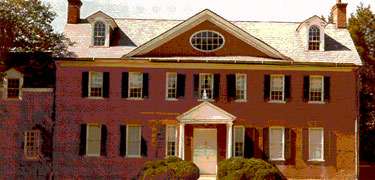
- Harmony Hall, Fort Washington, Maryland

- Location within Maryland Location within the United States
- Location: 10711 Livingston Rd., Fort Washington, Maryland
- Coordinates: 38°44′45″N 77°0′11″W
- Built: c. 1769
- Architectural style: Georgian
- NRHP reference No.: 80000673
- Added to NRHP: June 06, 1980

Harmony Hall, located in Fort Washington, Maryland, is managed by the United States National Park Service as part of the National Capital Parks-East system. It has been a National Park Service site since 1966. Harmony Hall is a 2 1/2-story Georgian country house built of red brick during the eighteenth century. It is surrounded by 65 acres (26 ha) of land on Broad Creek, a Potomac River tributary.

The house was built circa 1769 by Enoch Magruder. After his death, the estate was given to his daughter, Sarah and her husband, Col. William Lyles. The estate was originally called Battersea, but came to be called Harmony Hall some time after 1792, when it was rented to brothers John and Walter Dulaney Addison and their wives. The name "Harmony Hall" commemorates the two couples' harmonious coexistence. Harmony Hall was sold by the Lyles family in 1850. After passing through other owners, the manor was purchased in about 1892 by Robert Stein, his brother Richard, and brother-in-law Joseph Adler. The three had emigrated from Silesia, and engaged in truck farming nearby. They lost control of the manor house in 1929, selling it to Charles Collins, but continued to farm and operate a general store in the area.

The home was extensively restored beginning in 1927 by Charles Wallace Collins (1879–1964), a lawyer, writer, and librarian who made his home in Harmony Hall and devoted himself to its restoration after he retired. Collins bequeathed the house to the National Park Service.

Beginning in 1985, Frank Calhoun leased the mansion and lived there, investing more than $1 million into the house and its upkeep. After he fell behind on renovations in his early 60s, the Park Service asked Calhoun to leave in 1999. The property has been empty and in accelerating decline since then. Though the Park Service periodically sends in staff and enlists students to clean up the grounds, Harmony Hall competes with many other historic properties for attention and funding.

The home has been listed on the National Register of Historic Places since 1980, at which time its condition was described as "excellent". As of January 2010, Harmony Hall is closed to the public.

Harmony Hall is also the name given to a community center building, on adjacent property, owned by the Maryland-National Capital Park and Planning Commission and used as their southern area headquarters office. The center includes a fitness center and hosts concerts, stage plays, art exhibits, arts classes, scout meetings, and other cultural programs. The building was originally an elementary school.
