= Krosnowice =

- Village
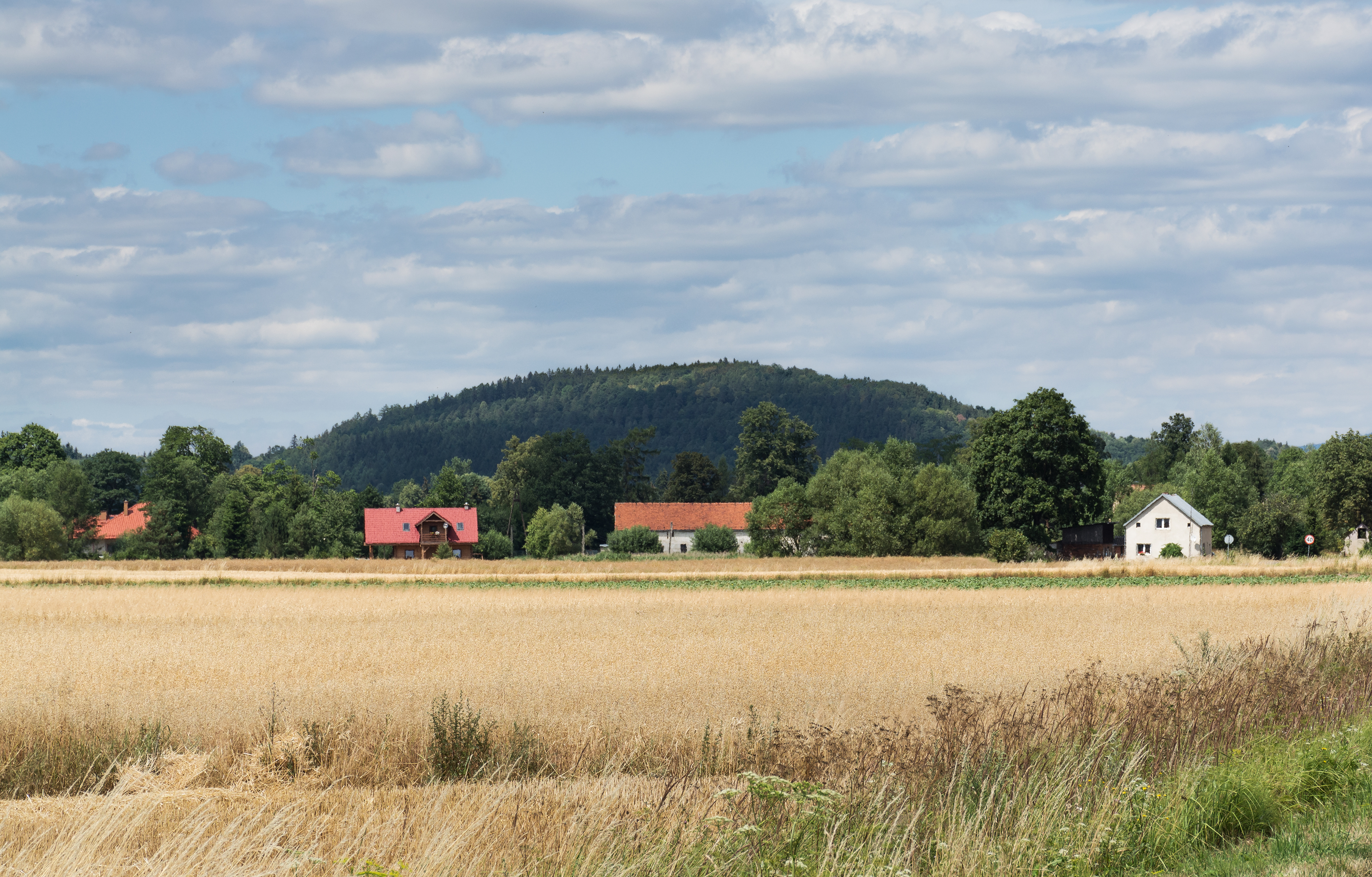

- Location within Poland
- Coordinates: 50°23′13″N 16°38′0″E
- Country: Poland
- Voivodeship: Lower Silesian
- County: Kłodzko
- Gmina: Kłodzko
- Population: 2,954

Krosnowice [krɔsnɔˈvit͡sɛ] (formerly Rankowo) is a village in the administrative district of Gmina Kłodzko, within Kłodzko County, Lower Silesian Voivodeship, in south-western Poland.

== Notable residents ==
- Dieter Damerius (born 1924), Wehrmacht officer
- Georg Dörffel (1914–1944), Luftwaffe officer
- Robert Stein (1857-1917), Arctic explorer and translator of local native languages
