= Khotynets =

Khotynets (Russian: Хотынец) is the name of several inhabited localities in Khotynetsky District of Oryol Oblast, Russia.

Urban localities

- Khotynets, Khotynetsky District, Oryol Oblast, an urban-type settlement

Rural localities

- Khotynets, Abolmasovsky Selsoviet, Khotynetsky District, Oryol Oblast, a selo in Abolmasovsky Selsoviet
