= Drakino, Liskinsky District, Voronezh Oblast =

Rural locality in Liskinsky District, Voronezh Oblast, Russia

Coordinates: 51°08′27″N 39°24′32″E

Drakino (Russian: Дракино) is a rural locality (a selo) in Liskinsky District of Voronezh Oblast, Russia.

Population: 3,253 (2010 census); 3,114 (2002 census).
