= Martovka =

Martovka Мартовка
- Selo
- Location within Altai Krai Location within Russia
- Coordinates: 53°26′N 79°31′E
- Country: Russia
- Region: Altai Krai
- District: Khabarsky District
- Time zone: UTC+7:00

Martovka (Russian: Мартовка) is a rural locality (a selo) and the administrative center of Martovsky Selsoviet, Khabarsky District, Altai Krai, Russia. The population was 877 as of 2013. It was founded in 1920. There are 5 streets.

== Geography ==
Martovka is located 24 km south of Khabary (the district's administrative centre) by road. Malopavlovka is the nearest rural locality.
