= Skvorin =

Skvorin Скворин
- Khutor
- Location within Volgograd Oblast Location within Russia
- Coordinates: 48°49′N 43°14′E
- Country: Russia
- Region: Volgograd Oblast
- District: Surovikinsky District
- Time zone: UTC+4:00

Skvorin (Russian: Скворин) is a rural locality (a khutor) in Kachalinskoye Rural Settlement, Surovikinsky District, Volgograd Oblast, Russia. The population was 97 as of 2010. There are 3 streets.

== Geography ==
Skvorin is located 47 km northeast of Surovikino (the district's administrative centre) by road. Kachalin is the nearest rural locality.
