= Nogent =

Nogent is the name or part of the name of several communes in France:

- Nogent, Haute-Marne, in the Haute-Marne département
- Nogent-l'Abbesse, in the Marne département
- Nogent-l'Artaud, in the Aisne département
- Nogent-sur-Aube, in the Aube département
- Nogent-le-Bernard, in the Sarthe département
- Nogent-sur-Eure, in the Eure département
- Nogent-sur-Loir, in the Sarthe département
- Nogent-sur-Marne, in the Val-de-Marne département
- Nogent-lès-Montbard, in the Côte-d'Or département
- Nogent-sur-Oise, in the Oise département
- Nogent-en-Othe, in the Aube département
- Nogent-le-Rotrou, in the Eure-et-Loir département
- Nogent-le-Roi, in the Eure-et-Loir département
- Nogent-le-Sec, in the Eure département
- Nogent-le-Phaye, in the Eure-et-Loir département
- Nogent-sur-Seine, in the Aube département
- Nogent-sur-Vernisson, in the Loiret département

== See also ==
- Nogent Nuclear Power Plant, Nogent-sur-Seine
