= Alfred Druschel =

German World War II flying ace (1917–1945)

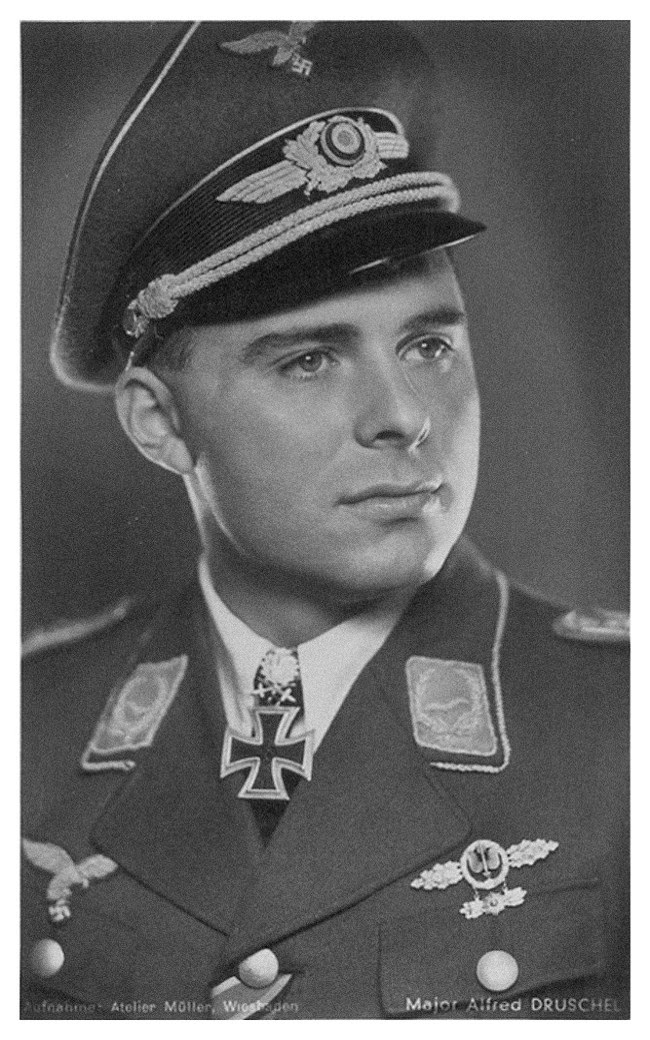
- Born: 4 February 1917; Bindsachsen, District Büdingen
- Died: 1 January 1945 (aged 27) (MIA) disappeared south of Aachen
- Military career
- Allegiance: Nazi Germany
- Branch: Luftwaffe
- Service years: 1936–45
- Rank: Oberst
- Units: LG 2, Schl.G. 1, SG 4
- Commands: 4.(Schl)/LG 2, 1./Schl.G. 1, I./Schl.G. 1, Schl.G. 1, SG 4
- Conflicts: World War II: Invasion of Poland; Battle of France; Battle of Britain; Battle of Greece; Eastern Front; Unternehmen Bodenplatte (MIA)
- Awards: Knight's Cross of the Iron Cross with Oak Leaves and Swords

Alfred Druschel (4 February 1917 – missing in action 1 January 1945) was a German Luftwaffe combat pilot during World War II. He was a recipient of the Knight's Cross of the Iron Cross with Oak Leaves and Swords of Nazi Germany.

== Military career ==
Alfred Druschel joined the Luftwaffe on 1 April 1936. He trained as pilot, observer and then as Luftflotte staff officer. In August 1938, Druschel was posted to Fliegergruppe 20, which, after combination with Fliegergruppe 40 was renamed II.(Schl)/Lehrgeschwader 2 (LG 2) on 1 November 1938.

Druschel served with 4.(Schl)/LG 2 during the invasion of Poland and the battle of France, flying the Henschel Hs 123 biplane. During the battle of Britain, he became Staffelkapitän of 4.(Schl)/LG 2 in September 1940, and, flying the Bf 109E, led the unit on fighter-bomber missions against targets in England and shipping in the Channel.

In April 1941, 4.(Schl)/LG 2 operated over southern Yugoslavia and Greece, and from 21 June 1941 the unit took part in the invasion of the Soviet Union.

When on 13 January 1942 II.(Schl)/LG 2 was renamed to I./Schlachtgeschwader 1 (Schl.G.1), Druschel was promoted to Gruppenkommandeur and in June 1943 to Geschwaderkommodore of Schl.G.1. Hauptmann Druschel was awarded the Oakleaves in September 1942 for 600 combat missions and the Swords in February 1943 for over 800 combat missions. He operated over the Eastern Front until October 1943.

On 18 October 1943 I./Sch.G.1 was disbanded and reformed as II./Schlachtgeschwader 77 (II./SG 77). At this moment Druschel left active flying service and was appointed Inspizient der Tag-Schlachtfliegerverbände (supervisor of the day-ground attack air units).

In December 1944 he reentered combat service and was appointed Geschwaderkommodore of Schlachtgeschwader 4 (SG 4) based in the west.

On 1 January 1945, Druschel participated in Unternehmen Bodenplatte, the attack on the Allied airfields in the Netherlands and Belgium. Accompanied by Jagdgeschwader 2 (JG 2), SG 4 commanded by Druschel led an attack on St Trond in Belgium. He became separated from his formation following a heavy flak attack and remains missing to this day in the area south of Aachen.

Alfred Druschel was officially credited with seven aerial victories claimed in over 800 combat missions. He mainly flew ground support missions in Henschel Hs 123, Bf 109E and Fw 190 fighter-bombers.

Druschel's brother Kurt, Oberleutnant Leitender Ingenieur (chief engineer) on U-154, was a key witness in the court martial of Oberleutnant zur See Oskar Kusch. Kusch was sentenced to death for Wehrkraftzersetzung (sedition and defeatism). Kurt was killed in the sinking of U-154 on 3 July 1944.

== Awards ==
- Wound Badge (1939) in Black
- Front Flying Clasp of the Luftwaffe in Gold with Pennant "800"
- Combined Pilots-Observation Badge
- Ehrenpokal der Luftwaffe
- Iron Cross (1939)
  - 2nd Class (27 September 1939) (Note: According to Thomas on 17 September 1939.)
  - 1st Class (21 May 1940) (Note: According to Thomas on 20 May 1940.)
- Knight's Cross of the Iron Cross with Oak Leaves and Swords
  - Knight's Cross on 21 August 1941 as Oberleutnant and Staffelkapitän of the 2.(Schl)/LG 2 (Note: According to Scherzer as Staffelkapitän of 4.(Schl)/Lehrgeschwader 2.)
  - 118th Oak Leaves on 3 September 1942 as Hauptmann and Gruppenkommandeur of I./Schl.G.1 (Note: According to Scherzer as Oberleutnant.)
  - 24th Swords on 19 February 1943 as Hauptmann and Gruppenkommandeur of I./Schl.G.1

== See also ==
- List of people who disappeared

== Notes ==
Military offices
Preceded by Oberstleutnant Hubertus Hitschhold	Commander of Schlachtgeschwader 1 June 1943 – 18 October 1943	Succeeded by none
Preceded by Major Ewald Janssen	Commander of Schlachtgeschwader 4; 28 December 1944 – 1 January 1945	Succeeded by Major Werner Dörnbrack
