= Lehrgeschwader 2 =

Coordinates: 54.0794°N 9.9415°E

- Active: 1938–42
- Country: Nazi Germany
- Branch: Luftwaffe
- Type: Multi-purpose Wing
- Role: Tactical and Direct Ground Support
- Size: Air Force Wing
- Engagements: World War II

Insignia
- Identification symbol: Geschwaderkennung of L2

Lehrgeschwader 2 (LG 2) (Demonstration Wing 2) was a Luftwaffe unit during World War II, operating three fighter, night fighter, reconnaissance and ground support Gruppen (groups).

Lehrgeschwader were in general mixed-formation units tasked with the operational evaluation of new types of aircraft and/or with the development/evaluation of new operational tactics or practices. Each Gruppe within the unit was equipped with a different type of aircraft. Each Gruppe consisted of several Staffeln (squadrons). The Gruppe was identified by Roman numbers (I./LG 2) and the Staffel by Arabic numbers (10./LG 2).

In 1939 Lehrgeschwader 2 thus consisted of a Bf 109 fighter Gruppe (designated I.(J)/LG 2), a Henschel Hs 123 ground assault Gruppe (II.(Schl.)/LG 2), and a reconnaissance Gruppe (III.(Aufkl.)/LG 2).

== History ==
The unit was created to control the Lehrgruppe in the Luftwaffe. Stab and I.(J)/LG 2 was formed on 1 November 1938 in Garz. II.(Schl.)/LG 2 was formed in November 1938 in Tutow near the Baltic coast and III Gruppe at Jüterbog.

11.(Nacht)/LG 2 was a specialist night-fighting unit formed in August 1939 in Greifswald under Oblt. Johannes Steinhoff, with Arado ar 68 & Bf 109-D equipment. In September 1939 the unit moved to Bonn-Hangelar and was redesignated 10.(N)/JG 26.

I.(J)/LG 2 became the new I Gruppe, JG 77 in January 1942.

== Operational history ==
=== I.(Jagd)/LG 2 ===
Formed on 1 October 1937, the unit took part in the Polish Campaign, claiming six kills for three losses from 1–20 September 1939. The unit also participated in the Battle of France and the Battle of Britain. One base in this period was Saint Inglevert, Pas-de-Calais. Its commander Oberlt. Herbert Ihlefeld, was its most successful ace, claiming 24 victories by September 1940 and earning the Ritterkreuz des Eisernen Kreuzes. On 10 August 1940 future ace Hans-Joachim Marseille was assigned to I./LG 2, then based in Calais-Marck and flying sorties against England. The Gruppe claimed 92 victories during the Battle, for 22 aircraft lost and 16 damaged. It lost 10 pilots killed and missing and four as POW.

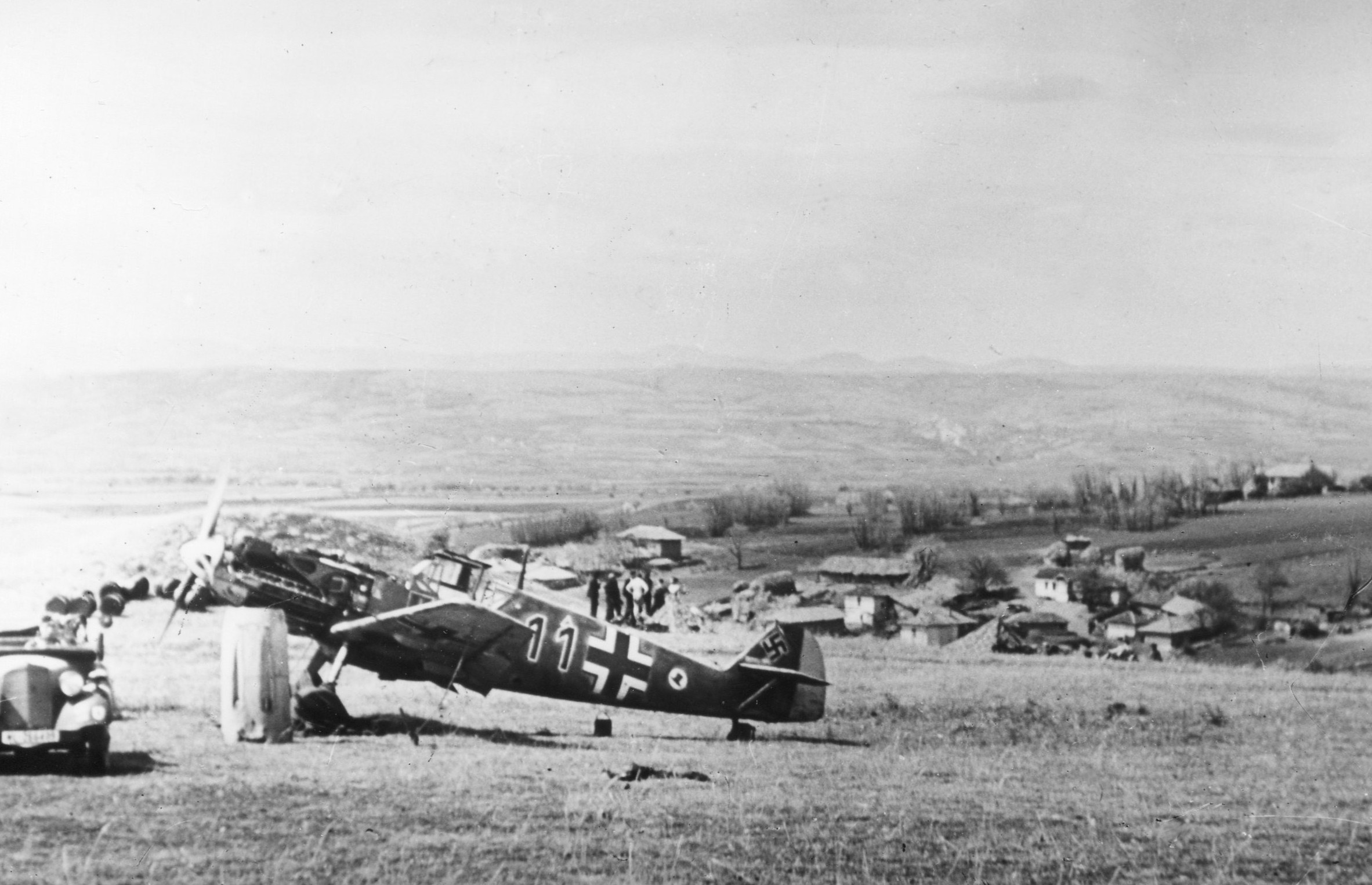
Messerschmitt Bf 109 E-4 or E-4/B, “Black 11”, 2 (J)/LG 2, Vraba-East, Bulgaria, April 1941

I.(J)/LG 2 then participated in the Balkans Campaign. The excellent ground attack work carried out by its sister Gruppe (II./LG 2) had led to several fighter units, including I./LG 2, to also employing a Staffel of Bf 109s converted to fighter-bomber duties. Over Yugoslavia, Leutnant Friedrich Geißhardt was to claim four JKRV Hawker Fury biplanes shot down. Now with 36 victories, Ihlefeld was at this time shot down by ground fire and captured by Yugoslavian soldiers. While in captivity, he was allegedly severely beaten and was threatened with execution by firing squad. Ihlefeld was rescued by German troops after eight days of arrest and returned to Germany to recover. By the end of May 1941, I.(J)/LG 2 was based in Belgrade. The Gruppe lost four aircraft and five damaged and suffered one pilot killed and one captured. During the Battle of Crete two Bf 109's Jabos of I./LG 2 were credited with sinking HMS Fiji with a loss of 276 crew.

Following the successful conclusion of the Balkan campaign with the invasion of Crete the unit was withdrawn to Rumania for Operation Barbarossa. Geisshardt, after 6 victories in the Balkans, was to achieve much success over Russia claiming 28 victories with LG 2 and was awarded the Ritterkreuz in August 1941. The Gruppe scored 52 victories from June - December 1941. Total victories from September 1939 - 13 January 1942 amounted to 583 kills. I Gruppe was redesignated I./JG 77 on 13 January 1942.

=== II.(Schl)./LG 2 ===
This unit was formed as Fliegergruppe 40 on 1 July 1938. During the Polish campaign of September 1939 II.(Schl.)/LG 2 under Major Georg Spielvogel, operated as a 'ground assault' unit in the Luftwaffe, operating the Henschel Hs 123. The unit flew numerous low-level pin-point ground attack operations, and included within their rank as a Staffelkapitän future ace and General der Jagdflieger Oberleutnant Adolf Galland.

Spielvogel was killed by ground fire on 13 September however, and was replaced by Hauptmann Otto Weiß. By the end of the campaign 9 pilots had been killed in action; almost a 25% loss rate for the Gruppe.

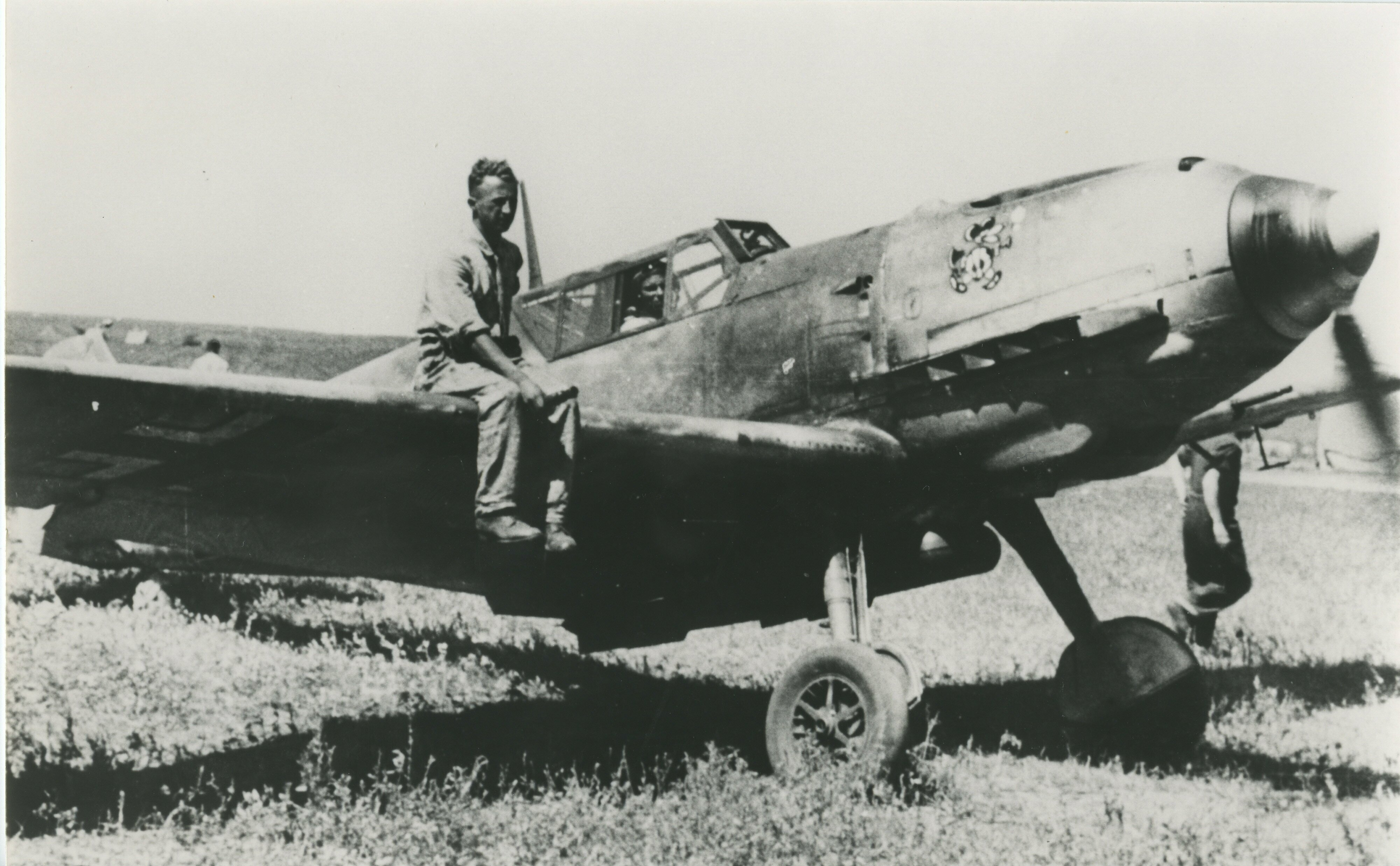
Bf 109E of Lehrgeschwader 2 sometime between 1940 and 1942.

After resting and refitting, II Gruppe went west and took part in the Battle of France. Operating 49 aircraft, the unit initially flew supporting attacks for the German paratroop assault on the Eben-Emael forts in May 1940. Intensive sorties supporting 6th Army's panzer force took up most of May, before switching to harass the retreating French army south of the Somme in June. The outstanding efforts of the Gruppe and its biplanes in what was a unique role for 1940 were recognised with the award of the Ritterkreuz des Eisernen Kreuzes to its commander and all three Staffelkapitäne. The units most notable action took place at the Battle of Arras, during which a strong British armoured attack was repulsed.

II.(Schl)./LG 2 did not take part in the early phases Battle of Britain, and was mooted to convert into a 'true' dive-bomber unit equipped with the Junkers Ju 87. However II Gruppe had proved the viability of the battlefield assault concept enough to be converted to the new Bf 109 E-4B fighter-bomber, with the capability to carry one SC-250 kg bomb or four SC-50 kg bombs. Training took place at Böblingen.

Based at Saint-Omer in France as part of Luftflotte 2, II.(Schl)./LG 2 started operations on 6 September 1940, losing two aircraft to flak over the Thames Estuary. With no direct Army offensive to support, the unit modified its type of operation, and through the winter and into the spring of 1941 kept up a series of sporadic nuisance raids against targets in England, suffering over a dozen aircraft losses.

In March 1941 II Gruppe switched south to the forthcoming Balkans campaign, now equipped with 2 Staffeln of Bf 109s and expanded with two further Staffeln of the older Henschel Hs 123 again.

The unit kept up a constant assault on the retreating Allied armies, supporting 12 Armee and its advance to the Corinth Canal. By now, inspired by the work of II./LG 2, several Jagdeschwader had their own specialist ground-attack cadres of Bf 109 fighter-bombers, including JG 77 and JG 27. The Gruppe were soon on the move back North for the attack on Soviet Russia in June 1941.

Based at Praszniki in Poland near the Lithuanian border, II Gruppe, with 38 (37) Bf 109E and 22(17) Hs 123s, were tasked with attacking their share of the 60 Soviet airfields targeted on the opening day of the offensive, leading to the destruction of over 1,400 Soviet aircraft on the ground. Thereafter they formed part of the air support for Panzergruppe 3 advancing on the 'Central Front'. Featuring in the capture of Minsk in June, by the end of July the intensity of operations had led to an attrition of the Gruppe's available aircraft, culminating in just 14 combat ready aircraft.

II Gruppe were transferred to the Northern sector around Lake Ladoga in August, and its impressive combat record again recognised by the award of Ritterkreuz des Eisernen Kreuzes to its four Staffelkaptäne; Oblts. Georg Dörffel, Werner Dörnbrack, Alfred Druschel and Bruno Meyer. By September the Gruppe was back in the battle in central Russia, participating in the battles at Bryansk and Vyazma and supporting the advance on Kalinin. The II Gruppe Henschel's proved their rugged worth by launching a series of 'shuttle' missions against the counter-attacking Soviet forces in October, saving their own airfield from capture and inflicting heavy losses.

The onset of the appalling winter conditions saw operations curtailed for some time. Thus the II. Gruppe was recalled to Werl in Germany to form the nucleus of the first ever Schlachtgeschwader (SG 1), and with Major Otto Weiß awarded the Oakleaves to the Knight's Cross.

=== Aufklärungsstaffel ===
Created on or just after the 1 October 1936 near Prenzlau. In April 1937, the unit was equipped with the Dornier Do 17 F. It was later merged 1.(F)/Aufklärungsgruppe 122 in September 1937.

=== Stab III.(Aufkl)/ LG 2 ===
Formed on 1 November 1938, it was renamed from Stab/Aufklärungslehrgruppe. The unit was renamed Koluft 10 after mobilisation on 26 August 1939.

=== 9.(H)/LG 2 (Pz) ===
Operated in the Polish Campaign, Battle of France and Battle of Britain. During Operation Barbarossa it supported the 3rd Panzer Divisions capture of Orel and Bryansk, it also supported the German Army during the Battle of Kiev.

=== 10.(See)/LG 2 ===
Formed on 1 November 1938, and dissolved in October 1939. Saw action in the Polish Campaign. The unit was absorbed into Kampfgeschwader 30.

=== 10.(Schlacht)/LG 2 ===
This unit participated in the Balkans Campaign and Operation Barbarossa. It was probably renamed 8.(PZ)SchG1 on 13 January 1942.

=== 11.(Nacht)/LG 2 ===
Formed on 1 August 1939 and experimented with night fighting techniques with Arado Ar 68s. It was used for home defence until 14 December 1939. It was still doing so on 18 February 1940, when it was absorbed into IV.(N)/JG 2.

=== Erg.St.(Sch)/LG 2 ===
Formed on 24 August 1940. Participated in the Battle of Britain, and on the Eastern Front. It was disbanded on 13 January 1942, and its crews helped form II./Sch.G.1 and Erg.J.Gr.Ost.

=== Kunstflugstaffel ===
This unit did not see action. It was formed in early 1938 and dissolved on 3 March 1940.

== Commanding officers ==
=== Geschwaderkommodore ===
- Oberstleutnant Eberhard Baier, 1 November 1938 – 18 November 1939

=== Gruppenkommandeur ===
==== I. (Jagd)/LG 2 ====
- Major Hanns Trübenbach, 1 November 1938 – 18 August 1940
- Hauptmann Bernhard Mielke, 18 August 1940 – 30 August 1940
- Hauptmann Herbert Ihlefeld, 30 August 1940 – 6 January 1942

==== II. (Schlacht)/LG 2 ====
- Major Georg Spielvogel, 1 November 1938 – 9 September 1939
- Major Wolfgang Neudörffer, September 1939 – 1 December 1939
- Hauptmann Otto Weiß, 1 December 1939 – 13 January 1942

==== III. (Aufkl.)/LG 2 ====
- Major Kurt Kleinrath, 1 November 1938 – 14 March 1939
- Oberstleutnant Radeke, 14 March 1939 – 1 May 1939
- Oberstleutnant Günther Lohmann, 1 May 1939 – 26 August 1939

== Bibliography ==
- Shores, Christopher (1977). Ground Attack Aircraft of World War Two. London: Macdonald and Jane's, 1977. ISBN 0-356-08338-1.
- de Zeng, H.L.; Stankey, D.G.; Creek, E.J. (2008). Bomber Units of the Luftwaffe 1933–1945; A Reference Source. Vol. 2. Ian Allan Publishing. ISBN 978-1-903223-87-1.
