= Repyovka, Voronezh Oblast =

Rural locality in Voronezh Oblast, Russia

Coordinates: 51°04′45″N 38°38′36″E

Repyovka (Russian: Репьёвка) is a rural locality (a selo) and the administrative center of Repyovsky District of Voronezh Oblast, Russia. Population: 5,401 (2021 census); 5,332 (2010 census); 5,905 (2002 census); 5,965 (1989 Soviet census).
