= Repyovsky District =

Repyovsky District Репьёвский район (Russian)
- District
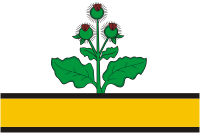
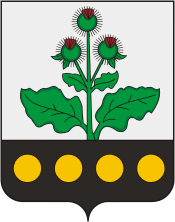
- Flag Coat of arms
- Location of Repyovsky District in Voronezh Oblast
- Coordinates: 51°04′40″N 38°38′00″E
- Country: Russia
- Federal subject: Voronezh Oblast
- Established: 30 July 1928
- Administrative center: Repyovka

Area
  - Total: 934 km^{2} (361 sq mi)

Population (2010 Census)
  - Total: 16,027
  - Density: 17.2/km^{2} (44.4/sq mi)
  - Urban: 0%
  - Rural: 100%

Administrative structure
  - Administrative divisions: 11 Rural settlements
  - Inhabited localities: 42 rural localities

Municipal structure
  - Municipally incorporated as: Repyovsky Municipal District
  - Municipal divisions: 0 urban settlements, 11 rural settlements
- Time zone: UTC+3 (MSK)
- OKTMO ID: 20645000
- Website: http://www.repevka-msu.ru/

Repyovsky District (Russian: Репьёвский райо́н) is an administrative and municipal district (raion), one of the thirty-two in Voronezh Oblast, Russia. It is located in the northwest of the oblast. The area of the district is 934 square kilometers (361 sq mi). Its administrative center is the rural locality (a selo) of Repyovka. Population: 15,304 (2021 Census); 16,027 (2010 Census); 17,884 (2002 Census); 20,420 (1989 Soviet census). The population of Repyovka accounts for 35.3% of the district's total population.
