= Pantal =

Alloy of aluminum and titanium

Pantal is an alloy of mostly aluminium and titanium, invented in interbellum Germany and used in aircraft of that era for individual parts such as flaps. More stable than aluminum, it can be welded just as easily.
