= Rostov-on-Don =

City in Rostov Oblast, Russia

Rostov-on-Don Ростов-на-Дону
- City
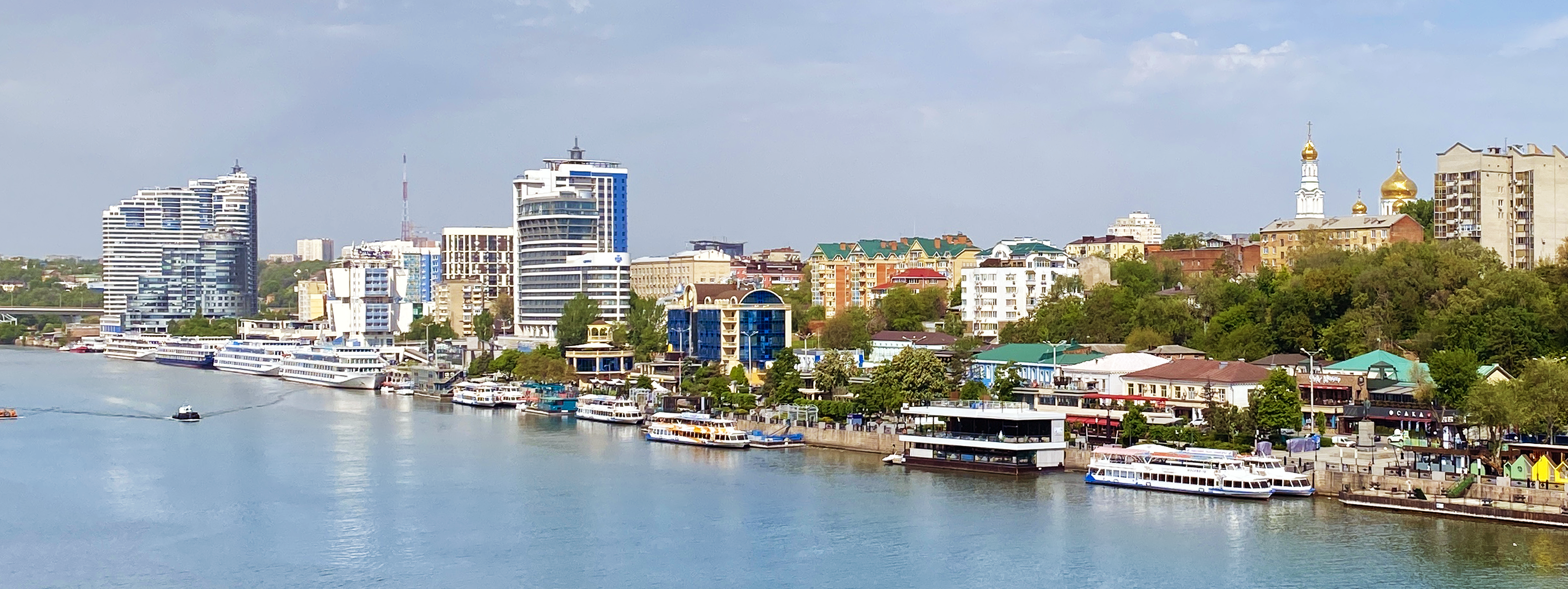
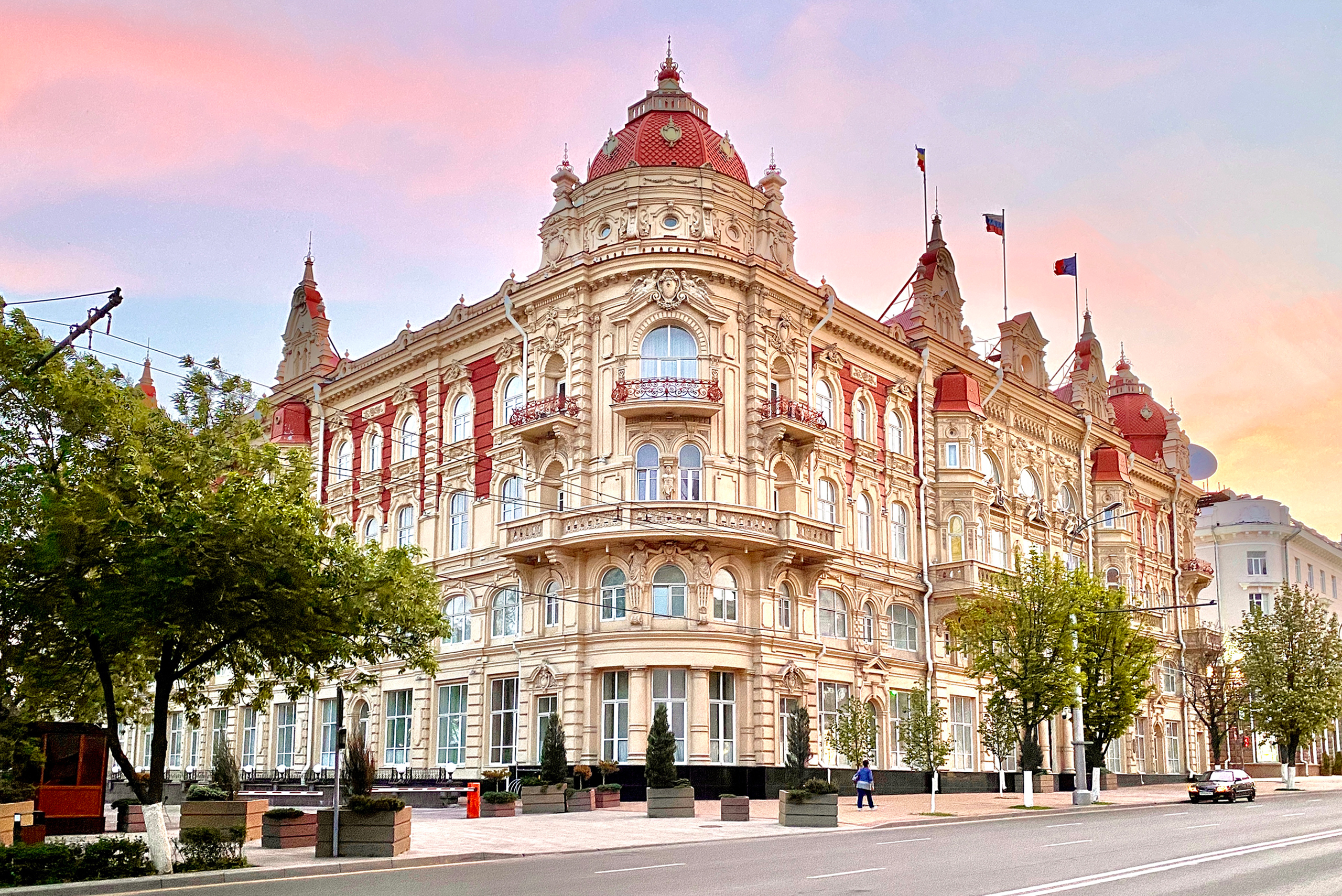
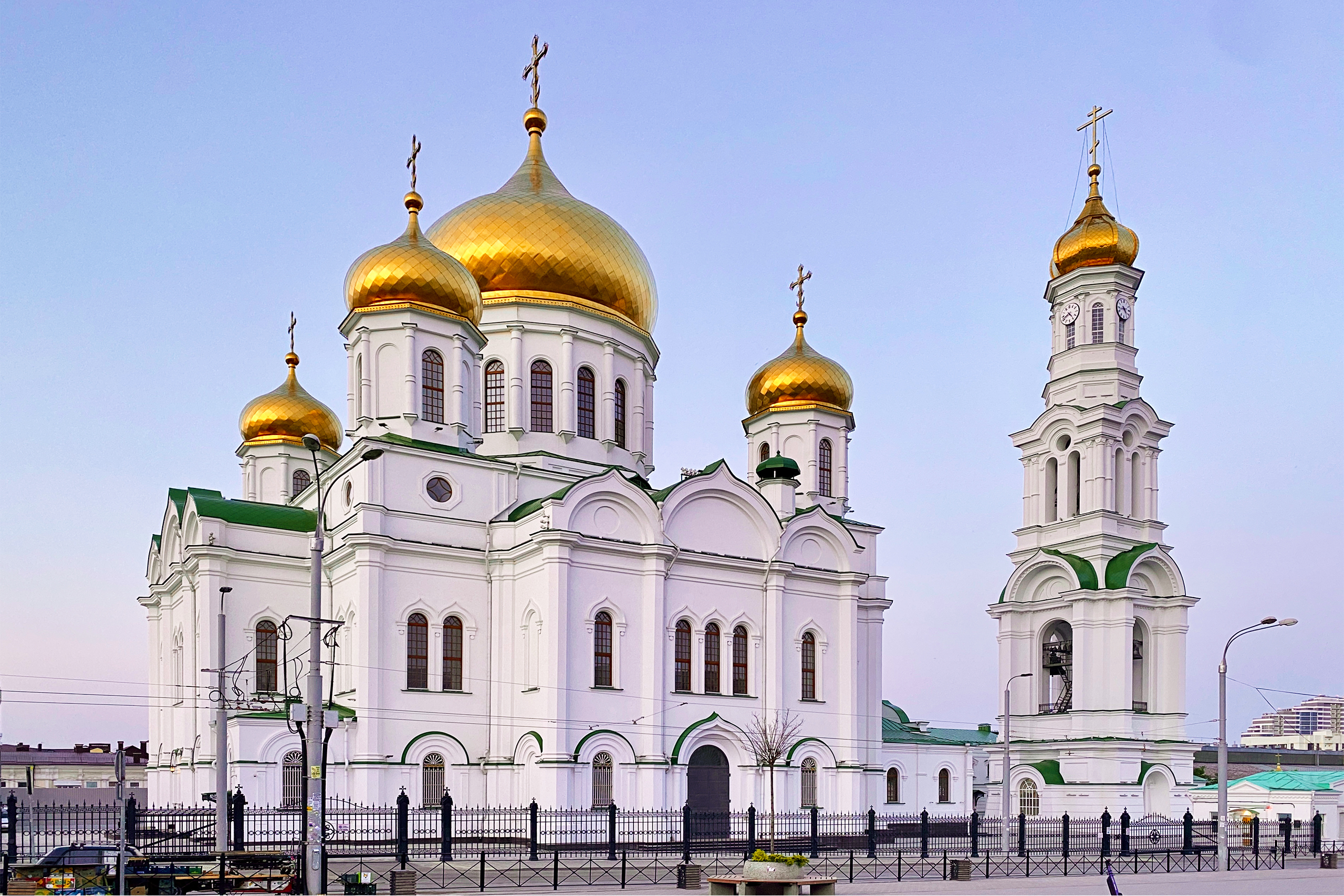
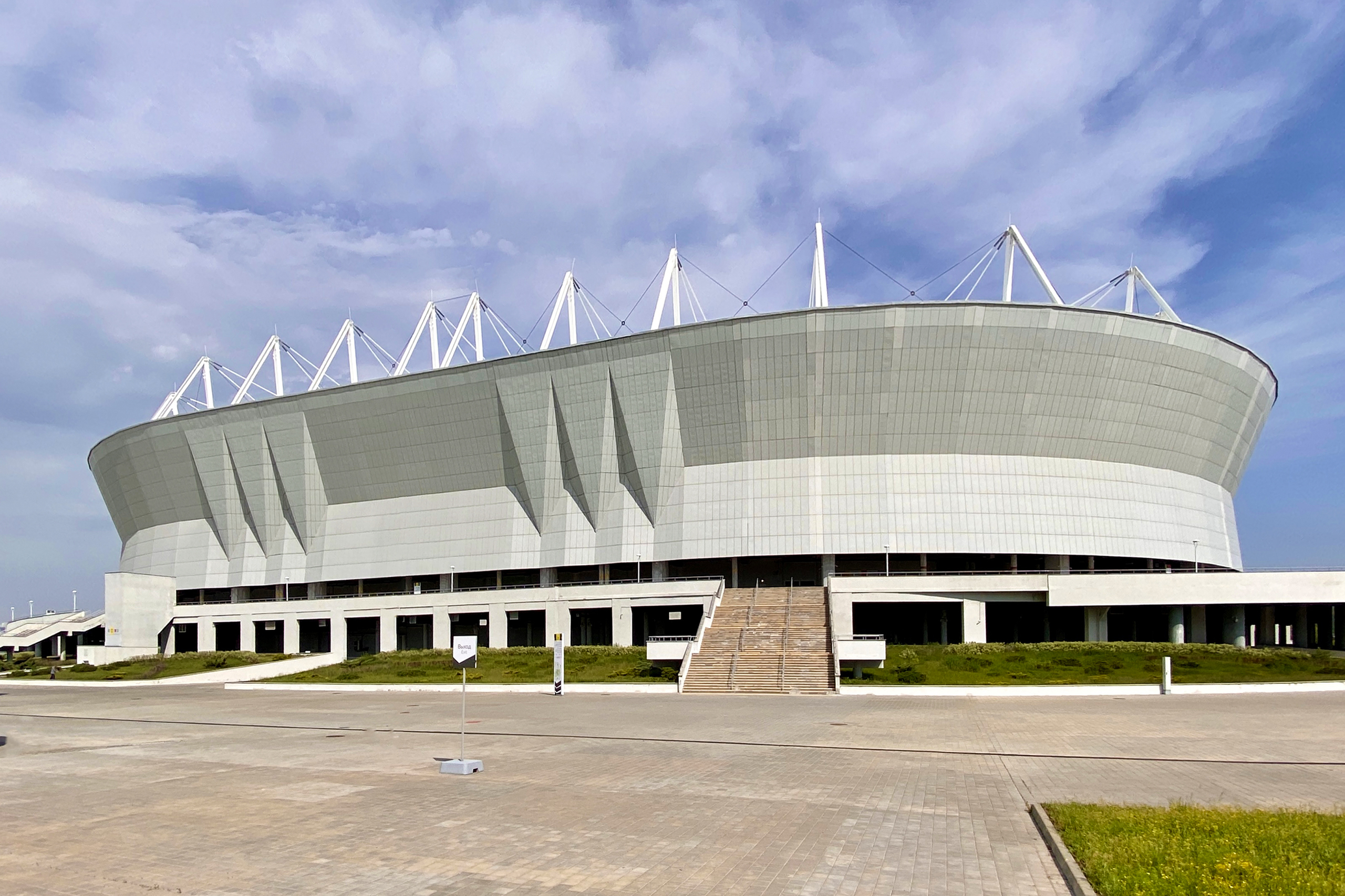
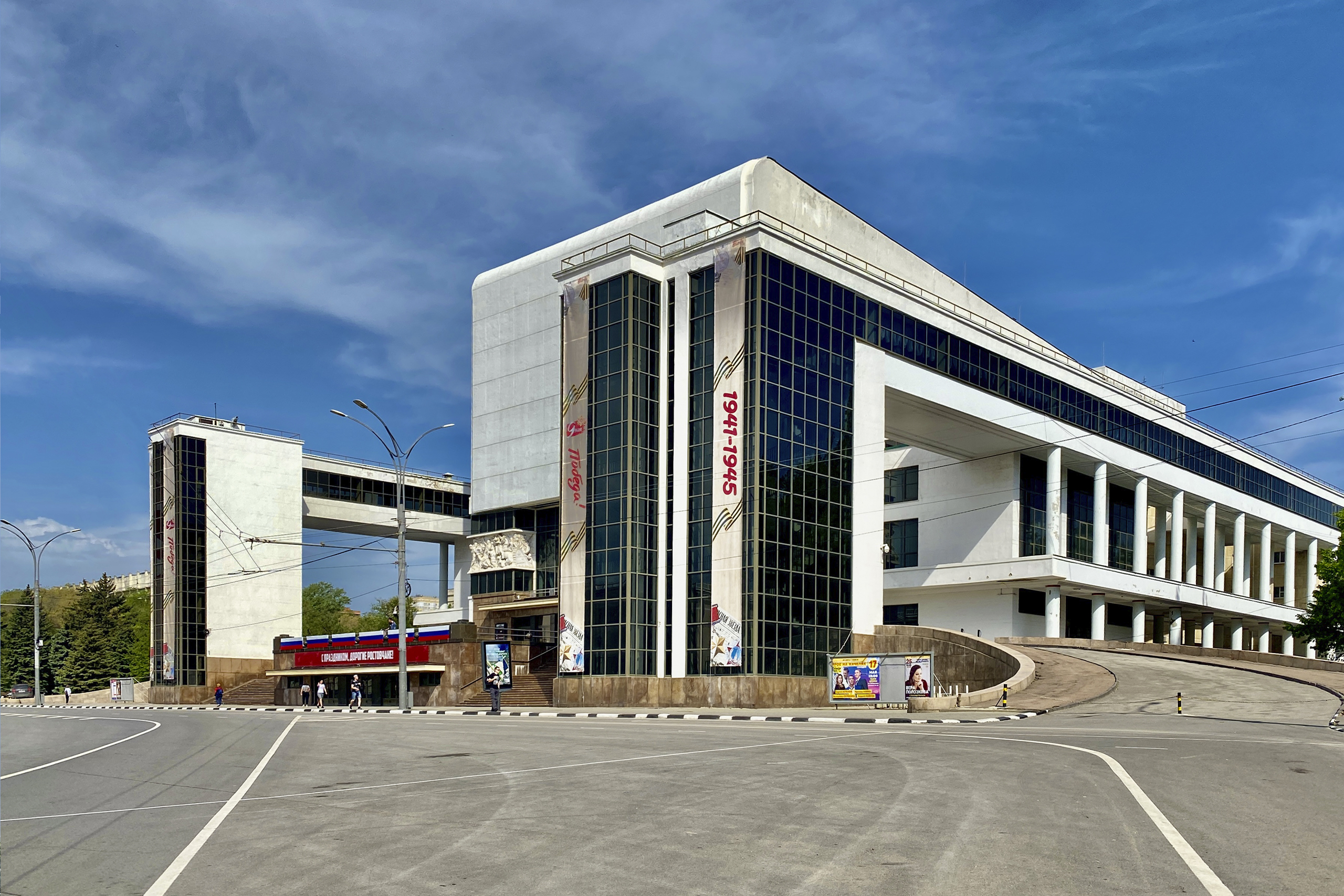
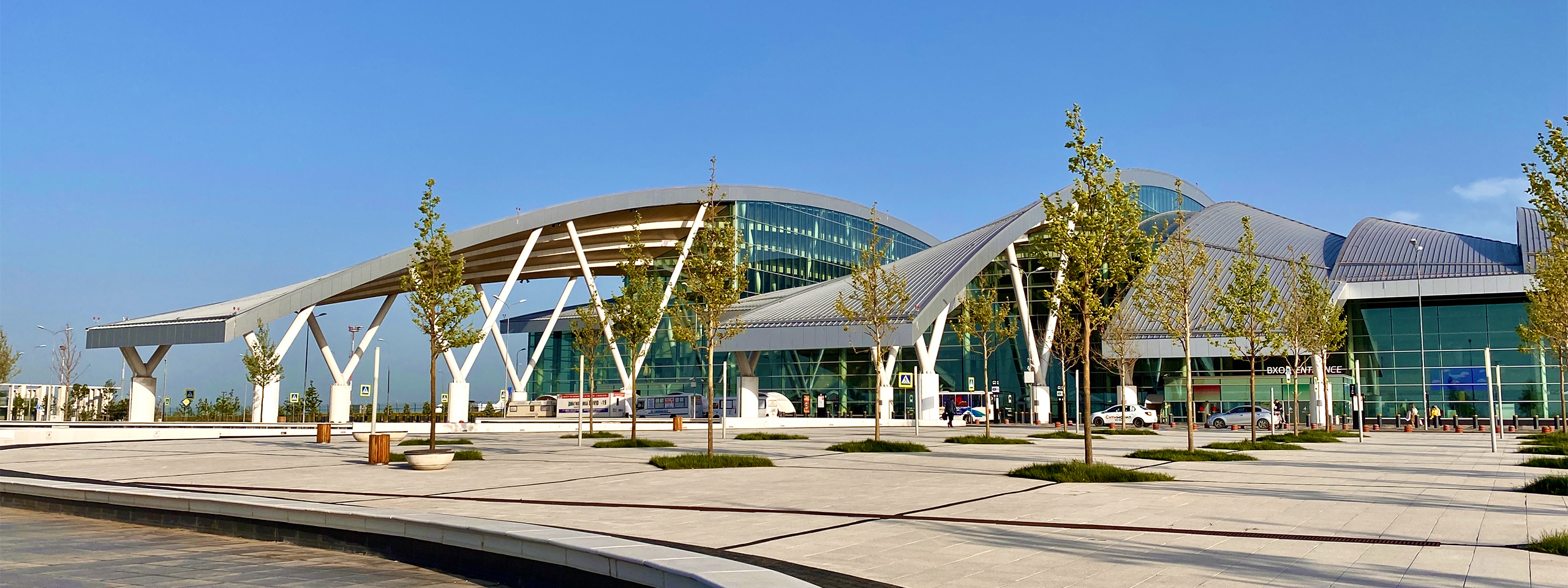
- Don River embankment Rostov City Hall Rostov-on-Don Cathedral Rostov Arena Gorky Drama Theatre Platov Airport

- Flag Coat of arms
- Anthem: Anthem of Rostov-on-Don
- Interactive map of Rostov-on-Don
- Location of Rostov-on-Don within Rostov Oblast Location of Rostov-on-Don within Russia Location of Rostov-on-Don within Europe
- Coordinates: 47°13′21″N 39°42′36″E
- Country: Russia
- Federal subject: Rostov Oblast
- Founded: 1749
- City status since: 1796

Government
  - Body: City Duma
  - Head: Alexander Skryabin

Area
  - Total: 348.5 km^{2} (134.6 sq mi)
- Elevation: 70 m (230 ft)

Population (2010 Census)
  - Total: 1,089,261
  - Estimate (2025): 1,125,000 (+3.3%)
  - Rank: 10th in 2010
  - Density: 3,126/km^{2} (8,095/sq mi)

Administrative status
  - Subordinated to: Rostov-na-Donu Urban Okrug
  - Capital of: Rostov Oblast, Rostov-na-Donu Urban Okrug

Municipal status
  - Urban okrug: Rostov-na-Donu Urban Okrug
  - Capital of: Rostov-na-Donu Urban Okrug
- Time zone: UTC+3 (MSK)
- Postal codes: 344000–344002, 344004, 344006, 344007, 344009–344013, 344015, 344016, 344018–344023, 344025, 344029, 344030, 344032–344034, 344037–344039, 344041, 344045, 344048, 344050, 344052, 344055, 344056, 344058, 344064, 344065, 344068, 344069, 344072, 344079, 344082, 344090–344095, 344101, 344103, 344111–344114, 344116, 344700, 344880, 344890, 344899, 344960–344965, 344999, 901078, 995100
- Dialing code: +7 863
- OKTMO ID: 60701000001
- City Day: Third Sunday of September
- Website: www.rostov-gorod.ru

Rostov-on-Don, (Note: Russian: Ростов-на-Дону, romanized: Rostov-na-Donu, IPA: [rɐˈstof nə dɐˈnu]) or simply Rostov, is a port city and the administrative centre of Rostov Oblast and the Southern Federal District of Russia. It lies in the southeastern part of the East European Plain on the Don River, 32 kilometers (20 mi) from the Sea of Azov, directly north of the North Caucasus. The southwestern suburbs of the city lie above the Don river delta. Rostov-on-Don has a population of over one million people and is an important cultural, educational, economic and logistical centre of Southern Russia.

== History ==
=== Early history ===
From ancient times, the area around the mouth of the Don River has held cultural and commercial importance. Ancient indigenous inhabitants included the Scythian and Sarmatian tribes. It was the site of Tanais, an ancient Greek colony, Fort Tana under the Genoese, and Fort Azak in the time of the Ottoman Empire.

In 1749, a custom house was established on the Temernik River, a tributary of the Don, by edict of the Empress Elizabeth, the daughter of Peter the Great, in order to control trade with Turkey. It was co-located with a fortress named for Dimitry of Rostov, a metropolitan bishop of the old northern town of Rostov the Great. Azov, a town closer to the Sea of Azov on the Don, gradually lost its commercial importance in the region to the new fortress, but it remains an important historical center.

In 1756, the "Russian commercial and trading company of Constantinople" was founded at the "merchants' settlement" (Kupecheskaya Sloboda) on the high bank of the Don. Towards the end of the eighteenth century, with the incorporation of previously Ottoman Black Sea territories into the Russian Empire, the settlement lost much of its militarily strategic importance as a frontier post.

In 1796, the settlement was chartered and in 1797, it became the seat of Rostovsky Uyezd within Novorossiysk Governorate. In 1806, it was officially renamed Rostov-on-Don. During the 19th century, due to its river connections with Russia's interior, Rostov developed into a major trade centre and communications hub. A railway connection with Kharkiv was completed in 1870, with further links following in 1871 to Voronezh and in 1875 to Vladikavkaz.

Concurrent with improvements in communications, heavy industry developed. Coal from the Donets Basin and iron ore from Krivoy Rog supported the establishment of an iron foundry in 1846. In 1859, the production of pumps and steam boilers began. Industrial growth was accompanied by a rapid increase in population, with 119,500 residents registered in Rostov by the end of the nineteenth century along with approximately 140 industrial businesses. The harbour was one of the largest trade hubs in southern Russia, especially for the export of wheat, timber, and iron ore.

In 1779, Rostov-on-Don became associated with a settlement of Armenian refugees from Crimea at Nakhichevan-on-Don. The two settlements were separated by a field of wheat. In 1928, the two towns were merged. The former town border lies beneath the Teatralnaya Square of central Rostov-on-Don. By 1928, following the incorporation of the hitherto neighbouring city of Nakhichevan-on-Don, Rostov had become the third-largest city in Russia.

In the early 20th century, epidemics of cholera during the summer months were not uncommon.

=== 20th century ===
During World War I, Rostov-on-Don was briefly occupied by the German Empire in 1918.

During the Russian Civil War, the Whites and the Reds contested Rostov-on-Don, then the most heavily industrialized city of South Russia. By 1928, the regional government had moved from the old Cossack capital of Novocherkassk to Rostov-on-Don.

In the Soviet years, the Bolsheviks demolished two of Rostov-on-Don's principal landmarks: St. Alexander Nevsky Cathedral (1908) and St. George Cathedral (1783–1807).

During World War II, Nazi German forces occupied Rostov-on-Don, at first from 19/20 November to 2 December 1941, after attacks by the German First Panzer Army in the Battle of Rostov, and then for seven months from 24 July 1942 to 14 February 1943. The town was of strategic importance as a railway junction and a river port accessing the Caucasus, a region rich in oil and minerals. It took ten years to restore the city from the damage during World War II.

In 1942, up to 30,000 Russian Jews were massacred by the German military in Rostov-on-Don at a site called Zmievskaya Balka.

=== 21st century ===
On 19 March 2016, Flydubai Flight 981, a Boeing 737-800 operating from Dubai to Rostov-on-Don in Russia, crashed during a go-around in inclement weather at Rostov-on-Don Airport, killing all 62 people (55 passengers and seven crew) on board.

Rostov-on-Don hosted several matches of the 2018 FIFA World Cup.

Rostov-on-Don is the location of the Russian Southern Military District, which includes the 58th Combined Arms Army. As such, it was a key logistical hub during the 2022 Russian invasion of Ukraine and the 2023 Ukrainian counteroffensive.

On 23 June 2023, amid the war, the Wagner Group, a private military company fighting on behalf of the Russian Federation, declared a rebellion against the Russian Ministry of Defence and took control of Rostov-on-Don. On 24 June, after reaching a negotiated settlement with the Russian government and military, the Wagner Group withdrew from the city.

== Government ==
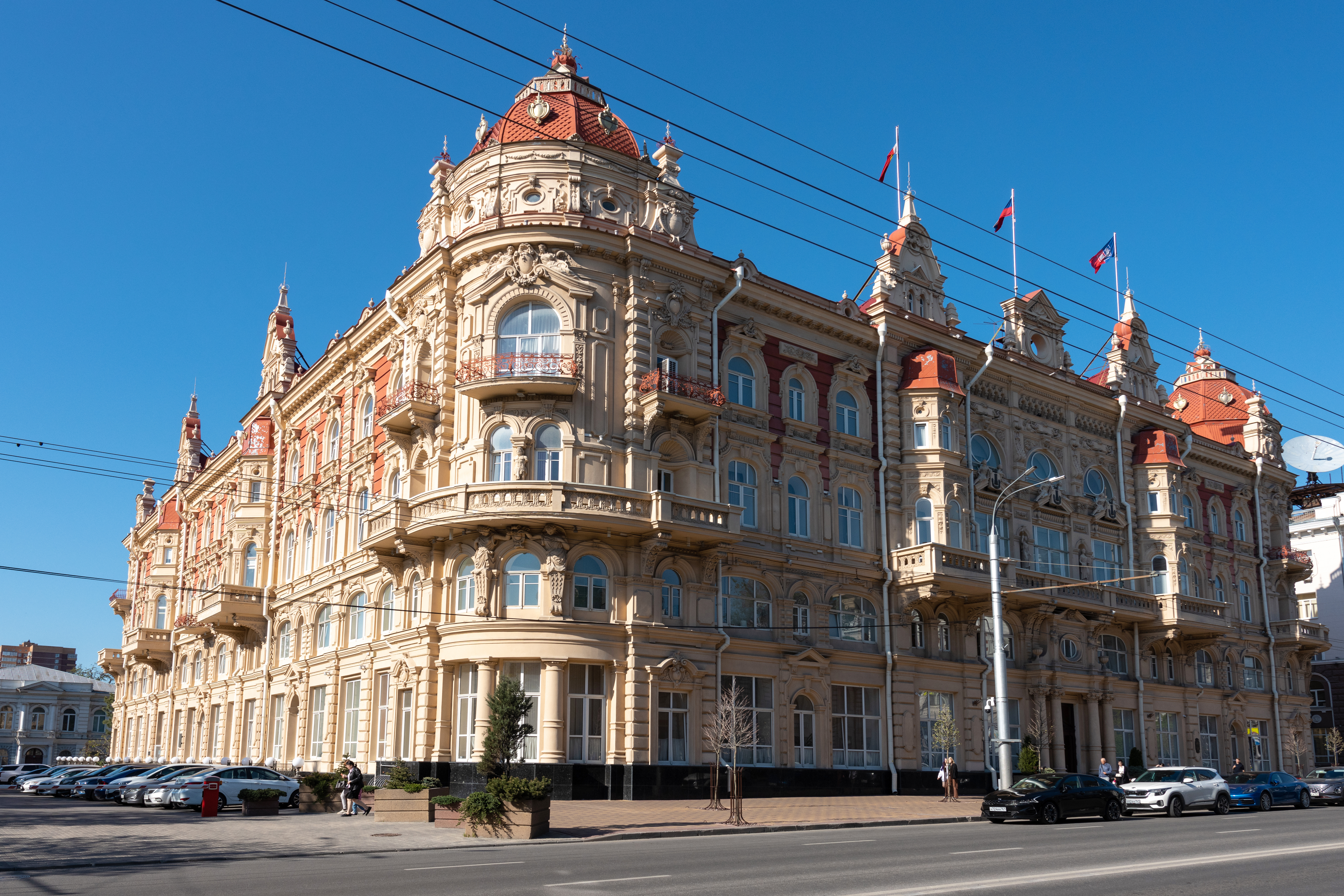
City Duma building in central Rostov-on-Don

Within the framework of administrative divisions, it is incorporated as Rostov-na-Donu Urban Okrug—an administrative unit with the status equal to that of the districts. As a municipal division, this administrative unit also has urban okrug status.

=== City districts ===
Rostov-on-Don is divided into eight city districts:

No.	City District	Population Census
1	Voroshilovsky	213,802
2	Zheleznodorozhny	102,044
3	Kirovsky	65,322
4	Leninsky	80,240
5	Oktyabrsky	165,874
6	Pervomaysky	180,061
7	Proletarsky	120,665
8	Sovetsky	175,725

== Demographics ==
The 2021 census recorded the population of Rostov-on-Don at 1,142,162 making it the 11th most populous city in Russia.

Historical population
Year	Pop.	±%
1897	119,000	—
1926	327,661	+175.3%
1939	502,928	+53.5%
1959	599,542	+19.2%
1970	788,827	+31.6%
1979	934,095	+18.4%
1989	1,019,305	+9.1%
2002	1,068,267	+4.8%
2010	1,089,261	+2.0%
2021	1,142,162	+4.9%
Source: Census data

At the time of the official 2010 Census, the ethnic makeup of the city's population whose ethnicity was known (1,066,523) was:

Ethnicity	Population	Percentage
Russians	960,883	90.1%
Armenians	41,553	3.4%
Ukrainians	16,249	1.5%
Azerbaijanis	6,739	0.6%
Tatars	5,291	0.5%
Georgians	3,960	0.4%
Belarusians	2,874	0.3%
Koreans	2,792	0.3%
Others	26,182	2.5%

== Geography ==
=== Climate ===
Albert Parry, born in 1901 in Rostov-on-Don, wrote of the summers of his childhood:

There were sultry days of brassy sun, but also cool evenings on the balconies facing the Don River, with the soft glow of charcoal in the samovar, with the ripe cherries crushed by your spoon against the bottom and sides of your glass of scalding tea.

Rostov-on-Don lies in a humid continental climate (Köppen: Dfa). The winter is moderately cold, (though mild by Russian standards), with an average January temperature of −3.0 °C (26.6 °F). The lowest recorded temperature of −31.9 °C (−25.4 °F) occurred in January 1940.

Summers are warm and humid; July temperatures average +23.4 °C (74.1 °F). The city's highest recorded temperature of +40.2 °C (104.4 °F) was reported on 7 July 2020. The mean annual precipitation is 643 millimeters (25.3 in), the average wind speed is 2.7 m/s, and the average air humidity is 72%.

Climate data for Rostov-on-Don (1991–2020, extremes 1881–present)
Month	Jan	Feb	Mar	Apr	May	Jun	Jul	Aug	Sep	Oct	Nov	Dec	Year
Record high °C (°F)	15.0 (59.0)	19.8 (67.6)	26.0 (78.8)	33.6 (92.5)	35.6 (96.1)	38.4 (101.1)	40.2 (104.4)	40.1 (104.2)	38.1 (100.6)	31.0 (87.8)	25.0 (77.0)	18.5 (65.3)	40.2 (104.4)
Mean daily maximum °C (°F)	−0.1 (31.8)	1.2 (34.2)	7.8 (46.0)	16.7 (62.1)	22.9 (73.2)	27.5 (81.5)	30.2 (86.4)	29.6 (85.3)	23.1 (73.6)	15.2 (59.4)	6.6 (43.9)	1.4 (34.5)	15.2 (59.4)
Daily mean °C (°F)	−3.0 (26.6)	−2.3 (27.9)	3.1 (37.6)	10.8 (51.4)	17.0 (62.6)	21.6 (70.9)	24.0 (75.2)	23.3 (73.9)	17.1 (62.8)	10.3 (50.5)	3.1 (37.6)	−1.3 (29.7)	10.3 (50.5)
Mean daily minimum °C (°F)	−5.2 (22.6)	−5.0 (23.0)	−0.3 (31.5)	6.1 (43.0)	11.3 (52.3)	15.7 (60.3)	17.9 (64.2)	17.5 (63.5)	12.1 (53.8)	6.5 (43.7)	0.4 (32.7)	−3.6 (25.5)	6.1 (43.0)
Record low °C (°F)	−31.9 (−25.4)	−30.9 (−23.6)	−28.1 (−18.6)	−10.4 (13.3)	−4.3 (24.3)	−0.1 (31.8)	7.6 (45.7)	2.6 (36.7)	−4.6 (23.7)	−10.4 (13.3)	−25.1 (−13.2)	−28.5 (−19.3)	−31.9 (−25.4)
Average precipitation mm (inches)	58 (2.3)	48 (1.9)	50 (2.0)	38 (1.5)	58 (2.3)	59 (2.3)	50 (2.0)	43 (1.7)	43 (1.7)	48 (1.9)	51 (2.0)	58 (2.3)	604 (23.8)
Average extreme snow depth cm (inches)	5 (2.0)	7 (2.8)	4 (1.6)	0 (0)	0 (0)	0 (0)	0 (0)	0 (0)	0 (0)	0 (0)	0 (0)	2 (0.8)	7 (2.8)
Average rainy days	11	10	12	13	14	13	11	9	10	11	15	13	142
Average snowy days	16	15	9	1	0.1	0	0	0	0	1	6	14	62
Average relative humidity (%)	84	81	76	66	63	64	61	59	67	75	84	86	72
Mean monthly sunshine hours	64	82	128	189	265	286	314	293	240	159	64	38	2,122
Source 1: Pogoda.ru.net
Source 2: NOAA (sun, 1961–1990)

== Symbols ==
Coat of arms of Rostov-on-Don

In December 1996, Rostov-on-Don adopted a coat of arms, a flag and a mayoral decoration as the symbols of the town. The first coat of arms of Rostov-on-Don was designed in 1811 and approved by the Tsar. In 1904, some changes were made. One lasting oil painting of the coat-of-arms is kept in the regional local history museum but its accuracy and authenticity are uncertain. In June 1996, the Rostov-on-Don City Duma adopted a variant of the coat-of-arms in which a tower represents the St. Dimitry Rostovsky Fortress. The ancient Russian arms reference the role Rostov played in the defense of Russia's borders. The coat-of-arms adorns the mayor's decoration but all other cases of its use are first considered for approval by the City Duma.

=== Flag ===
Flag of Rostov-on-Don

The flag of Rostov-on-Don was approved by the Duma on September 20, 1864. At the end of the 19th and beginning of the 20th centuries the home guard regiments, which defended the Southern borders of Russia, were raised under this flag. The "Flag of Rostov" is kept in the town's municipal building under glass. Its length is 1,370 millimeters (54 in) and width, 850 millimeters (33 in). The flag is taken out of the building only on Victory Day and Rostov-on-Don Day by a guard of honour.

In 1870, an oval-shaped mayoral decoration wrought from precious or semi-precious white metal was introduced. On the front is written "Rostov-on-Don" at the top, the Rostov-on-Don coat-of-arms is in the center and the inscription, "Mayor of the City" is written at the bottom. On its reverse side, the day of its adoption, April 9, 1996, is recorded. The decoration is worn over the suit on a large chain. The mayor returns the decoration to the Duma on his or her retirement from office.

The Emblem of the Don Host Oblast was introduced in July 5 (18), 1878. The flag of the All Great Don Army was introduced in May 1918 on the "Circle of the Don Saving".

== Awards ==
- December 1970: Order of Lenin
- 1982: Order of the Great Patriotic War 1st class
- 2008: City of Military Glory status

== Economy ==
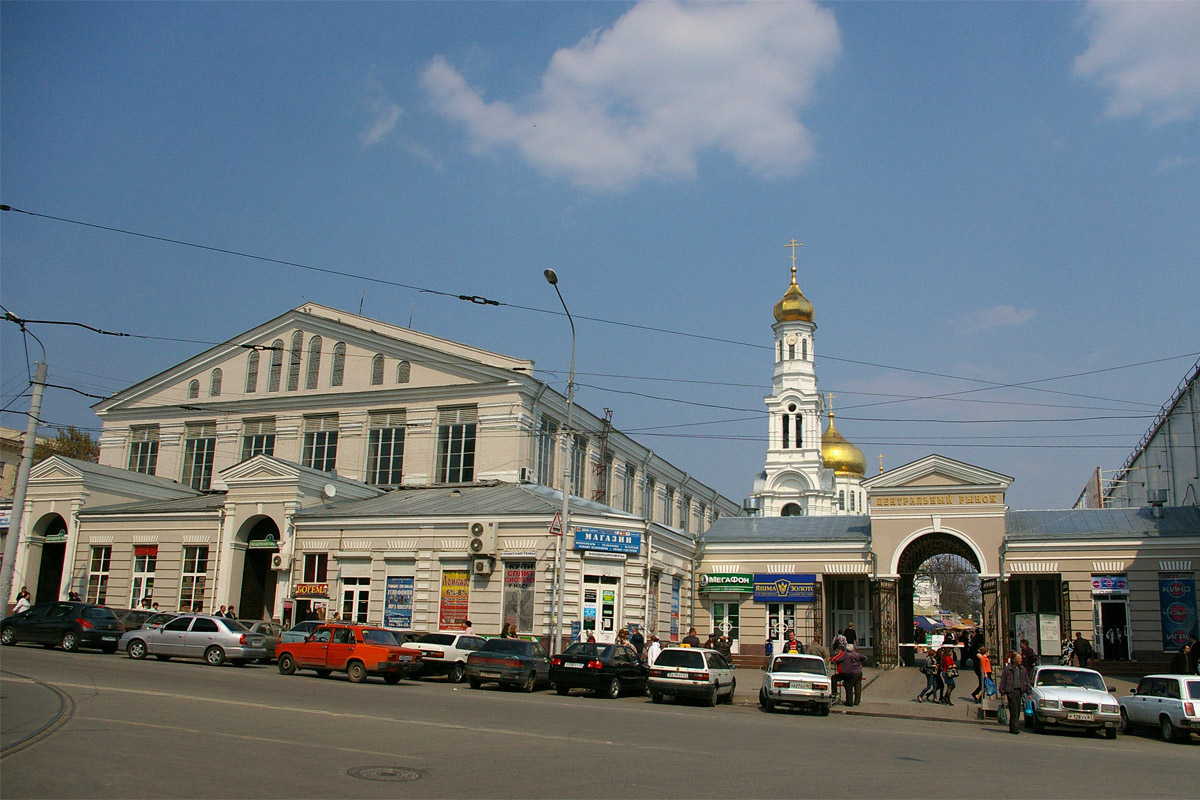
Central Market near the Nativity Cathedral

=== Overview ===
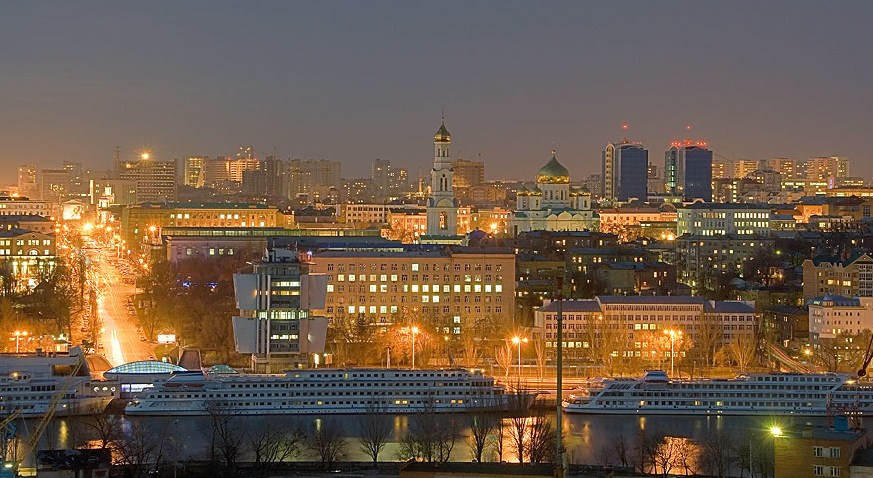
View of Rostov-on-Don, May 2007

Rostov's favourable geographical position at trading crossroads promotes economic development. The Don River is a major shipping lane connecting southwestern Russia with the north. Rostov-on-Don is a trading port for Russian, Italian, Greek and Turkish merchants selling, for example, wool, wheat and oil. It is also an important river port for passengers.

=== Volga–Don Canal ===
With the construction of the Volga-Don Shipping Canal in 1952, Rostov-on-Don has become known as a "port of five seas" (reachable from the Black Sea, the Sea of Azov, the Caspian Sea, the White Sea, and the Baltic Sea).

=== Modern industry ===
In modern times, Rostov-on-Don has experienced economic growth. Numerous start-up companies have established headquarters in the city, the median income in 2013 was increasing, and the city is being transformed into a modern, industrial and technology-rich hub. For instance, Rostov-on-Don is a center for helicopter and farm machinery manufacturing. The "Tebodin" engineering company opened its fourth office in Rostov-on-Don in June 2010.

=== Transportation ===
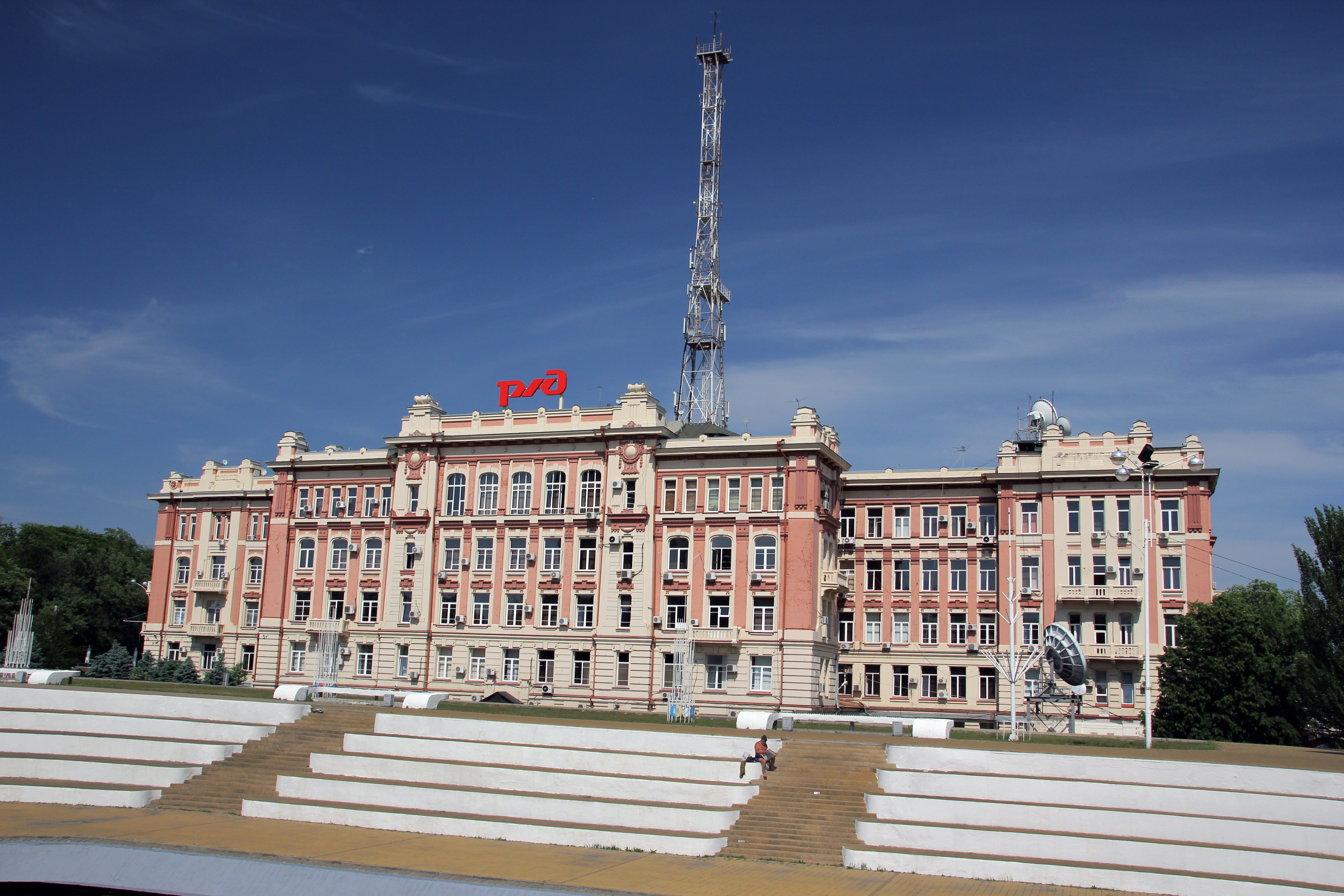
North Caucasus Railway Administration Building

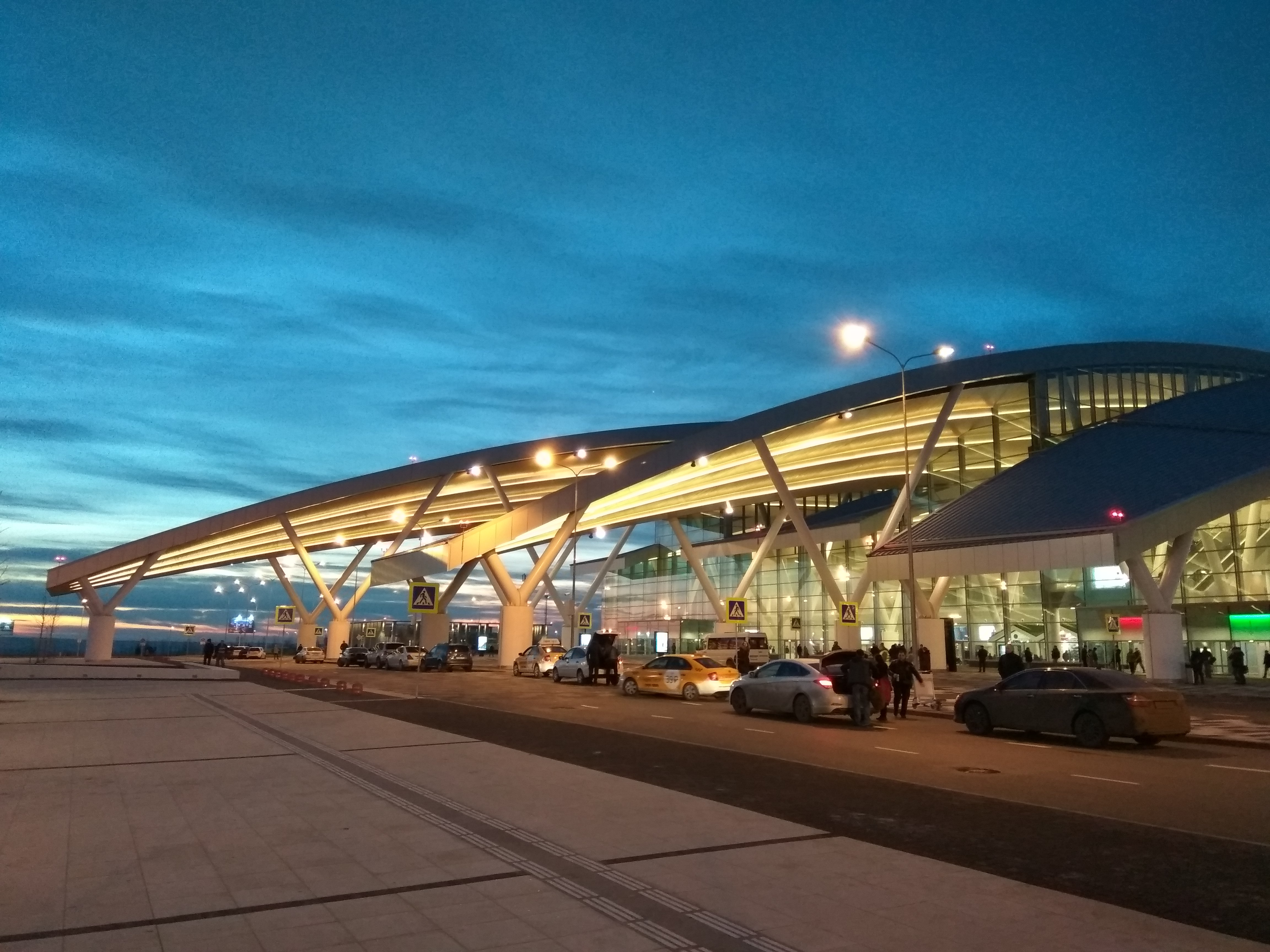
Platov International Airport

Public transport in Rostov-on-Don includes buses, trolleybuses, trams, and marshrutkas (routed minibus, usually a 17-passenger Mercedes Sprinter). The Rostov Metro was planned in the early 1990s and later in the 2000s and 2010s. At the end of 2021, the Government of the Rostov Region and the Sinara company signed an agreement on the creation of a high-speed tramway in Rostov-on-Don on a concession basis. This happened at the international forum Transport Week 2021 in Moscow. By signing this agreement, the regional government put an end to the idea of developing the metro in the city in favour of the tram.

Platov International Airport (IATA code ROV) caters for domestic travel, as well as flights to and from the former C.I.S., Europe, Africa and Asia. It was opened in late 2017 as part of preparations for the 2018 FIFA World Cup, replacing Rostov-on-Don Airport. The Bataysk military aerodrome (which is located 5.0 miles (8.0 km) northwest of the city center) may be developed into a new airport hub for Southern Russia.

The international river port specializes in the packaging and freighting of minerals and timber. Shipping information is published online.

The main railway stations in Rostov-on-Don are "Rostov-Glavny" and "Rostov-Prigorodny". The "St. Petersburg-Rostov-Caucasus" railway crosses the territory of Rostov-on-Don. The North Caucasus Railway Administration Building is in Rostov-on-Don.

Several highways of federal and regional significance cross Rostov. The M-4 "Don" route passes Rostov to the east and crosses the Don River in the Aksay city area. The "Rostov-Novoshakhtinsk" starts from the Northern housing block area of the city running north to connect with the M-4 "Don" route between Shakhty and Novoshakhtinsk.

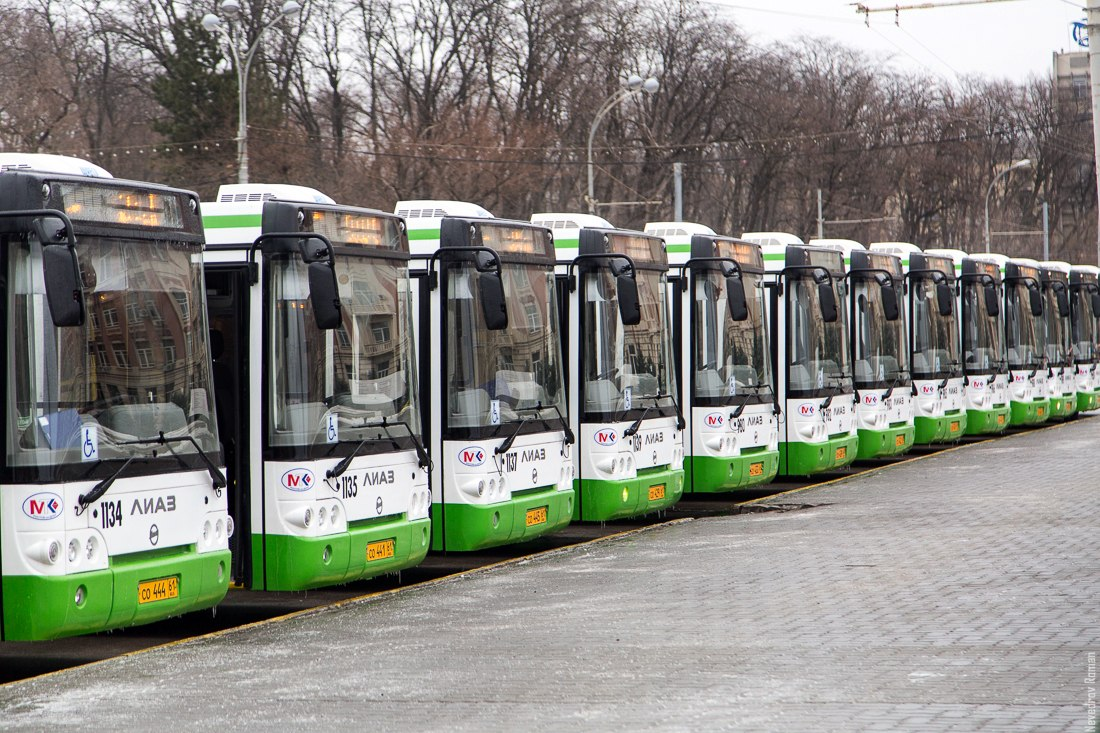
New LiAZ-5292 buses

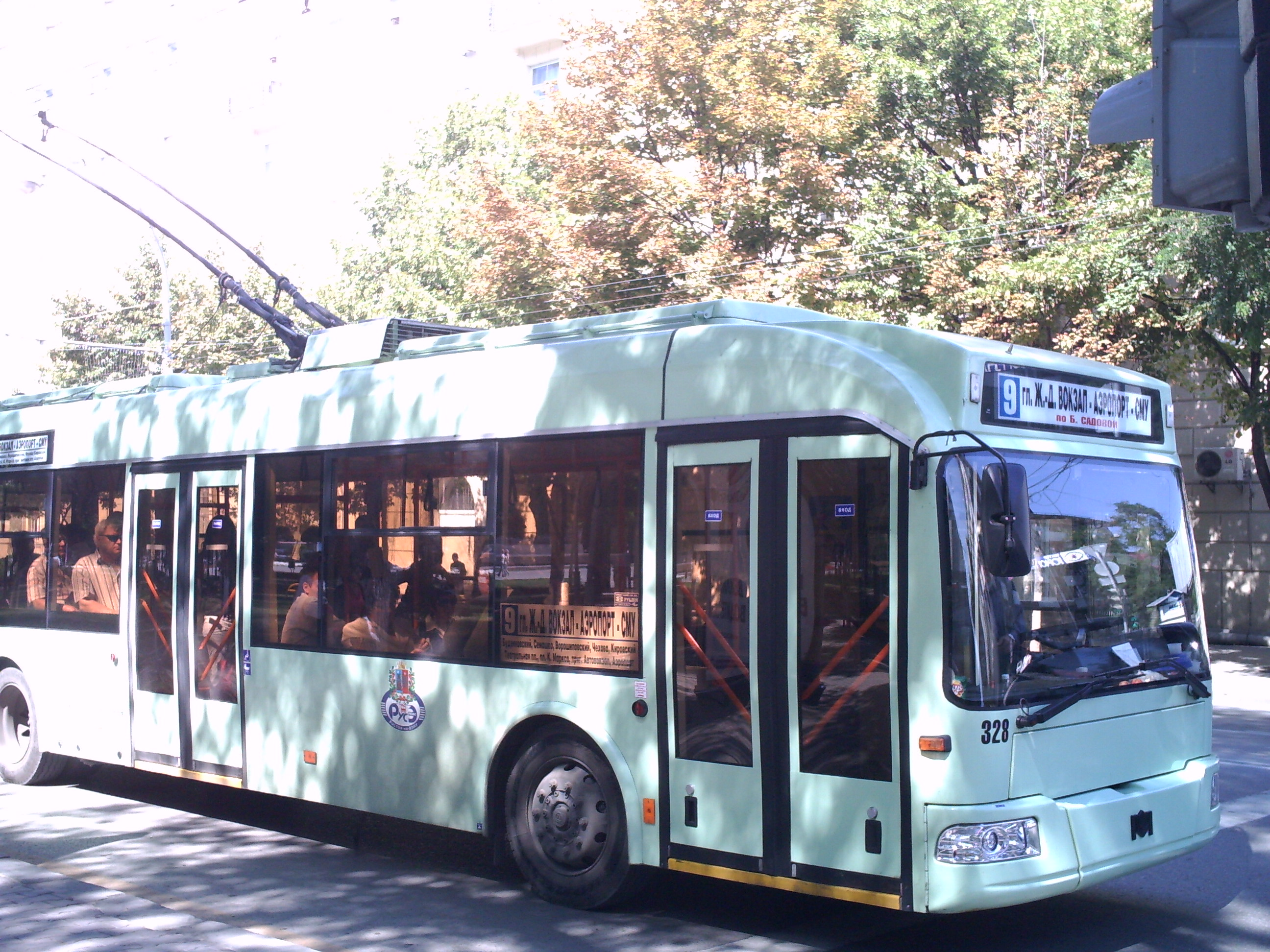
AKSM-321 low-floor trolleybus

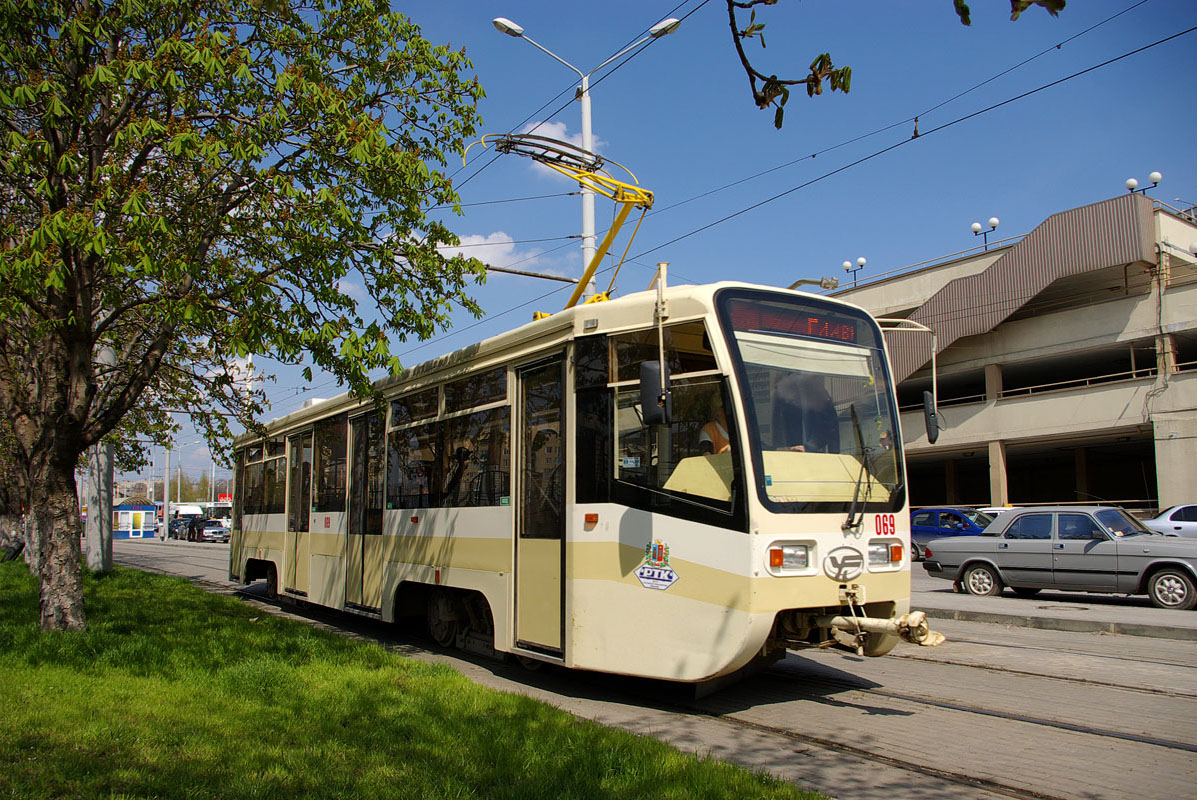
KTM-19 tram

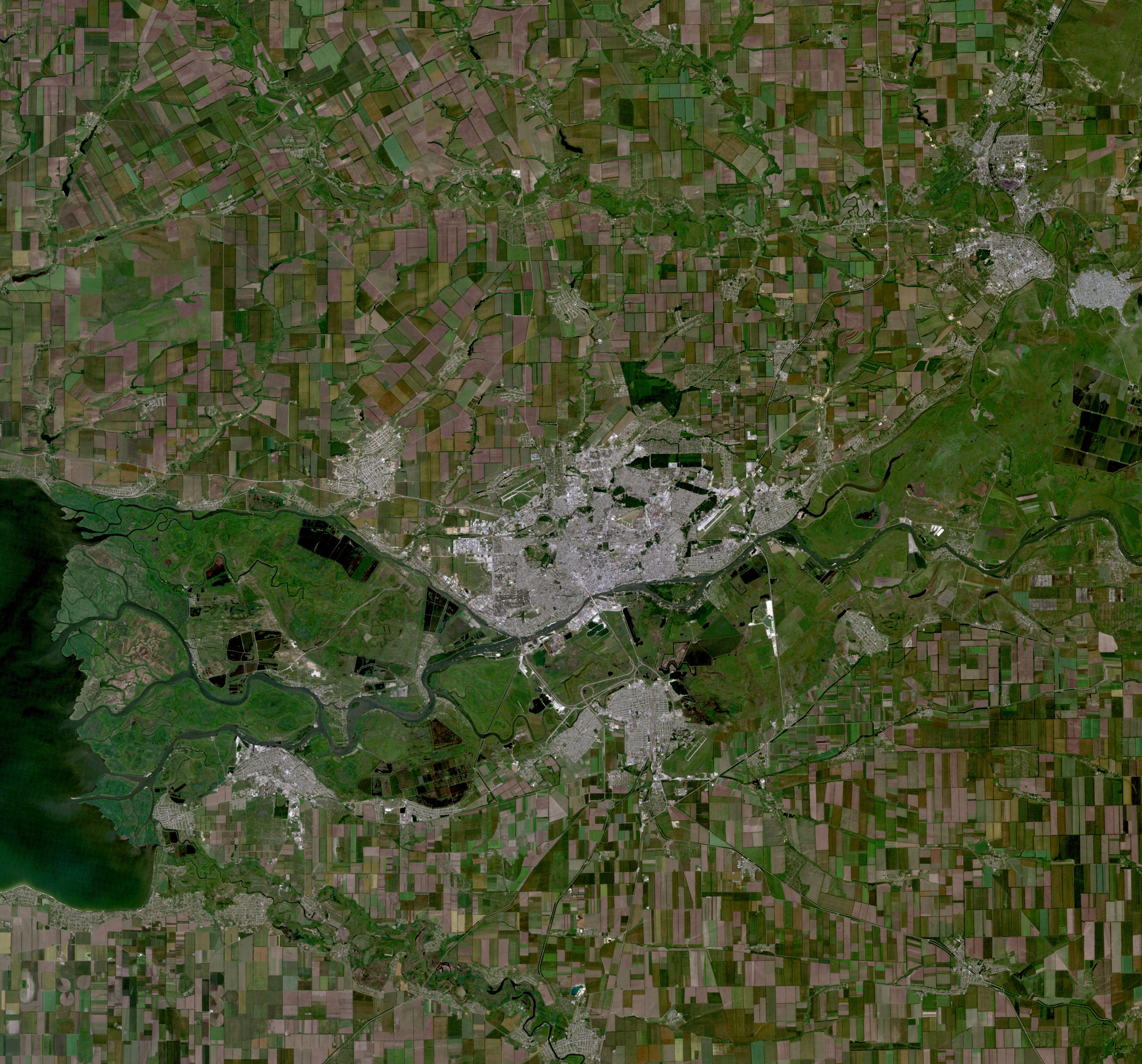
Rostov (in center) and vicinities: Bataysk to the south, Azov to the south-west, Chaltyr village to the north-west, and Novocherkassk to the northeast (satellite image by Landsat-5, 2010-06-10)

=== Communications ===
In 1929, the first automatic telephone exchange in Russia with a capacity of 6,000 numbers commenced in Rostov-on-Don. Since 2004, standard telephone numbers in Rostov-on-Don have been seven digits in length. Since 2009, city numbers have begun with "2". The city dialing code is "863".

=== Financial services ===
The first commercial bank in the South of Russia, Rostovsoсbank, was opened in Rostov-on-Don. The bank existed from 1989 to 1998, and before the withdrawal of the banking license it made a full return of deposits to all depositors. The largest bank in the Rostov region is Center-Invest. In total, there are about 50 banks and their branches, 17% local banks, 80% representative offices of federal banks, and 4% representative offices of foreign banks.

== Education ==
Rostov-on-Don hosts higher educational establishments, including universities, academies, secondary schools of vocational training including colleges, technical schools, specialized schools, and elementary schools of vocational training including lyceums, professional colleges and schools of general education.

The largest educational establishments in the city include:

- Southern Federal University
- Don State Technical University
- Rostov State University of Economy
- Rostov State Transport University (The Railway Engineers' University)
- Rostov State University of Civil Engineering
- Rostov State Medical University
- Rostov State Conservatory named after Sergei Rachmaninoff
- Branch of the Moscow State Academy named after F.F. Ushakov
- Rostov Eparchy Religious College
- Rostov Institute of Advocacy of Entrepreneurs
- Rostov Institute of Foreign Languages
- Rostov International Institute of Economy and Management
- Rostov Juridical Institute of Ministry of Internal Affairs of the Russian Federation
- Rostov Institute of Physical Training and Sports (branch of the Cuban State University of Physical Training, Sports and Tourism)
- Rostov Social & Economic Institute
- Rostov branch of Moscow Institute of Economy, Management and Law
- South-Russian Institute of the Humanities
- North-Caucasian Academy of Public Service
- North-Caucasian Institute of Anthropology and Applied Psychology
- The Modern University for the Humanities
- Russian State University of Trade & Economy
- Institute of Management, Business and Law,
- Rostov Institute of Law of the Russian Juridical Academy of the Russian Federation
- Rostov State Academy of Architecture and Arts,
- Rostov College of Arts named after M.B. Grekov.

There is also a French cultural centre (Alliance Francaise), a British Council and German Goethe Institute (DAAD and Bosch foundation), and a Korean Cultural Centre.

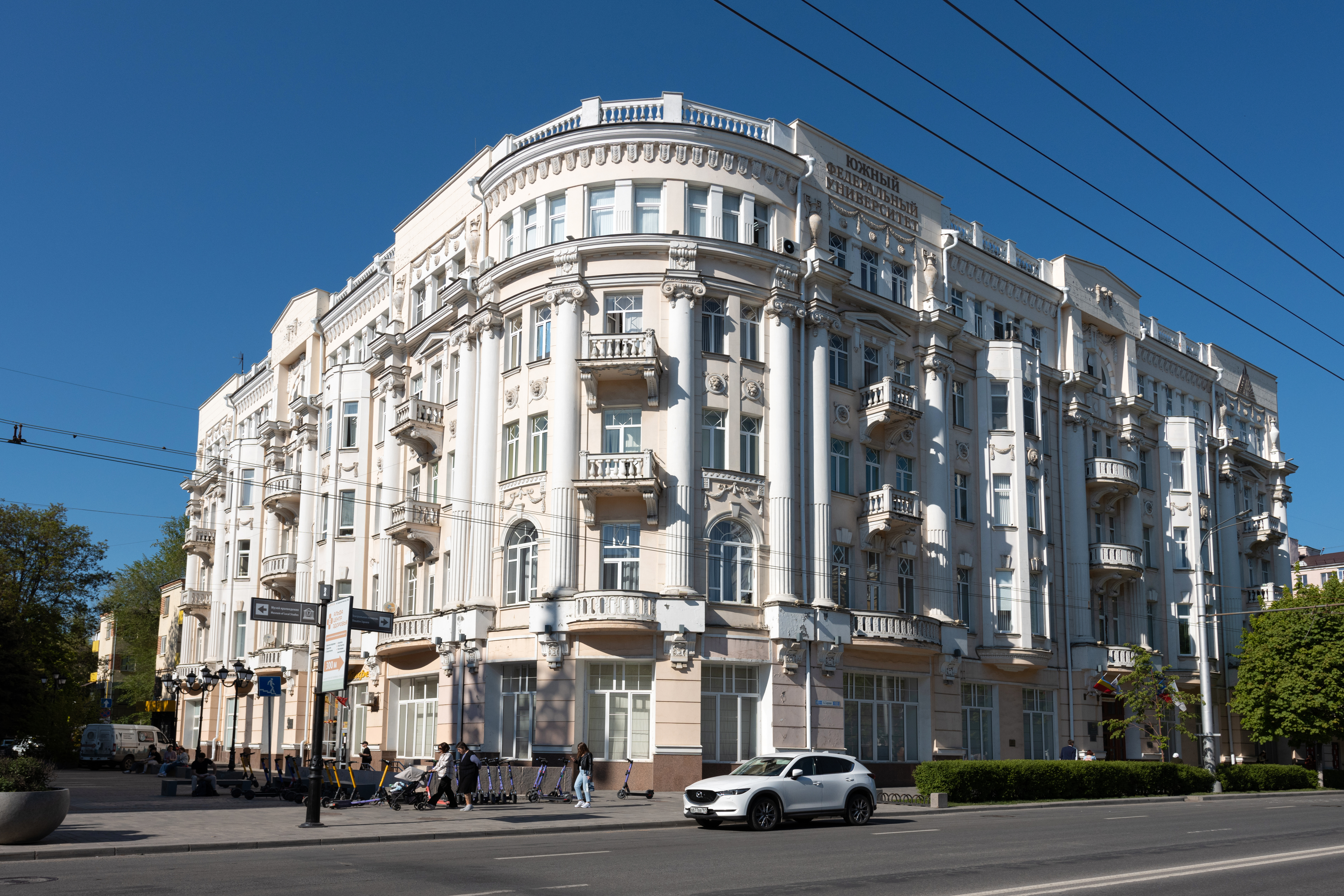
Southern Federal University

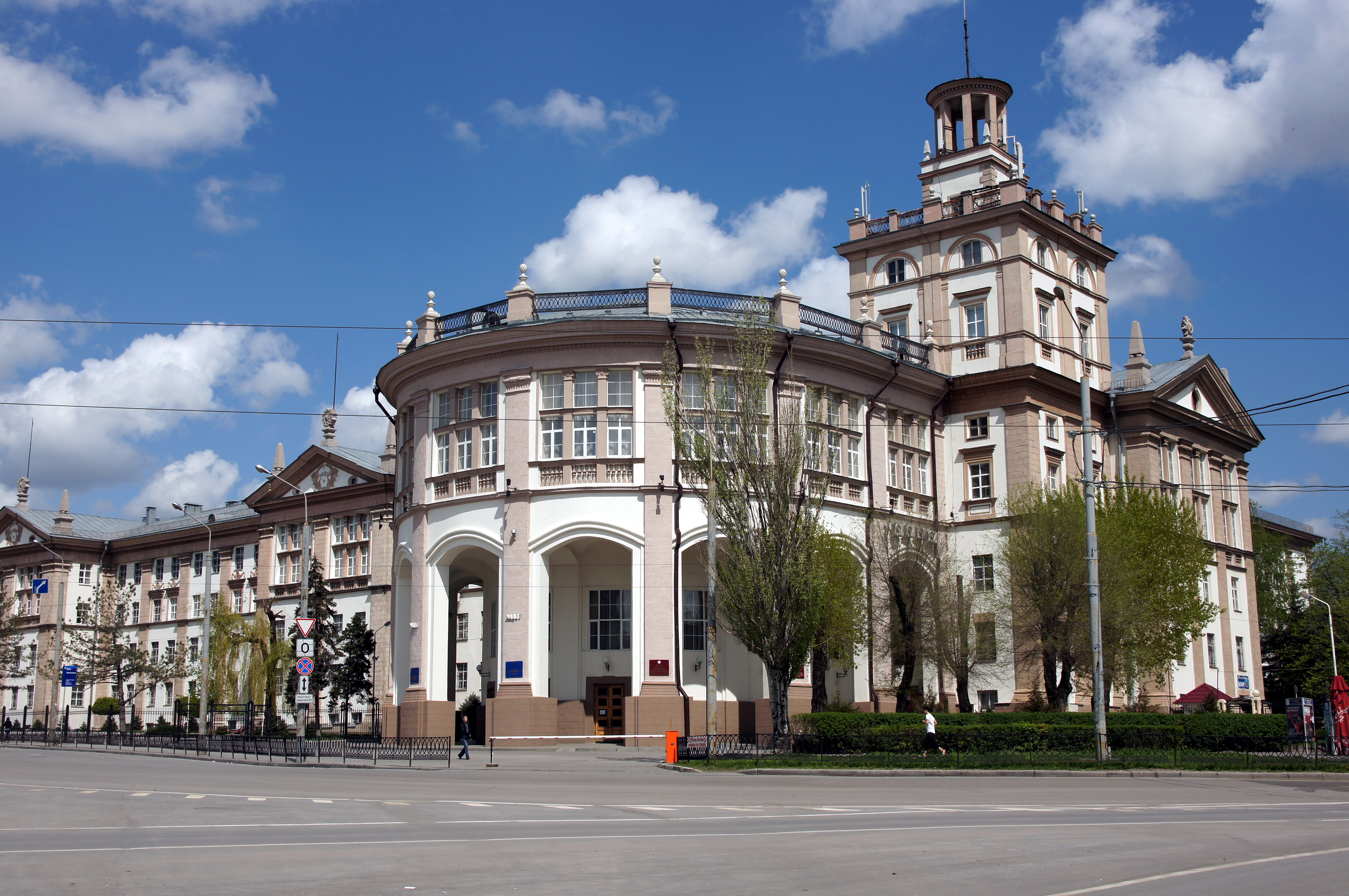
Rostov State Transport University

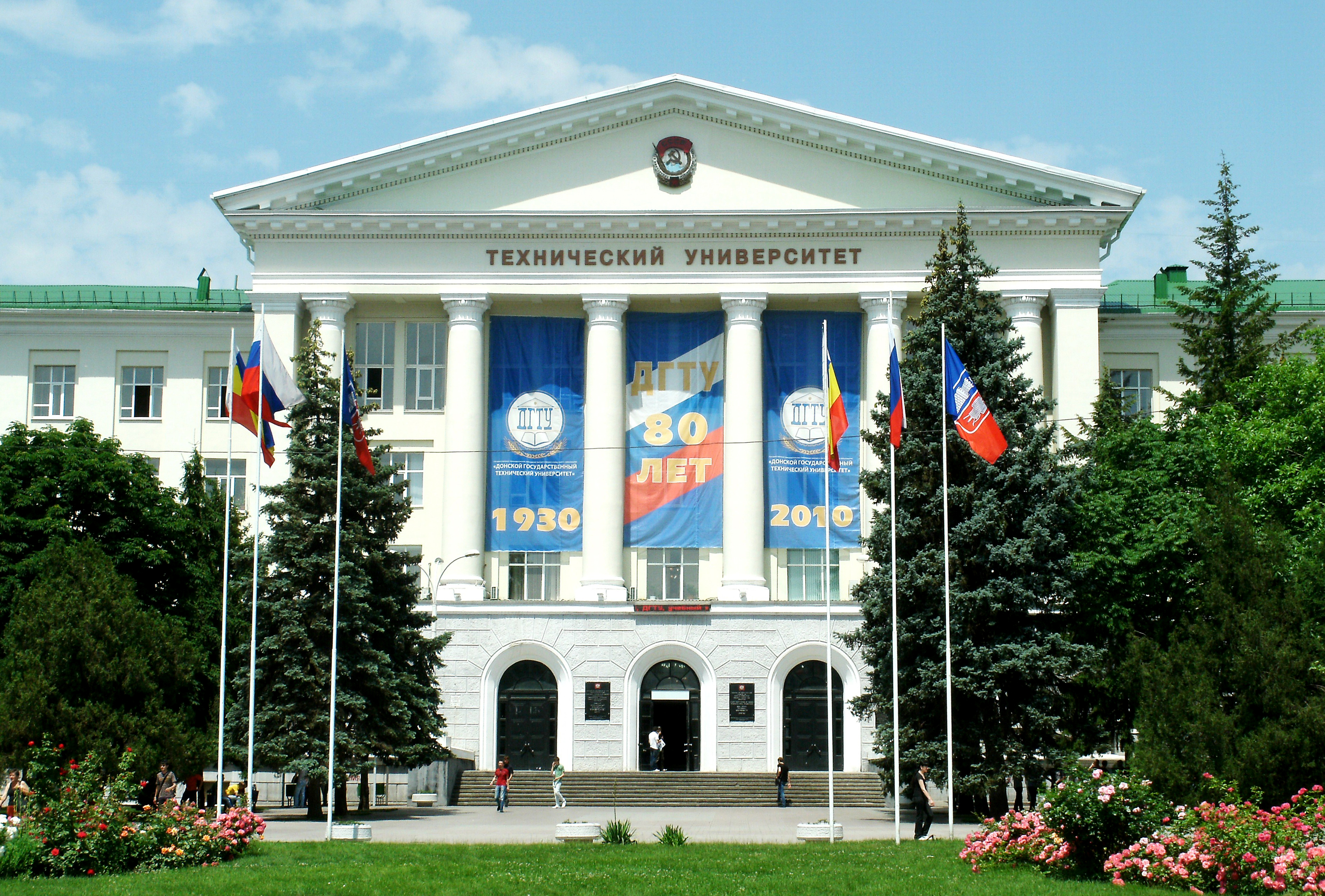
Don State Technical University

== Culture ==
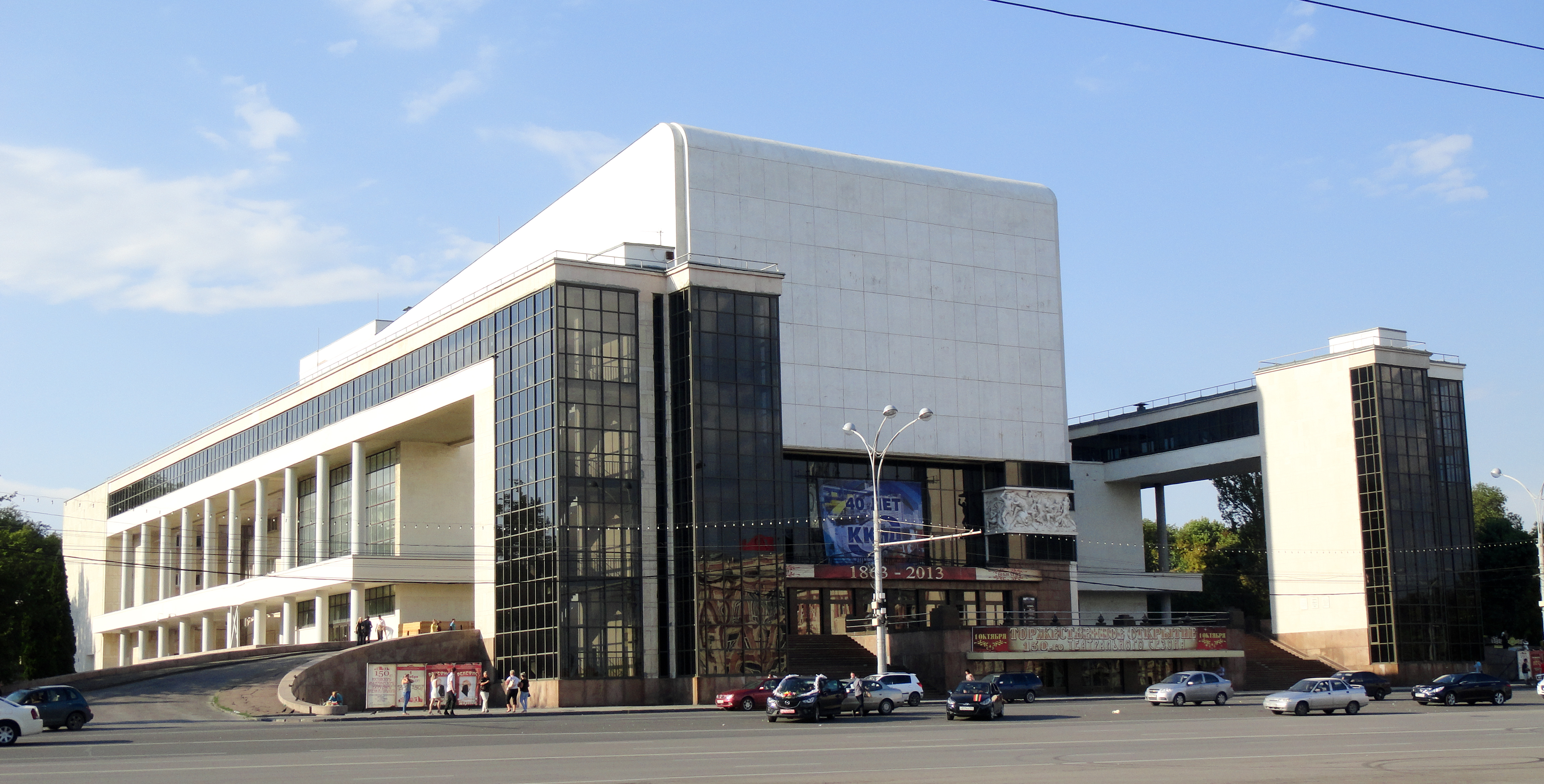
Maxim Gorky Academic Drama Theater

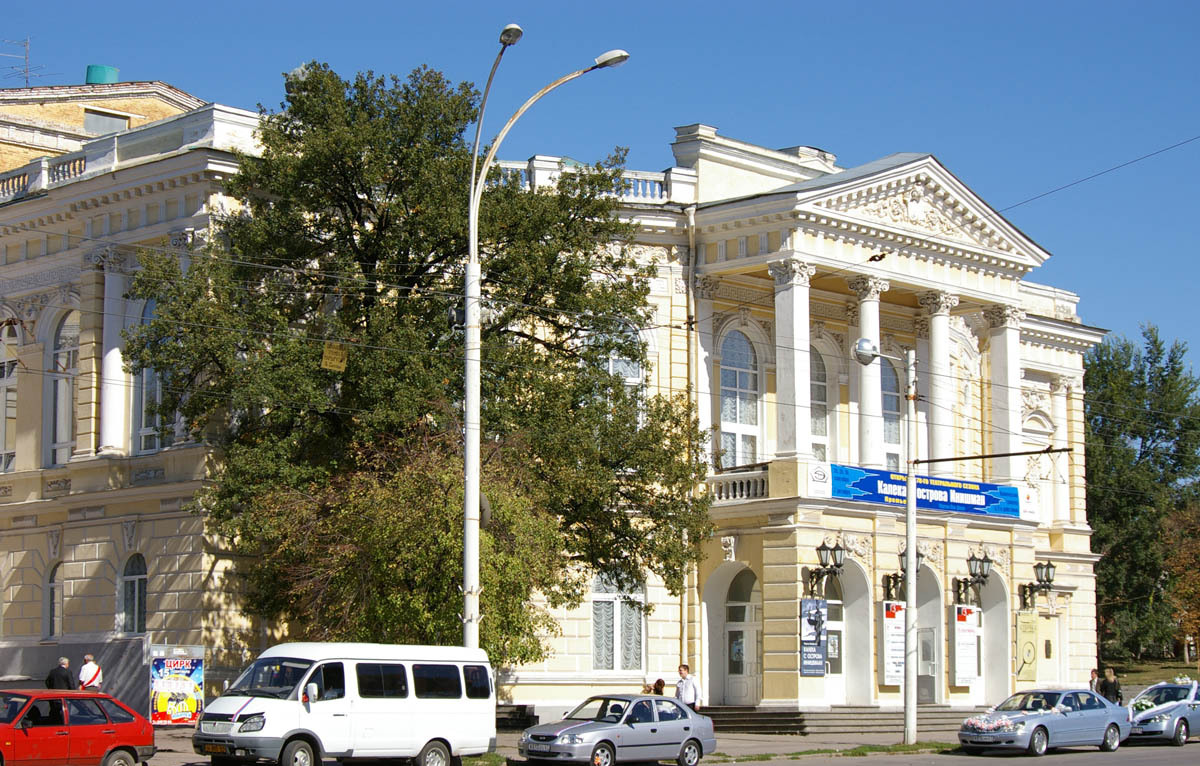
Rostov Regional Academic Theater of the Youth

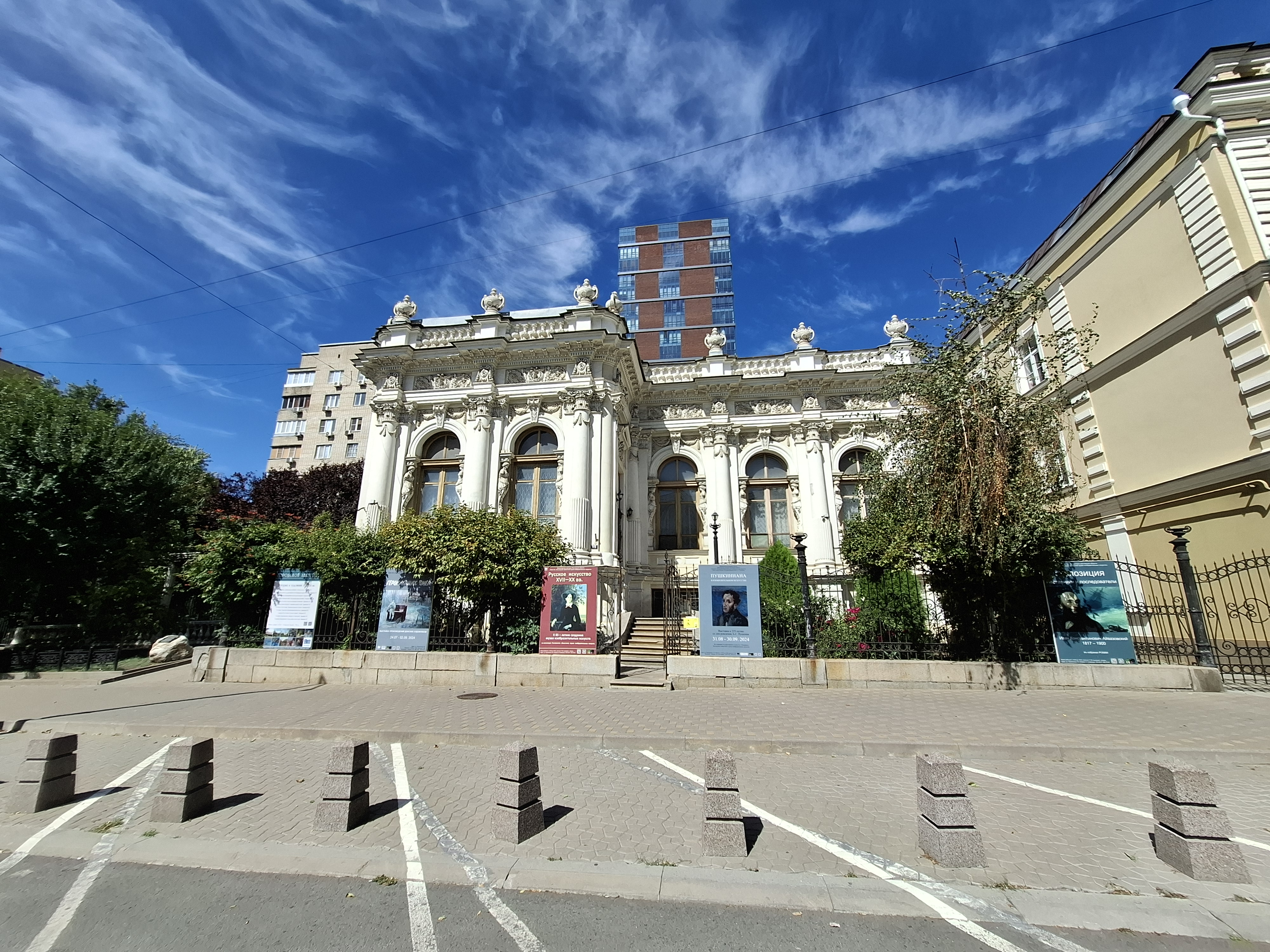
Rostov Regional Museum of Fine Arts

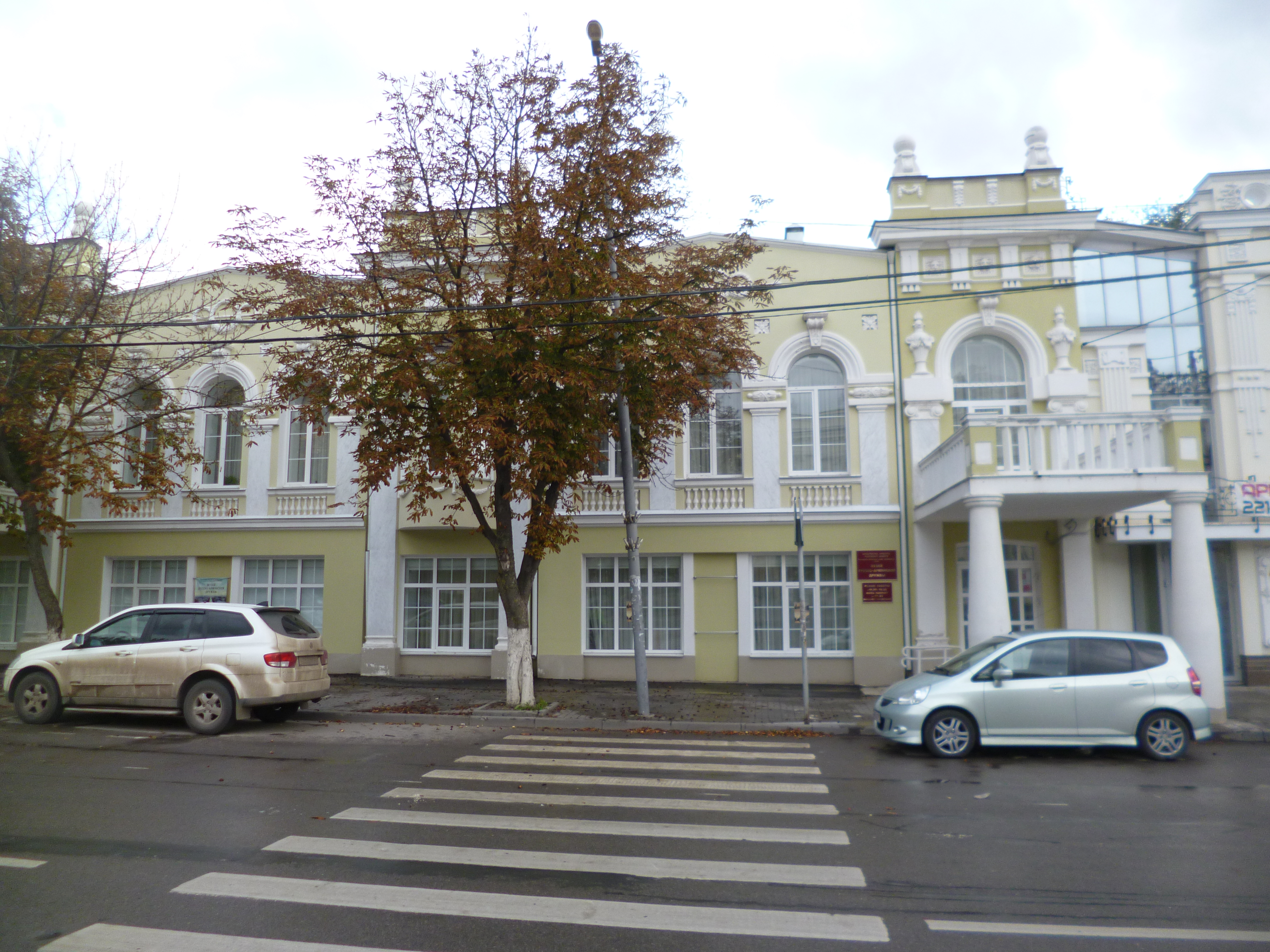
Museum of Russian & Armenian Friendship

The most conspicuous architectural feature of the central part of the city is the Cathedral of the Nativity of the Blessed Virgin Mary (1860–1887), designed by Konstantin Thon.

=== Libraries ===
Rostov-on-Don's libraries include:

- The Don State Public Library,
- Central Library named after Maxim Gorky,
- Regional Children's Library named after V.M. Velichkina
- Rostov Regional Special Library for the Blind,
- Scientific Library of the Medical University,
- Central State Children's Library named after Lenin
- Children's Library named after A.S. Pushkin
- Children's Library named after Mayakovsky
- South-Russian Don State Public Library.

=== Theaters ===
In the Academic Drama Theater named after Maxim Gorky works Mikhail Bushnov, who is the national artist of the USSR and an honorary citizen of Rostov-on-Don.

- Maxim Gorky Academic Drama Theater
- Rostov State Puppet Theater
- Rostov Regional Academic Theater of the Youth
- Rostov Musical Theater
- Philharmonic centre
- Theater 18+
- Kim Nazaretov jazz centre

=== Museums ===
The small collections of the Art Gallery and the Museum of Arts include some works by Repin, Surikov, Perov, Levitan and Aivazovsky as well as modern Rostov artists.

- Museum of Local Lore
- Rostov Regional Museum of Fine Arts
- Museum of Fine Arts on Dmitrovskaya
- Museum of Russian & Armenian Friendship
- Pioneer and Railway Museum and Children's Railway

=== Other facilities ===
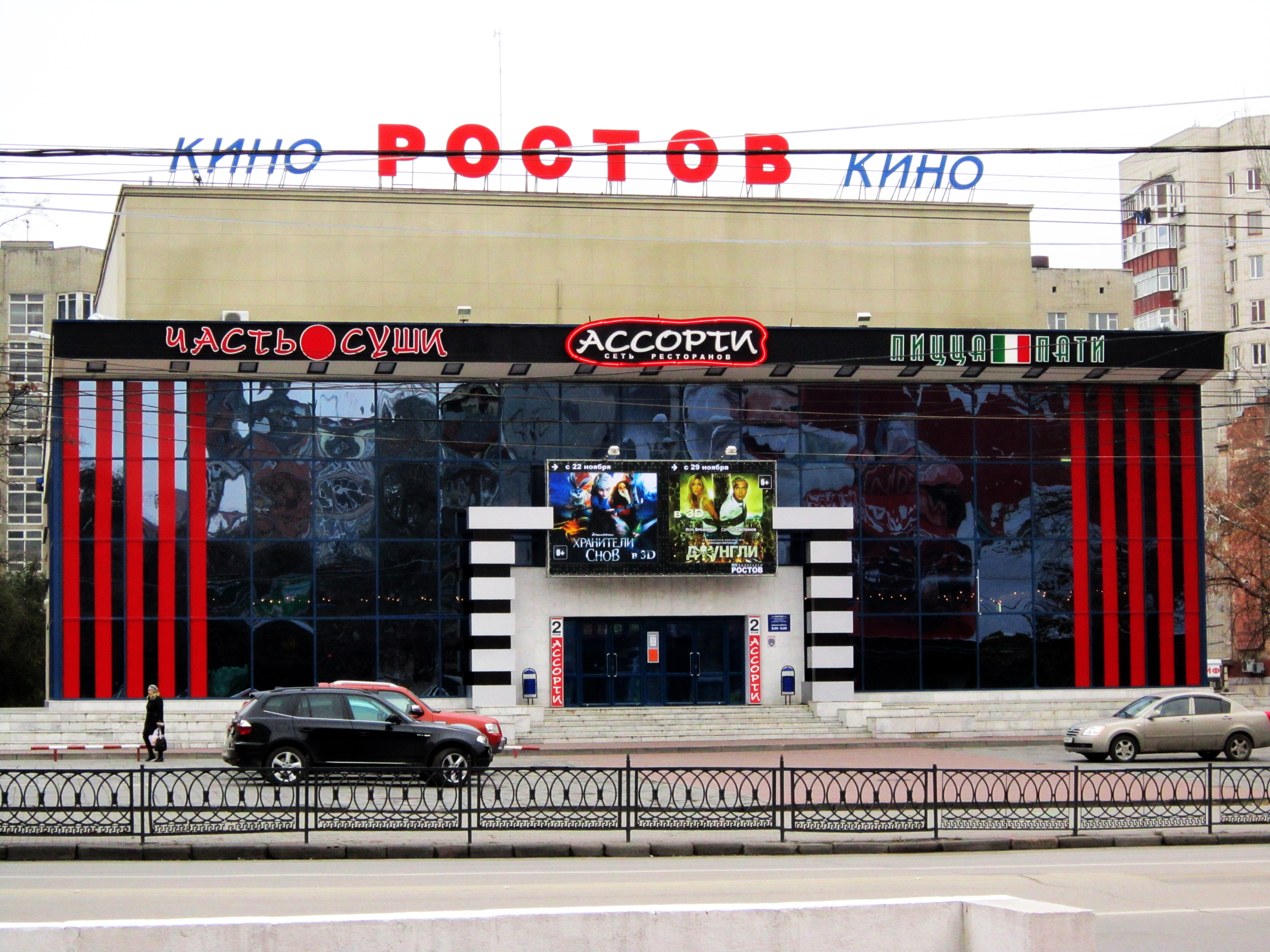
Movie theater in Rostov-on-Don

Other facilities include seven stadiums, a Palace of Sports, a circus, a zoo, botanical gardens and parks. Rostov-on-Don hosts the North Caucasian Science Center and research institutes.

=== Religion ===
The Administration of Rostov and Novocherkassk Eparchy of the Russian Orthodox Church is located in Rostov. Other religious facilities in Rostov-on-Don are the Roman Catholic "Church of the Lord's Supper", the Old Believers' temple, a synagogue, a mosque, and the Diamond Way Buddhist Center of the Karma Kagyu Tradition. There are also several Armenian and Greek Orthodox churches in the city, with one of the Armenian churches being the oldest standing building in Rostov. All of the Armenian churches are in the Nakhichevan-on-Don district of the city. Rostov-on-Don is also home to a number of Orthodox churches.

=== Russian Orthodox churches ===
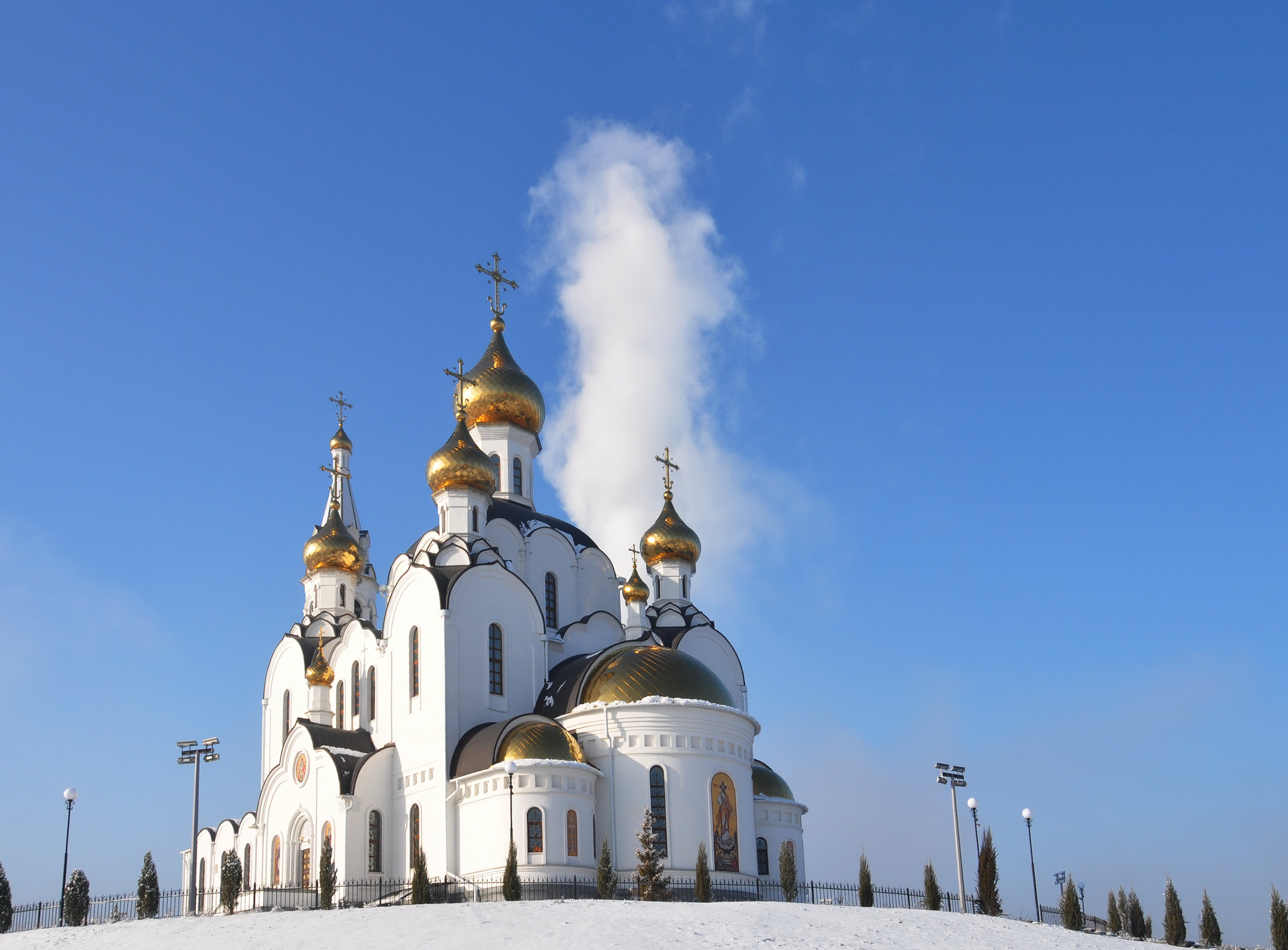
The temple of the Holy Trinity in Rostov-on-Don is made in the style of ancient Russian architecture; its facade is decorated with bright mosaics, and inside is a majestic altar with paintings.

- Church of the Intercession
- Annunciation Greek Orthodox Church (belongs to Moscow Patriarchate)
- St. Alexandra's Church
- Ascension Church
- Cathedral of the Nativity of the Blessed Virgin Mary
- Church of St. John of Kronstadt, Rostov-on-Don

=== Old Believers churches ===
- Old Believers Pokrovsky Cathedral

=== Armenian Apostolic Church ===
- Church of the Resurrection, Rostov-on-Don

=== Synagogues ===
See also List of synagogues in Russia and History of the Jews in Rostov-on-Don

- Soldier Synagogue, currently home to the Rostov Jewish Community and the only active synagogue in Rostov-on-Don
- Main Choral Synagogue, no longer in active use as a synagogue
- The Artisans' Synagogue, destroyed by fire during WWII, formerly located at 106 Stanislavskogo St.

=== Mosques ===
- Cathedral Mosque

=== Gallery ===
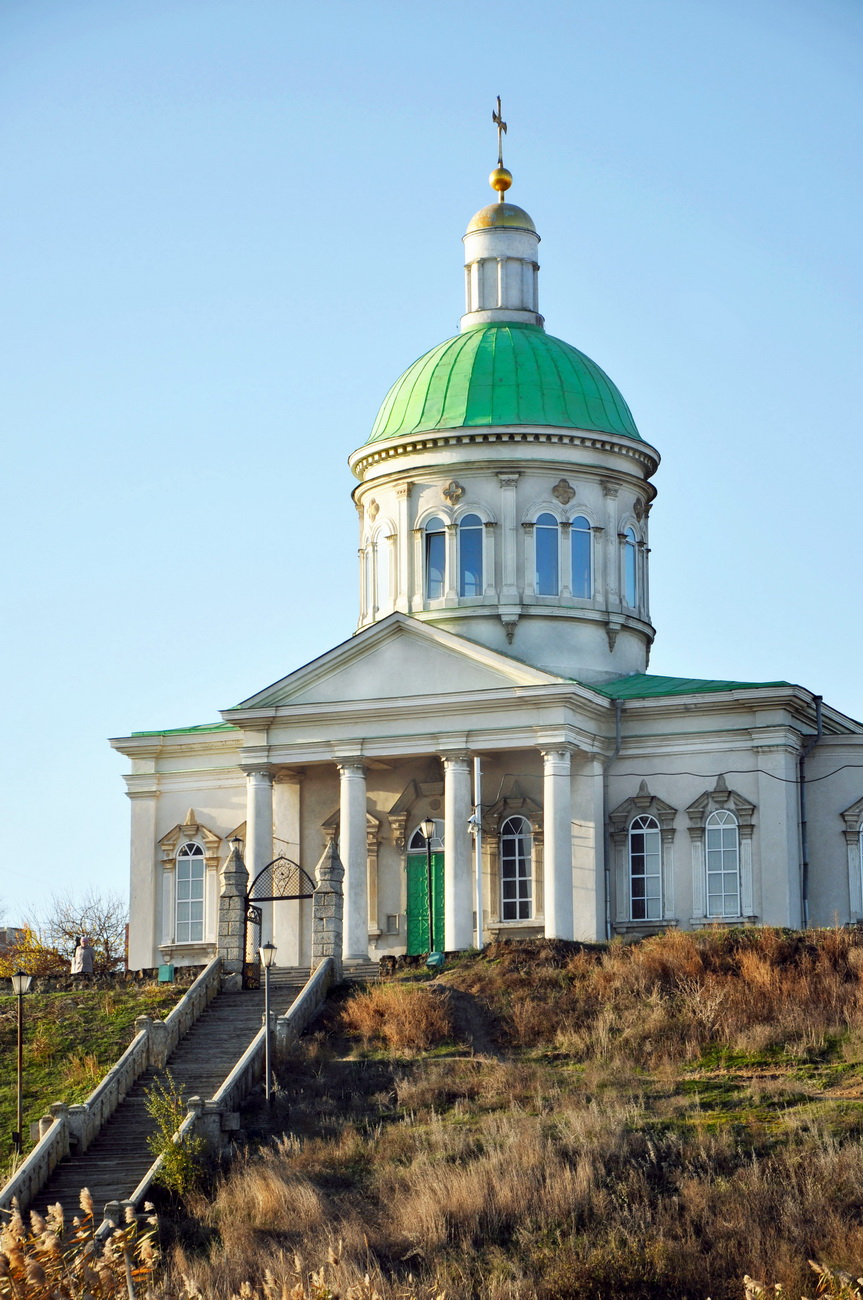
Armenian Apostolic Church of the Holy Cross (built in 1792)

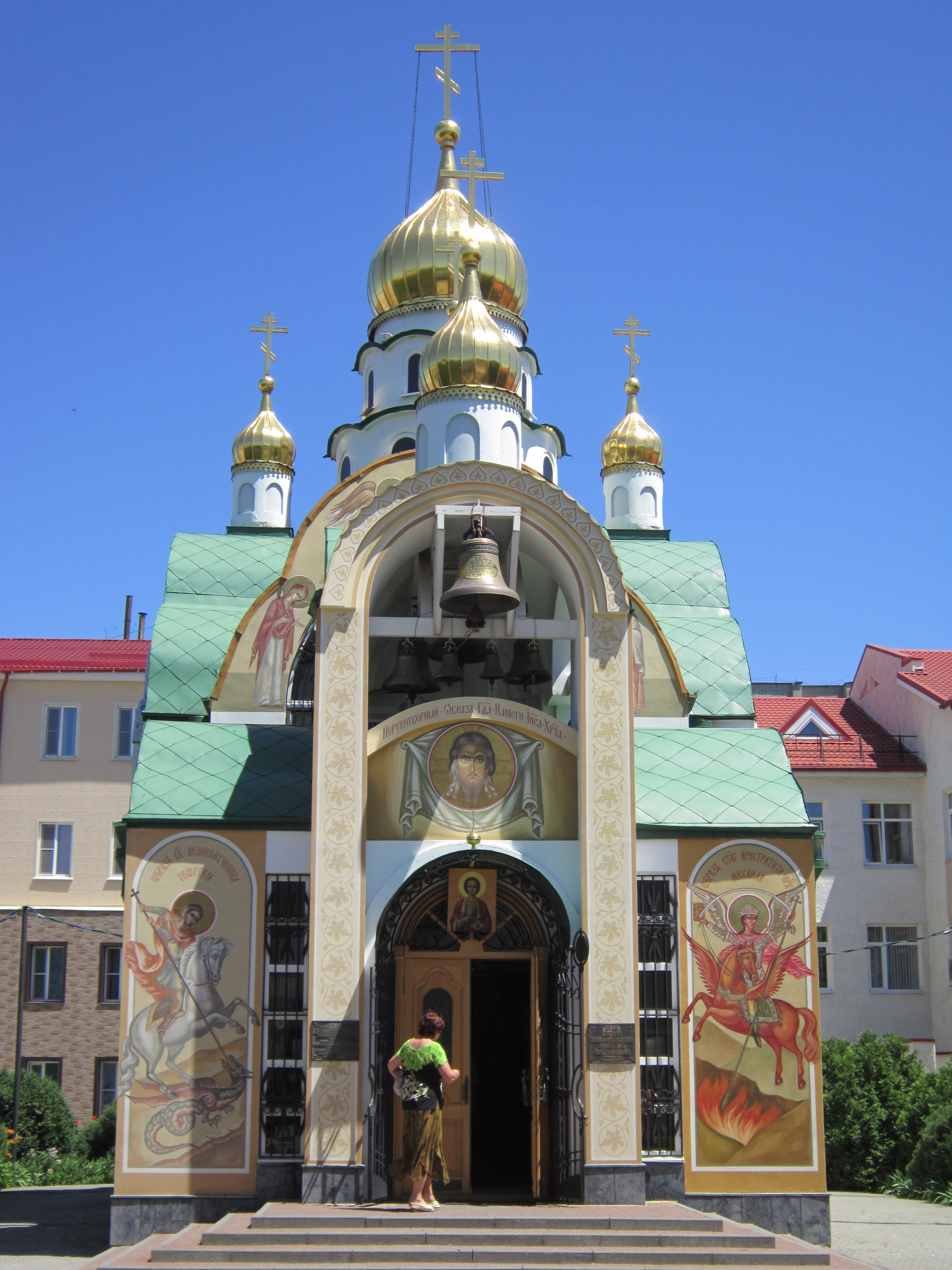
Orthodox Church of Great-Martyr Panteleimon

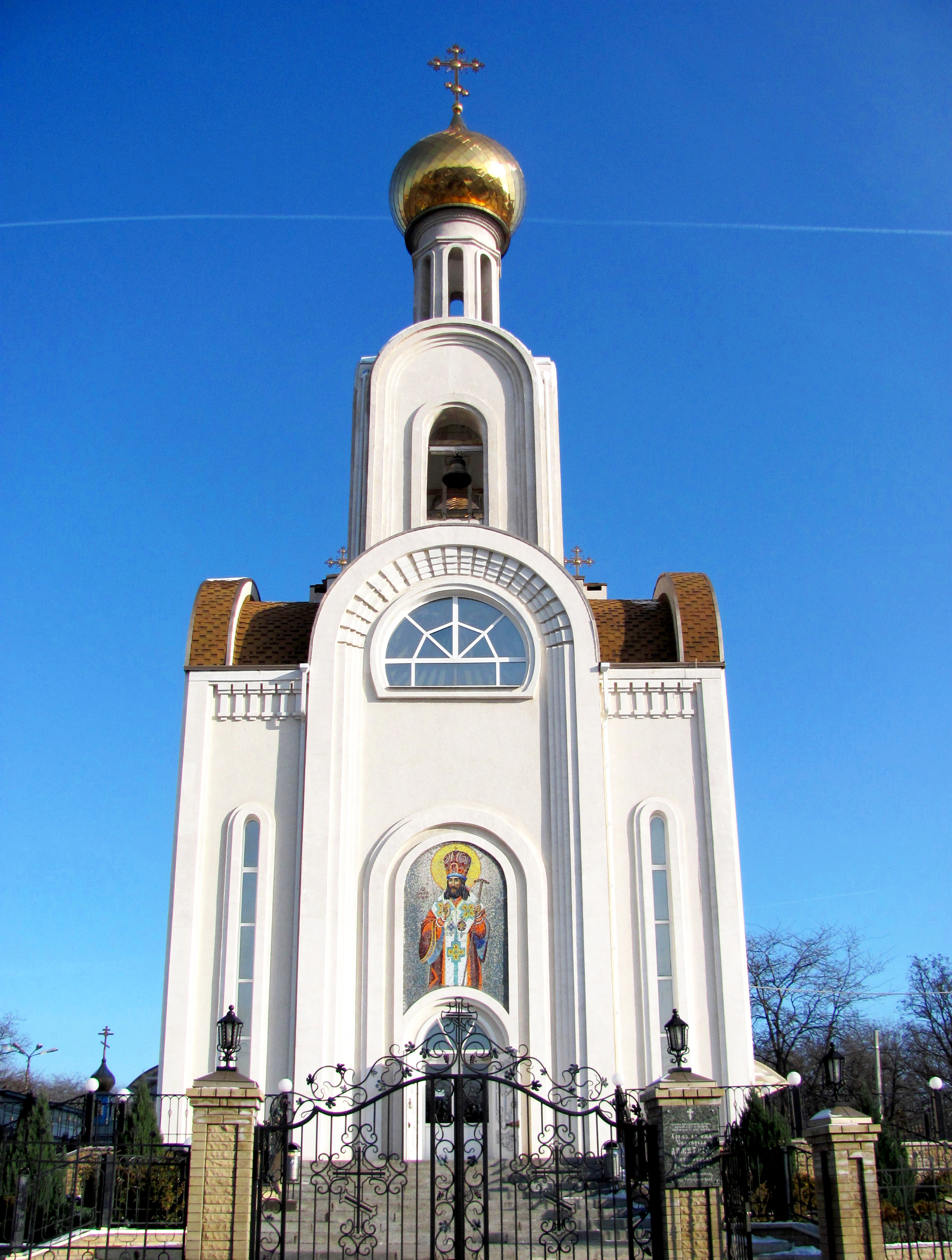
Orthodox Church of Saint Dimitri of Rostov

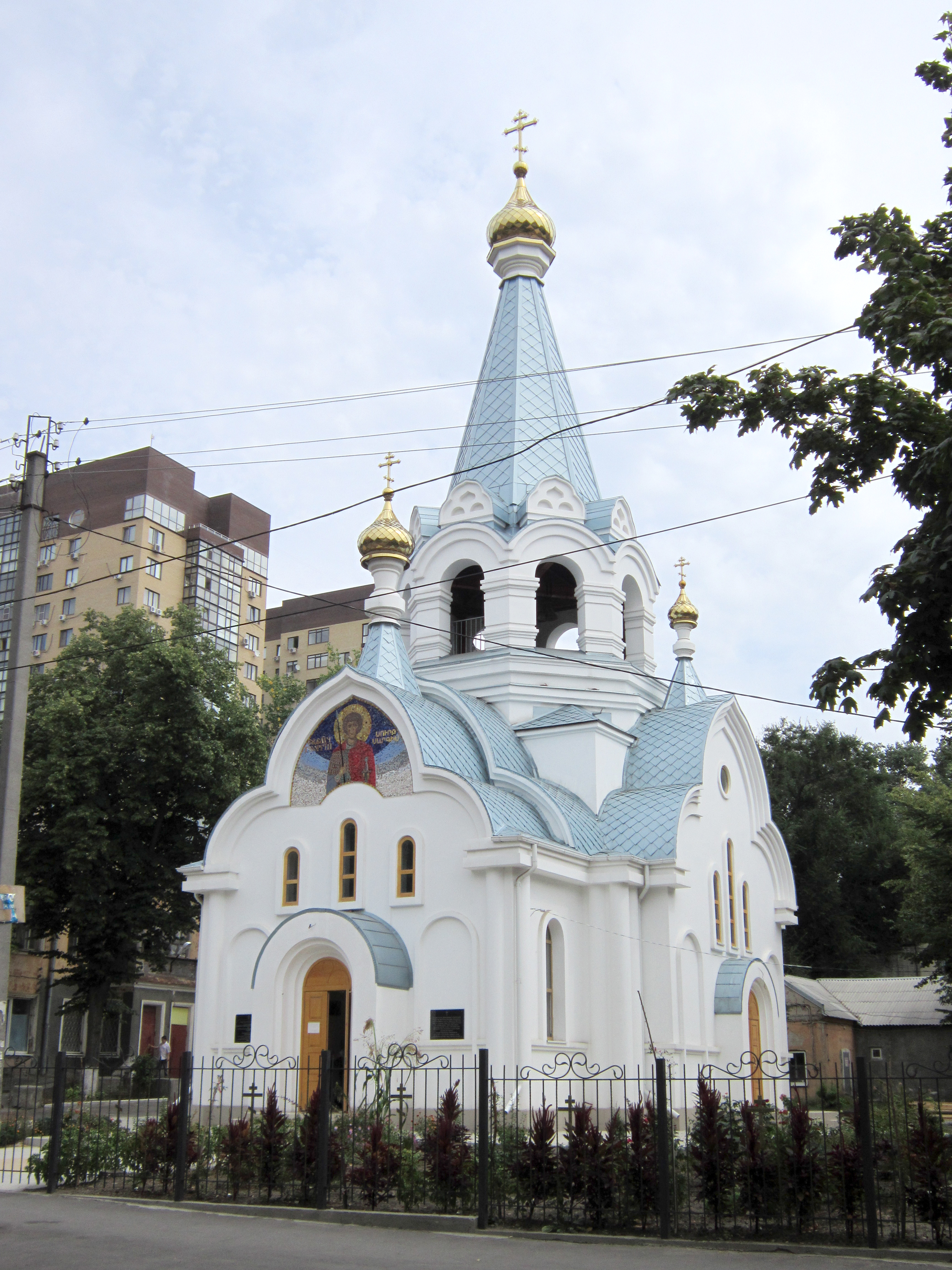
Orthodox Church of Saint George

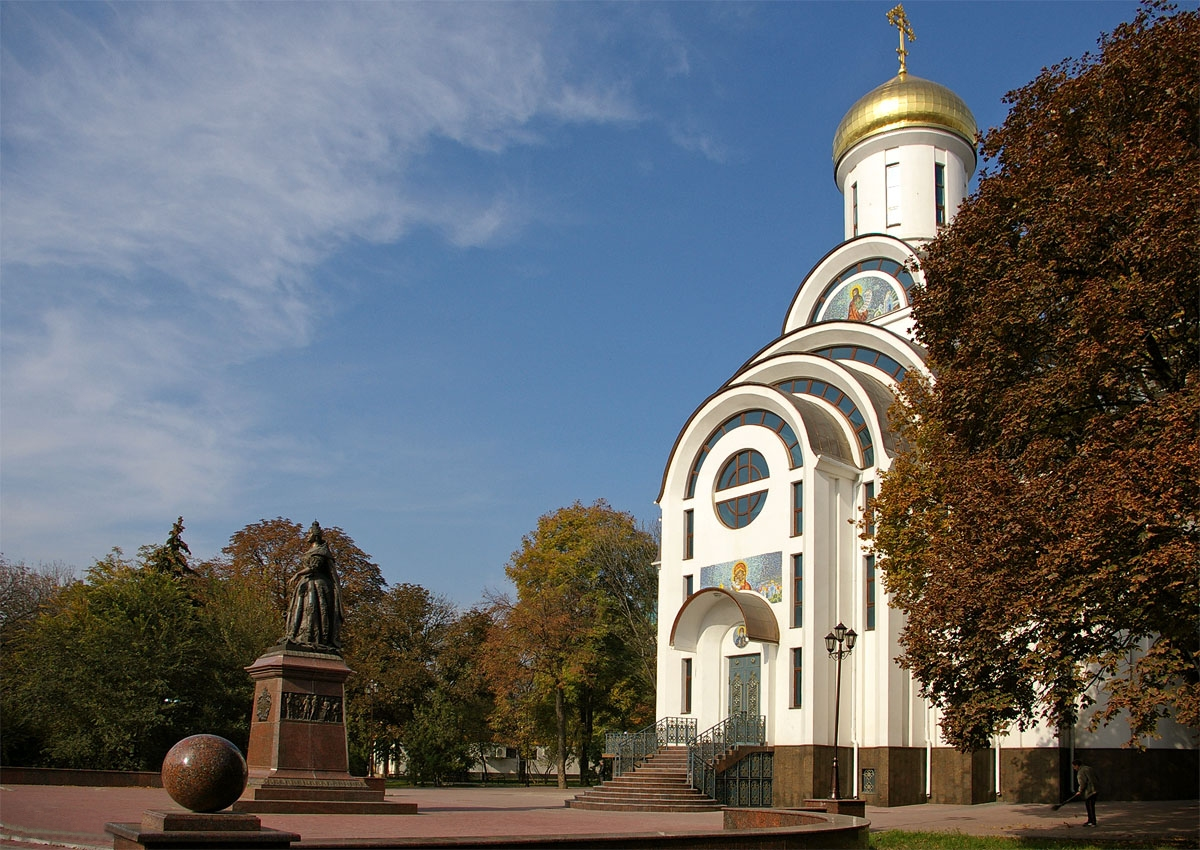
Orthodox Church of the Intercession of the Theotokos

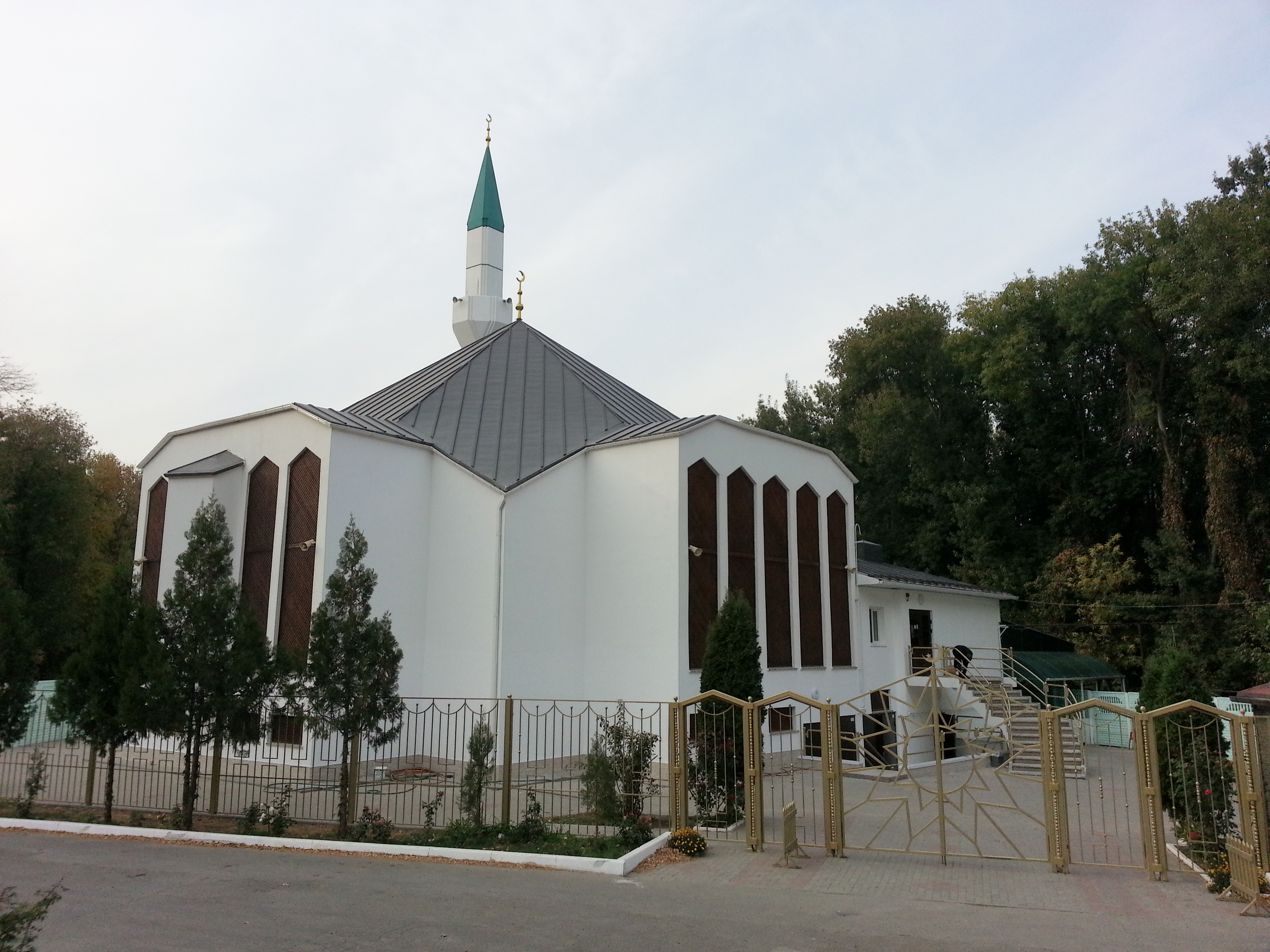
Cathedral Mosque

=== Mass media ===
The construction of the Rostov TV centre began in 1956 and was completed on 26 April 1958. The first television program was broadcast on 30 April 1958. Colour television was first broadcast in 1974. Radio transmission began in Rostov-on-Don on October 17, 1975. In 2009, there were fourteen FM radio stations in Rostov-on-Don. It is also possibly the home of the Squeaky Wheel number station.

== Sports ==
Rostov-on-Don was one of the host cities for the 2018 FIFA World Cup.

Club	Sport	Founded	Current league	League Tier	Stadium
FC Rostov	Football	1930	Men's Premier League	1st	Rostov Arena
SKA Rostov-on-Don	Football	1937	Men's Professional Football League	3rd	SKA SKVO Stadium
Rostov-Don	Basketball	2006	Women's Super League	2nd	Express CSC
Rostov-Don	Handball	1965	Woman's Handball Championship	1st	Rostov-on-Don Palace of Sports
HC Rostov	Ice hockey	2004	Men's Hockey League	2nd	Rostov-on-Don Palace of Sports

=== 2018 FIFA World Cup ===
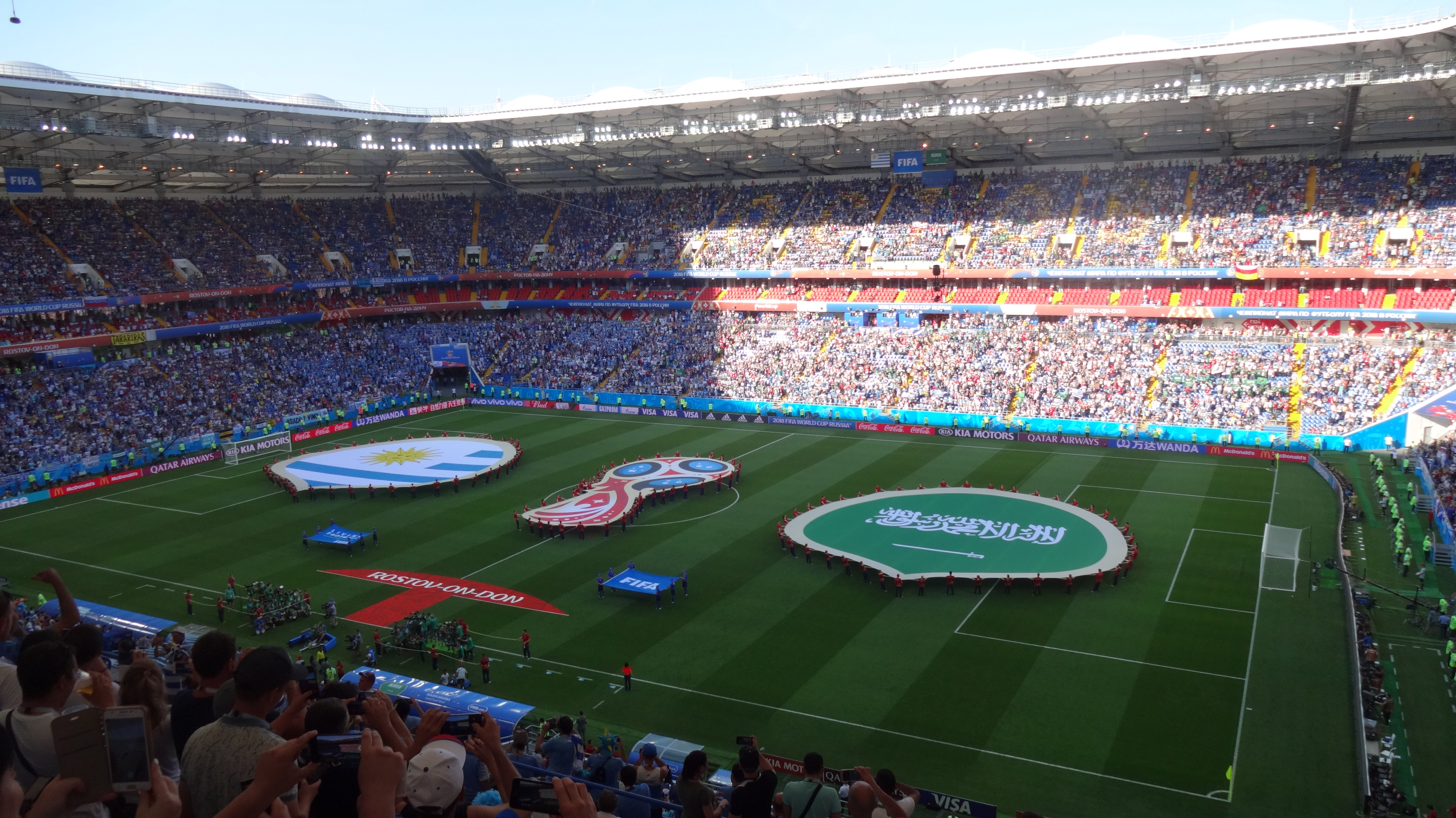
Uruguay–Saudi Arabia match on 20 June 2018

In 2018, Rostov-on-Don was one of the Russian cities to host the 2018 FIFA World Cup. Rostov Arena with a capacity of 45,000 spectators was built on the left bank of the Don River, left of the exit from the city via the Voroshilovsky Bridge. The stadium hosted 5 games of the FIFA World Cup.

- June 17, 21:00, Brazil — Switzerland, Group E
- June 20, 18:00, Uruguay — Saudi Arabia, Group A
- June 23, 18:00, South Korea — Mexico, Group F
- June 26, 21:00, Iceland — Croatia, Group D
- July 2, 21:00, Belgium — Japan, Round of 16

During the FIFA World Cup, Teatralnaya Square served as a venue for the FIFA Fan Fest. The specially arranged area had a capacity of 25,000 people. Fans were able to watch all World Cup games on a big screen. The venue was serviced by food outlets and had several entertainment areas. In preparation for the FIFA World Cup, the city implemented a large-scale development program. Apart from the new stadium, the city built a camping area for fans arriving for the World Cup, the Southern and Western Bypasses, and new hotels. Reconstruction works were carried out at the bridge crossing over the Don River (expanding the traffic way to 6 lanes), a number of healthcare facilities, and the embankment area. A new airport, Yuzhny, was built.

== Notable people ==
Notable people include Olga Spessivtseva, a ballet dancer; Alexander Suvorov, a military commander; Sholom Dovber Schneersohn, the 5th Lubavitcher Rebbe; Yelena Produnova, an artistic gymnast; Yulia Belokobylskaya, an artistic gymnast; Andrei Chikatilo (1936–1994), the serial killer; Alexander Pechersky (1909–1990) a leader of the rebellion at the Sobibor extermination camp, and Maria Kharenkova another artistic gymnast.

=== Writers and poets ===
Authors of Rostov-on-Don include Anton Chekhov, Mikhail Sholokhov, Yuri Kazarnovsky, Zakrutkin, Fadeyev, Safronov, Kalinin, Alexander Pushkin, Maxim Gorky, Sergey Yesenin, Shushanik Kurghinian, Aleksey Nikolayevich Tolstoy, Alexander Solzhenitsyn, Yuri Zhdanov, and Mikael Nalbandian. After visiting Rostov in 1831, Pushkin published his poem "The Don". The monument to Pushkin on Pushkin Boulevard is dedicated to these events. Maxim Gorky, worked as a docker in Rostov-on-Don in his youth. Vera Panova (1905–1973) was a Soviet-era writer. The modern era includes such names as Danil Korezky and Tony Vilgotsky. A monument to Aleksandr Solzhenitsyn, who lived in the city for 18 years and studied mathematics at Rostov University, is being planned by city authorities.

A monument to Anton Chekhov (see Chekhov Monument in Rostov-on-Don) was erected in 2010.

=== Musicians, composers and singers ===
Musicians from Rostov-on-Don include violinist Efrem Zimbalist, Mikhail Gnessin, Semyon-Samuel Zaslavsky, Kim Nazaretov, composer Andrey Pashchenko (1885–1972), film composer Nadezhda Simonyan, Zinaida Petrovna Ziberova (born 1909), pop music singer Irina Allegrova (1952), classical conductor and violist Yuri Bashmet, songwriter and disc jockey Bogdan Titomir (1967), Eva Rivas (1987), Mikhail Puntov (1995), the post-punk rock band Motorama, rapper Basta, and the rap band Kasta.

=== Actors, directors and playwrights ===
Actors and playwrights of Rostov-on-Don include Maretskaya, Mikhail Shchepkin, Yevgeniya Glushenko, Alexander Kaidanovsky (1946–1995), Evgeny Shvarts (1896–1958), Nikolai Sorokin (1952–2013), Konstantin Lavronenko (1961), film and theater director Kirill Serebrennikov (1969) winner of the Best Actor award at the 2007 Cannes Film Festival, and Sergey Zhigunov (1963). Marion Gering, noted for his stage and film productions in the United States, was born in the city.

=== Architects and artists ===
Architects and artists of the city include Yevgeny Vuchetich, Seyran Khatlamajyan, Ashot Melkonian, Natalia Duritskaya, Martiros Saryan (1880–1972), Roman Chatov (1900–1987), Leonid Eberg (1882–1954), and Lev Eberg (1907–1982).

=== Scientists and adventurers ===
Scientists and explorers include, doctors N. Bogoraz and S. Fedosov, scientists A. S. Popov, and I. P. Pavlov, George Sedov, the Arctic Sea explorer, Yakov Frenkel (1894–1952), a solid-state physicist, Svyatoslav Fyodorov (1927–2000), ophthalmologist, Sabina Spielrein (1885–1942), psychoanalyst, Viktor Brodyanskiy, chemist, Georgy Flerov, Soviet physicist known for his discovery of spontaneous fission and is the namesake of element 114, flerovium, and Yuri Oganessian (a nuclear physicist who is the namesake of oganesson (element 118)).

=== Other ===
- Iosif Vorovich (1920–2001), mathematician, academician, full member of the Russian Academy of Sciences
- Andrei Chikatilo (1936–94), serial killer
- Vladimir Shumeyko (1945), political figure
- Svetlana Boyko (1972), foil fencer
- Anatoly Morozov (1973), professional association football player and coach
- Alexei Eremenko (1983), Russian-born Finnish professional association football player who currently plays in Kazakhstan
- Victoria Lopyreva (1983), model and popular television hostess
- Oksana Pochepa (1984), pop singer and model
- Tatiana Kotova (1985), beauty pageant titleholder
- Ivan Bukavshin (1995–2016), chess grandmaster
- Igor Eremenko (born 1997), Russian ice dancer who defected to the United States

== Tourism ==
- Central Market, local bazaars and fresh fish markets
- Bridges over the Don river and Don Embankment
- Don River lookout
- Armenian Holy Cross Church
- Rostovchanka statue
- River Steamboat rides
- Orthodox Cathedral of the Nativity of the Holy Virgin
- Pushkinskaya Street
- Maxim Gorky Park
- Traditional Cossack villages (stanitsas)
- National Sholokhov Museum-Reserve
- Azov ancient fortress
- Rostov circus
- Rostov state opera and ballet theatre
- Monastery of St. Jacob
- Rostov Zoo
- Museum of North Caucasus Railway
- Botanical Garden of Southern Federal University
- Art Gallery 16th Line
- Alexander Column
- Grigory and Aksinya in a boat
- Park of Aviators
- October Park
- Anatoly Sobino Park
- Monument to Stepan Razin

=== Historic buildings ===
- Argutinsky-Dolgorukov House
- Bahchisaraytsev House
- Bostrikiny House
- Chernov House
- Chernova House
- Chirikov House
- F. N. Solodov House
- Gavala House
- Gayrabetov Mansion
- Gench-Ogluev House
- Gymnasium №36
- Ivan Zvorykin House
- Kechekyan Mansion
- Kisin House
- Kostanayev House
- Kostin House
- Kramer Mansion
- Krasilnikov Mansion
- Kushnarev House
- Leonidov House
- Lyakhmayer House
- Lyceum № 13
- Main building of Warsaw University
- Maksimov House
- Martyn Brothers House
- Masalitina House
- N. A. Semashko City Hospital No. 1
- North Caucasus Railway Administration Building
- Paramonov Mansion
- Paramonov Mill
- Paramonov Warehouses
- Petrov Mansion
- Pivovarova House
- Popov Mansion
- Reznichenko House
- Sariyev House
- Shirman House
- Soviet South building
- Spielrein Mansion
- Trunov House

== Twin towns/sister cities ==
Rostov-on-Don is twinned with:

- Antalya, Turkey
- Dortmund, Germany
- Gera, Germany
- Donetsk, Ukraine
- Glasgow, Scotland
- Kajaani, Finland
- Le Mans, France
- Minsk, Belarus
- Mobile, United States
- Pleven, Bulgaria
- Seville, Spain
- Volos, Greece
- Yantai, China
- Yerevan, Armenia

== Gallery ==
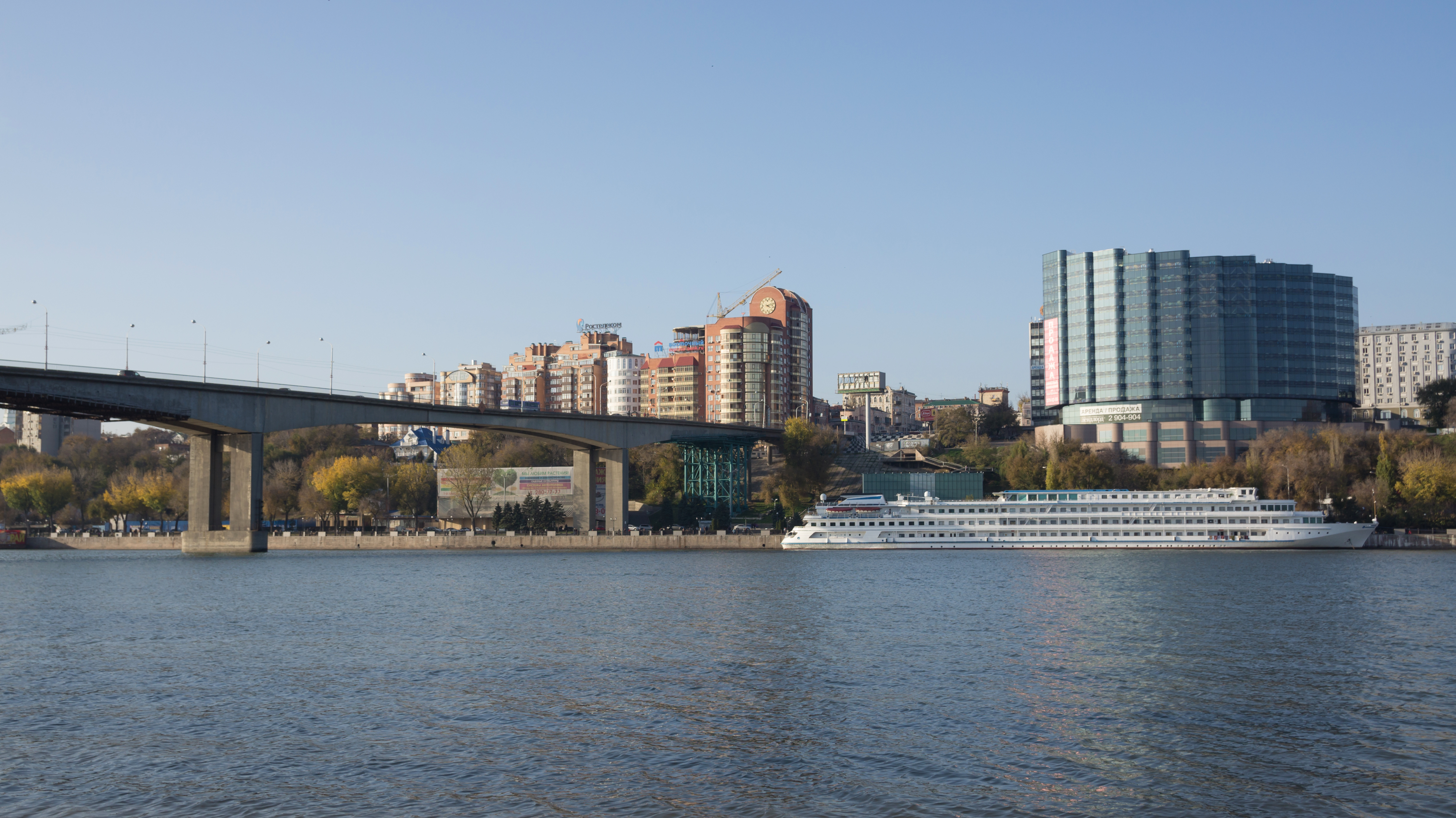
Don River embankment and Old Voroshilovsky Bridge

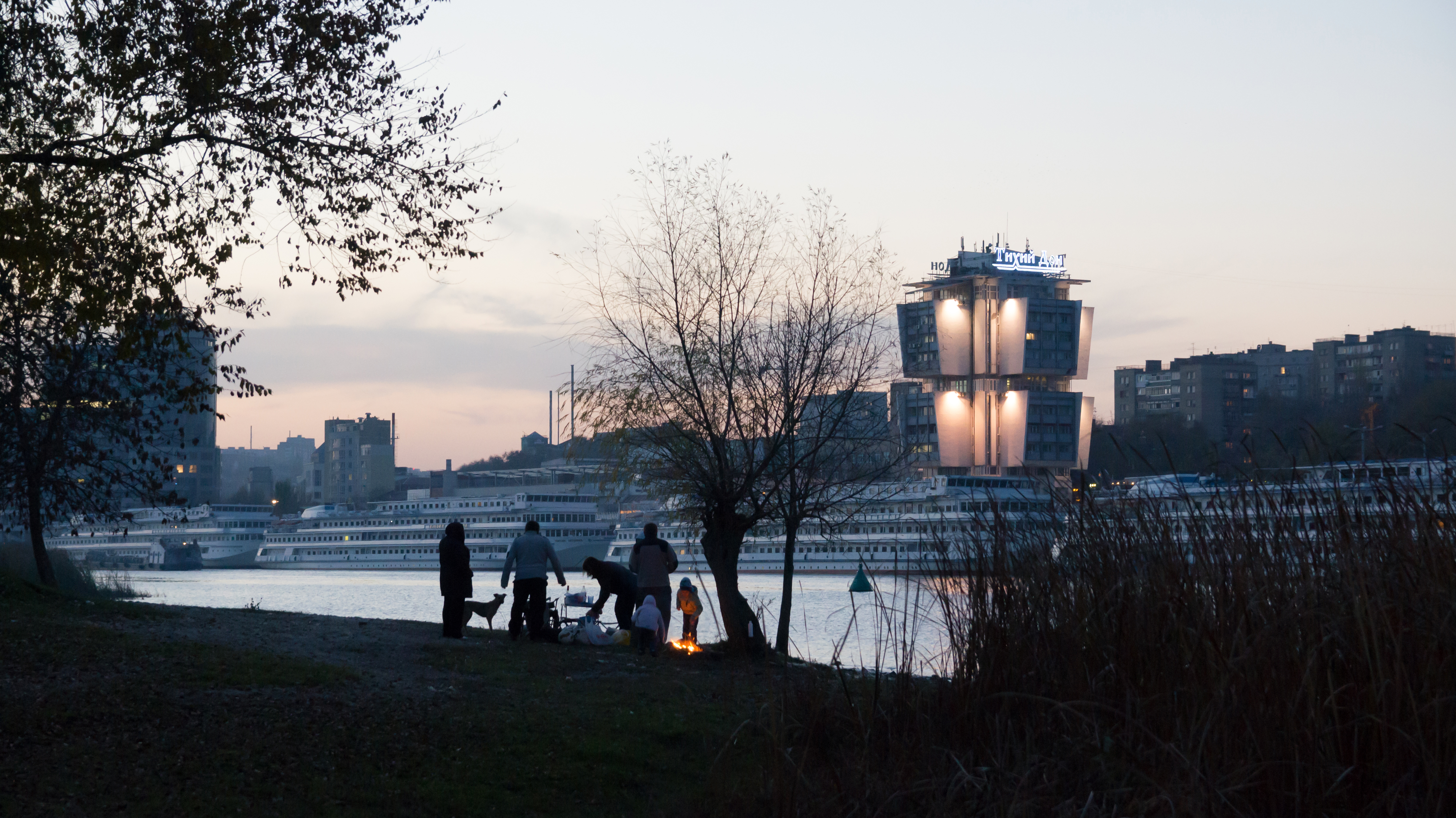
Left bank of Don River

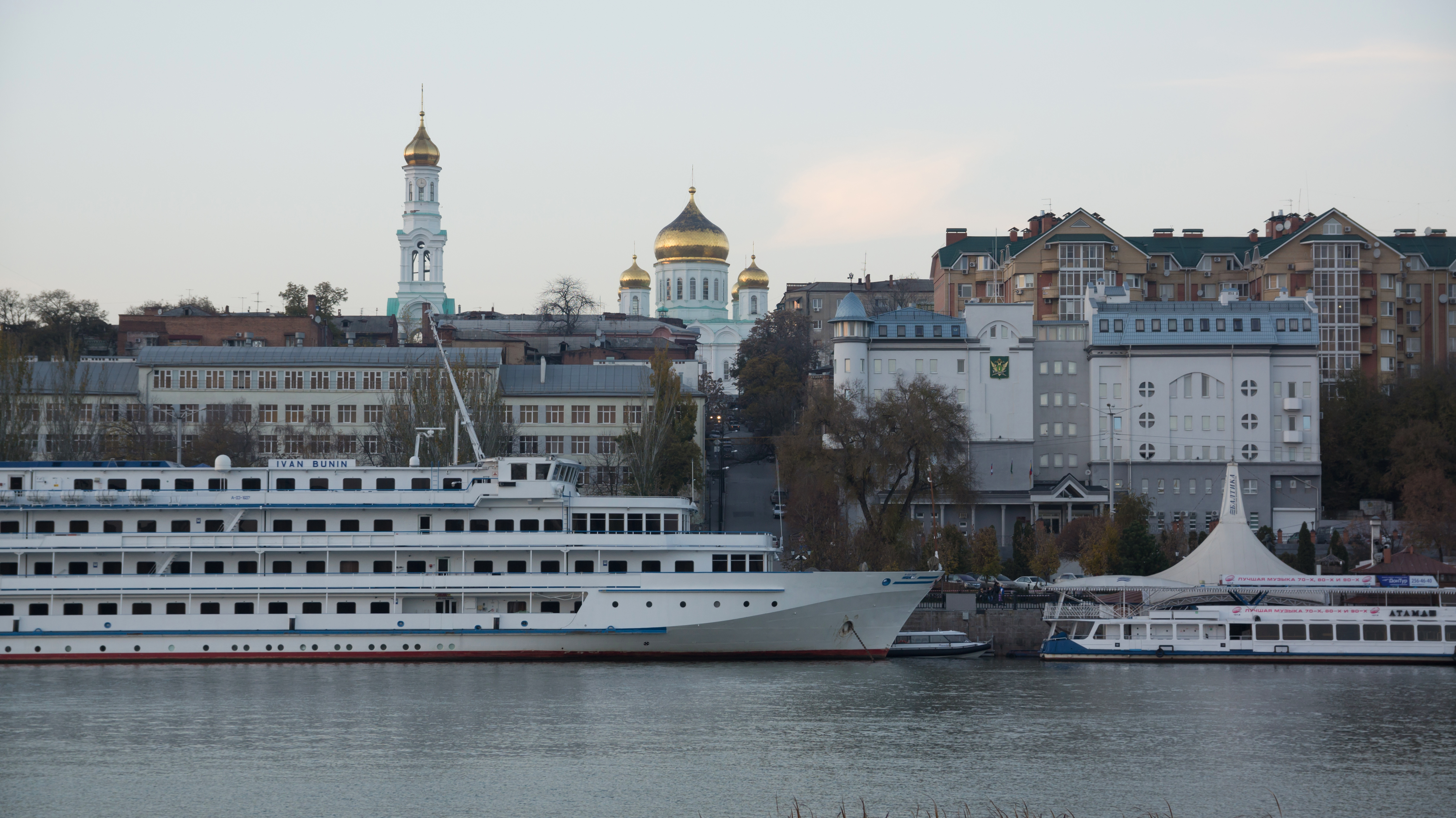
Don River embankment

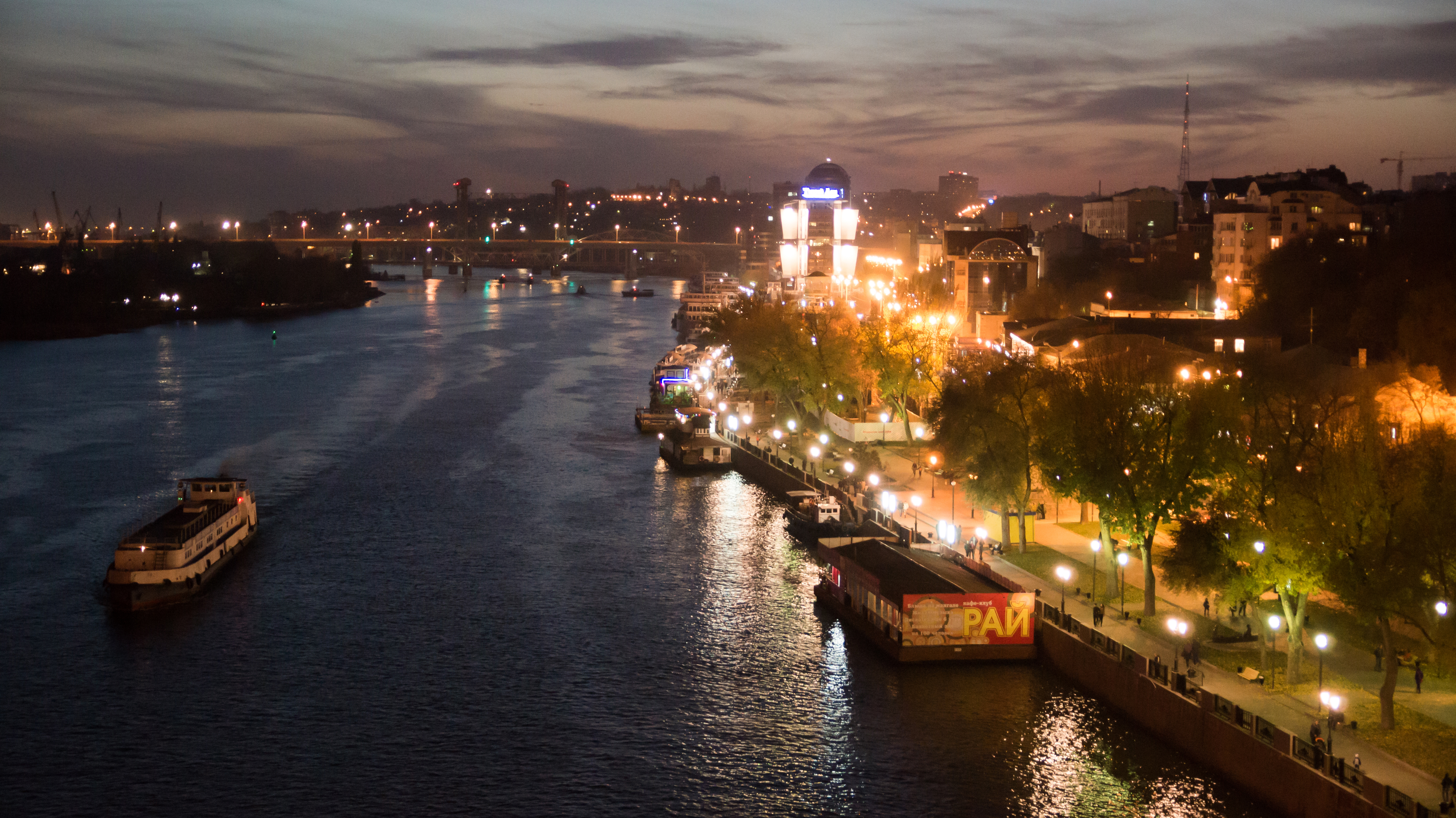
Rostov-on-Don at night

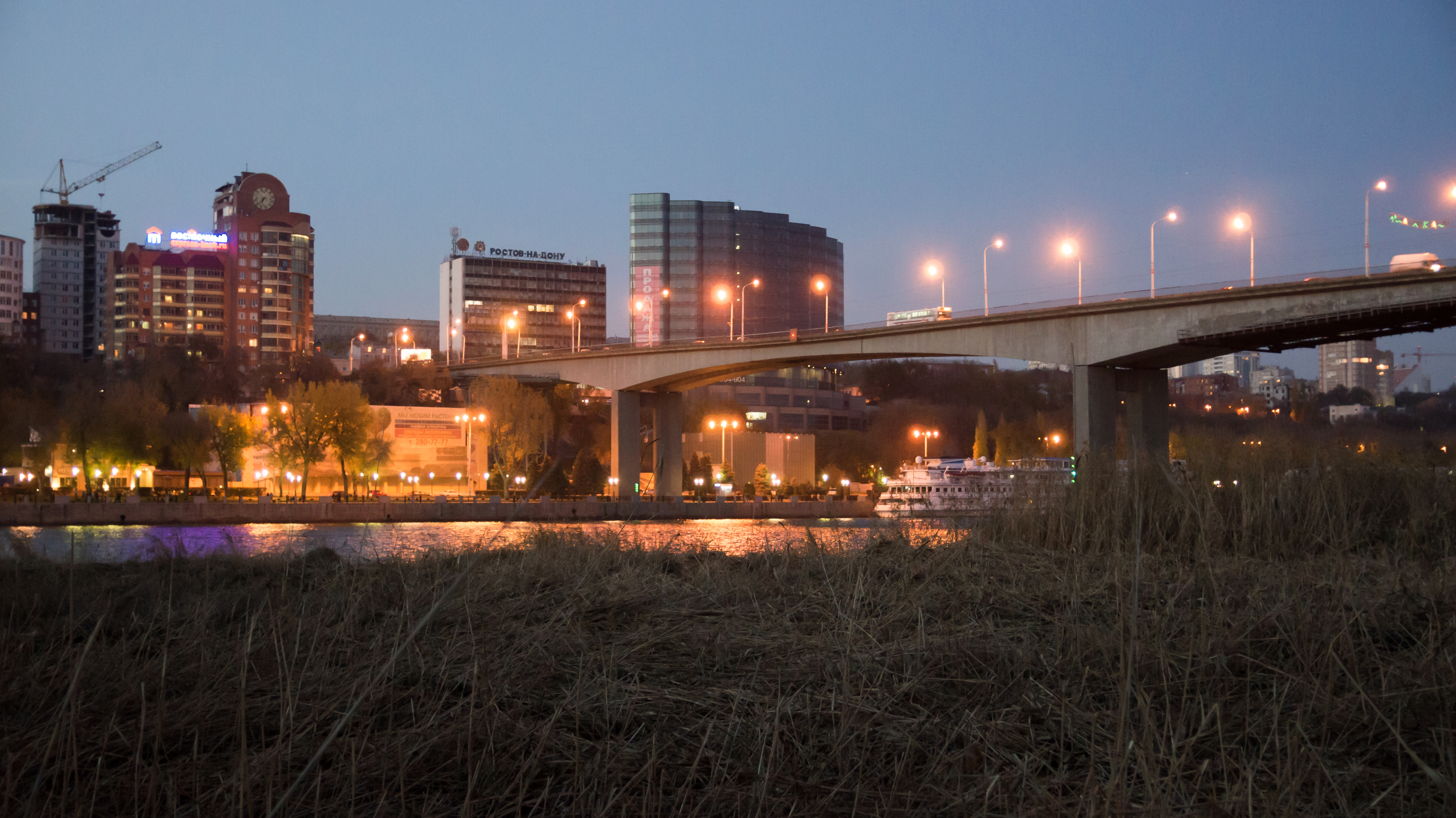
Voroshilovsky Bridge at night

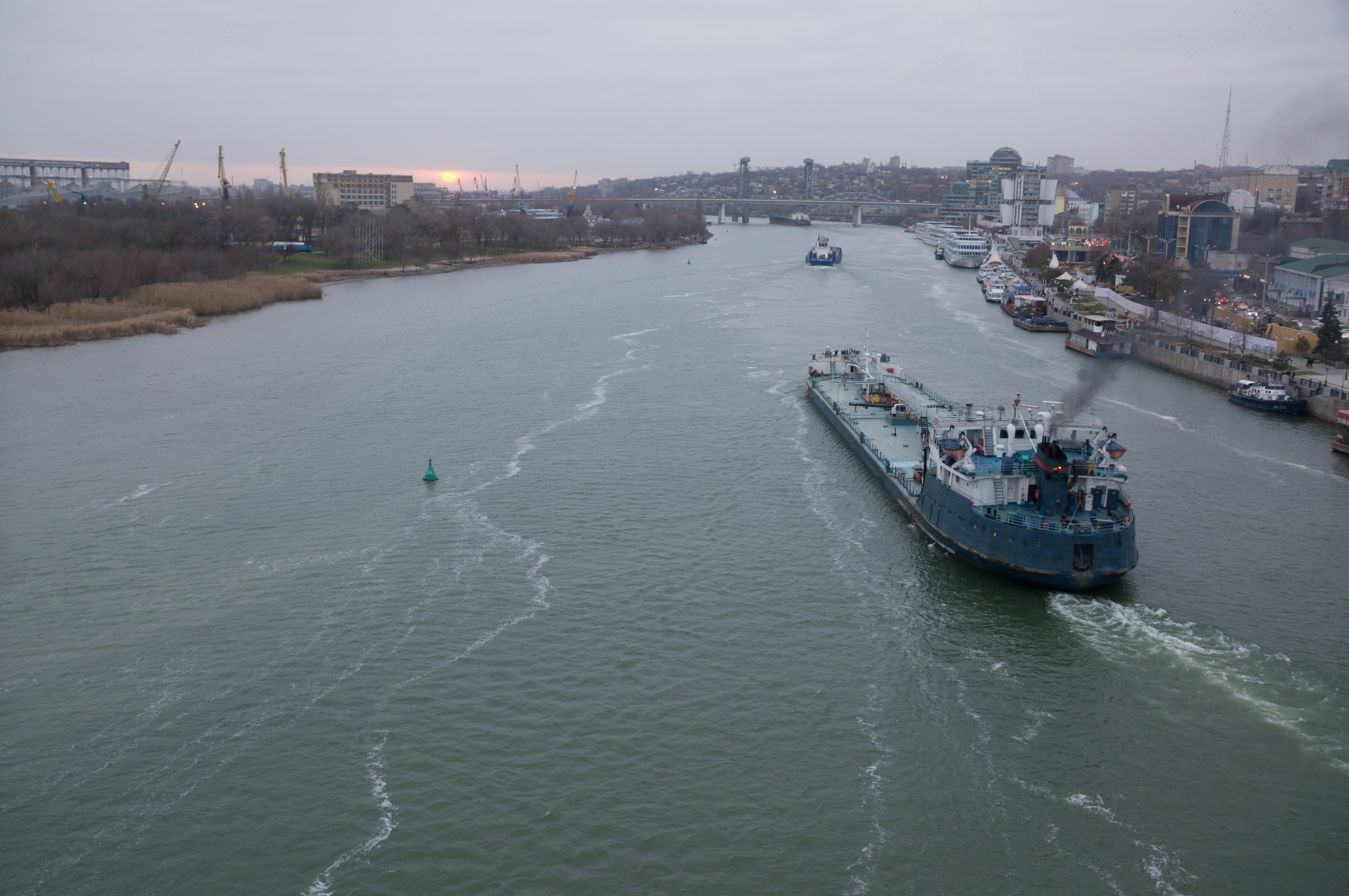
Barge on Don River

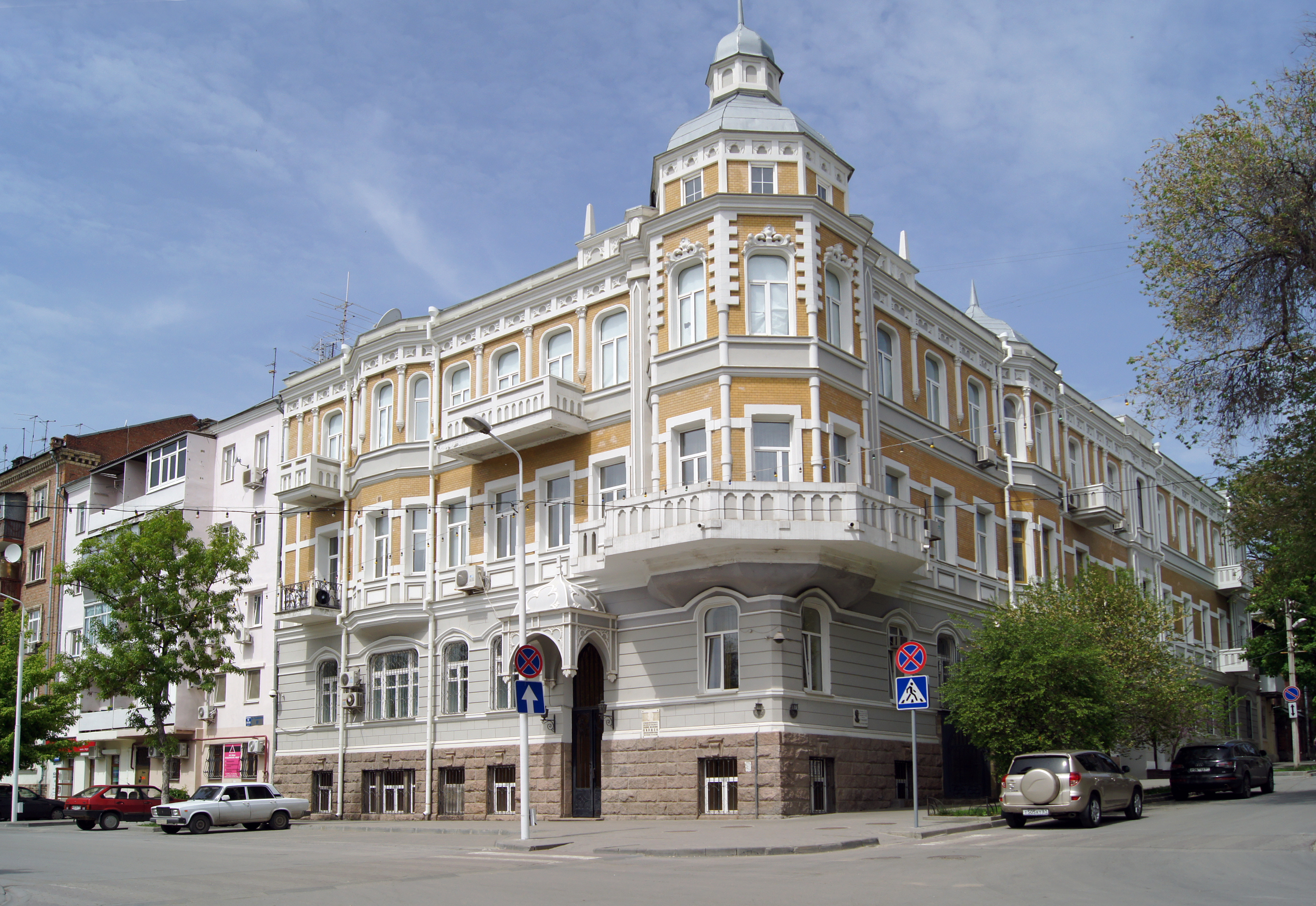
House of P. M. Zaslavskaya

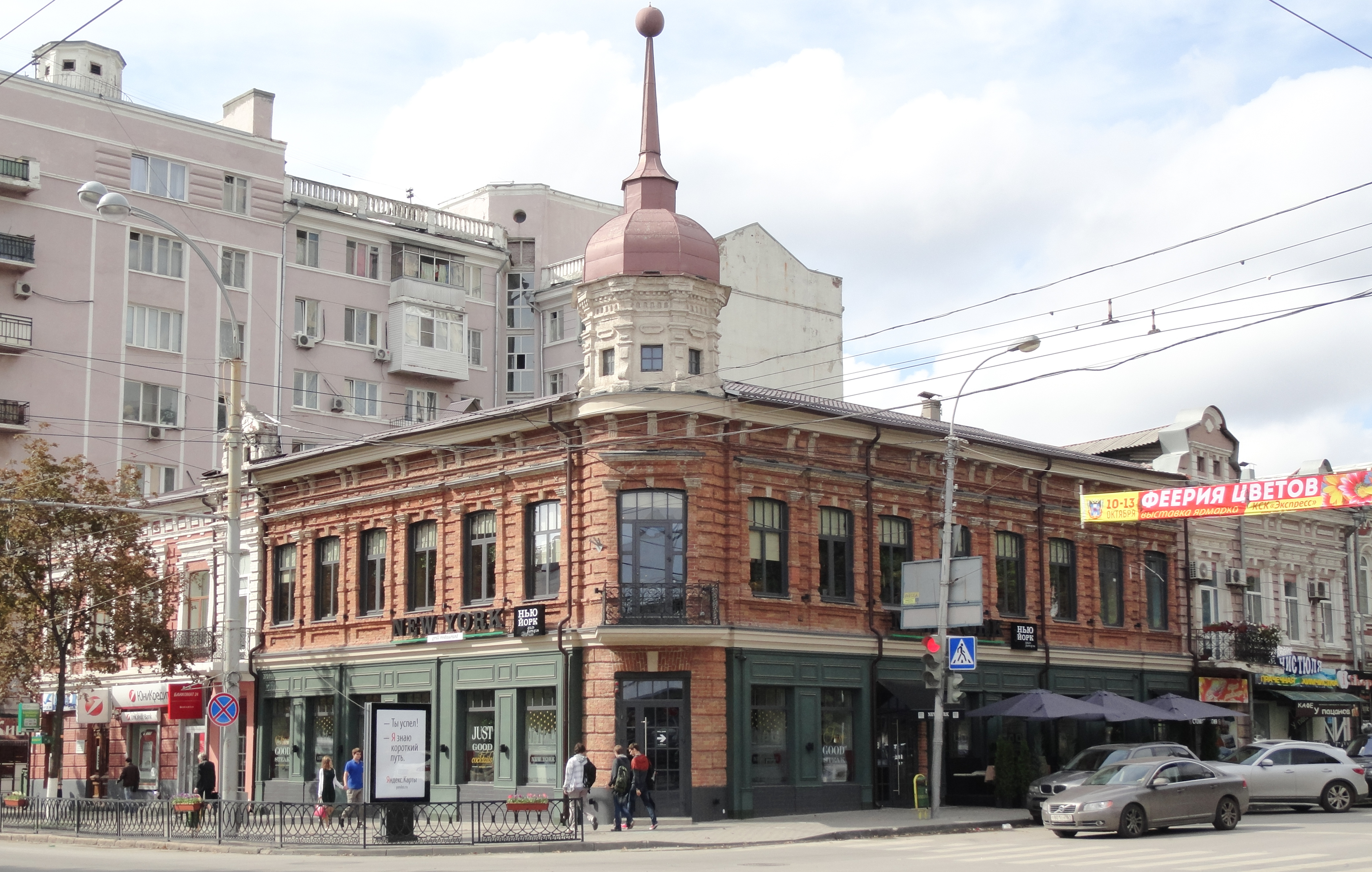
Masalitina House

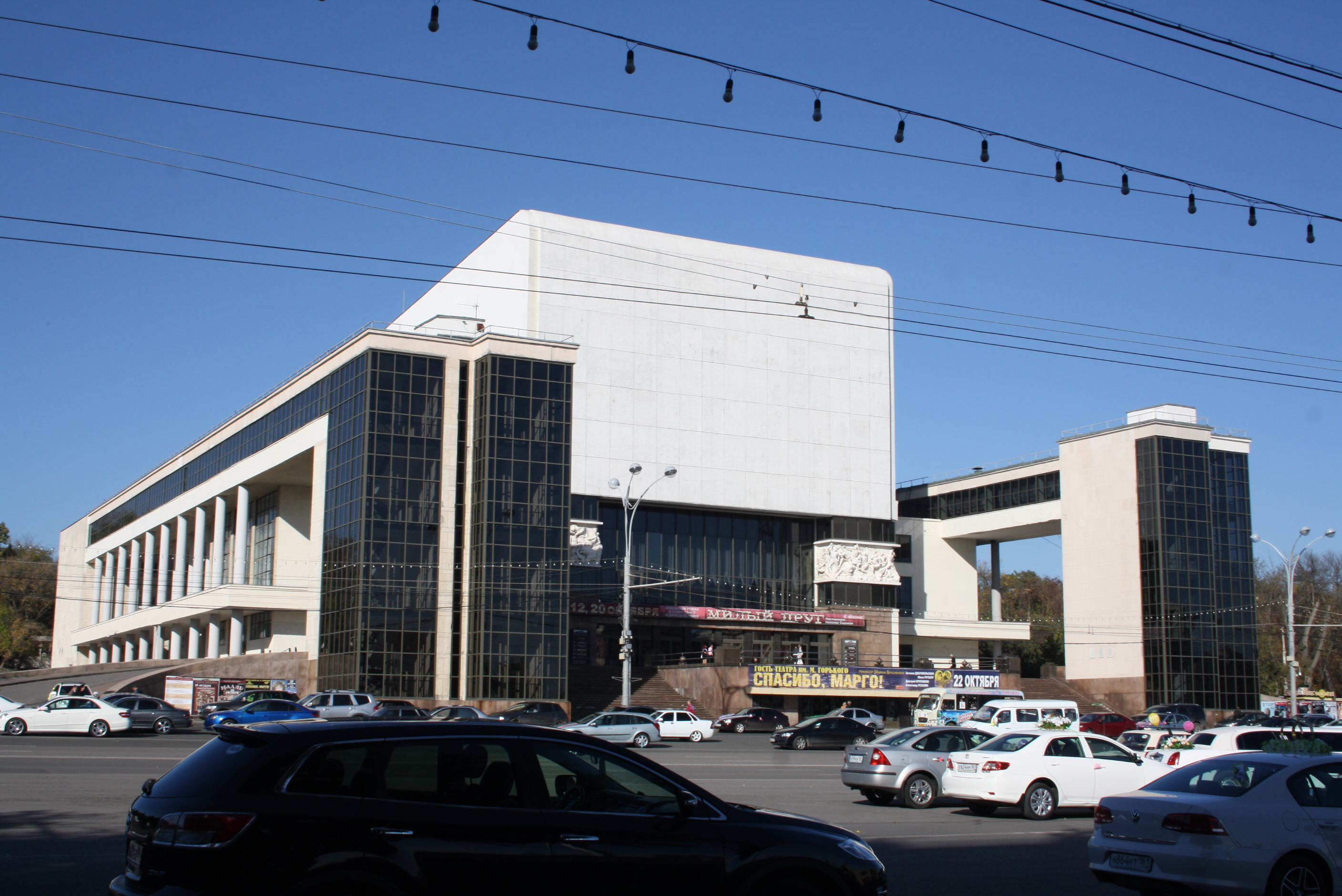
Maxim Gorky theater

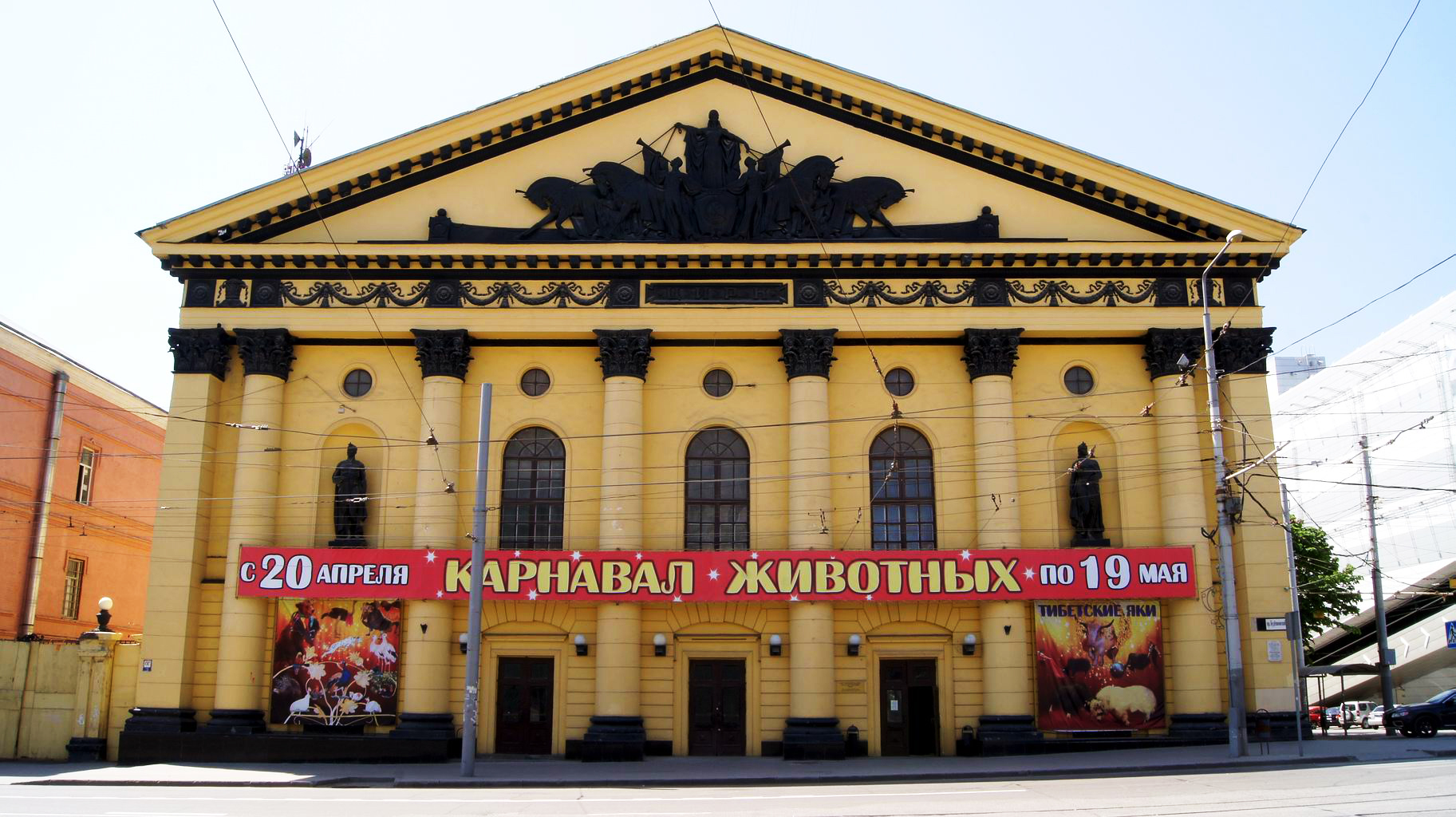
Rostov-on-Don circus

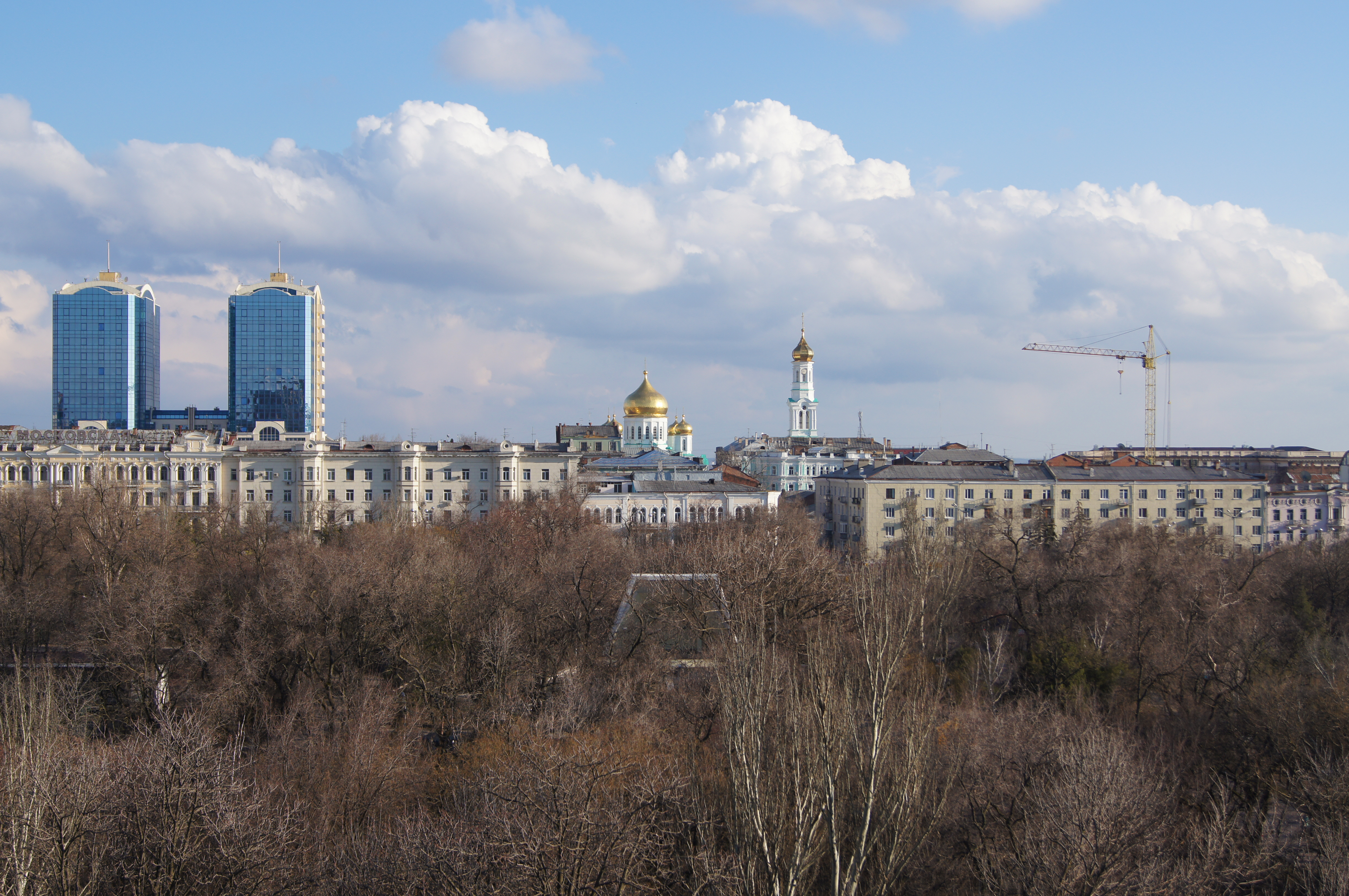
Gorky Park

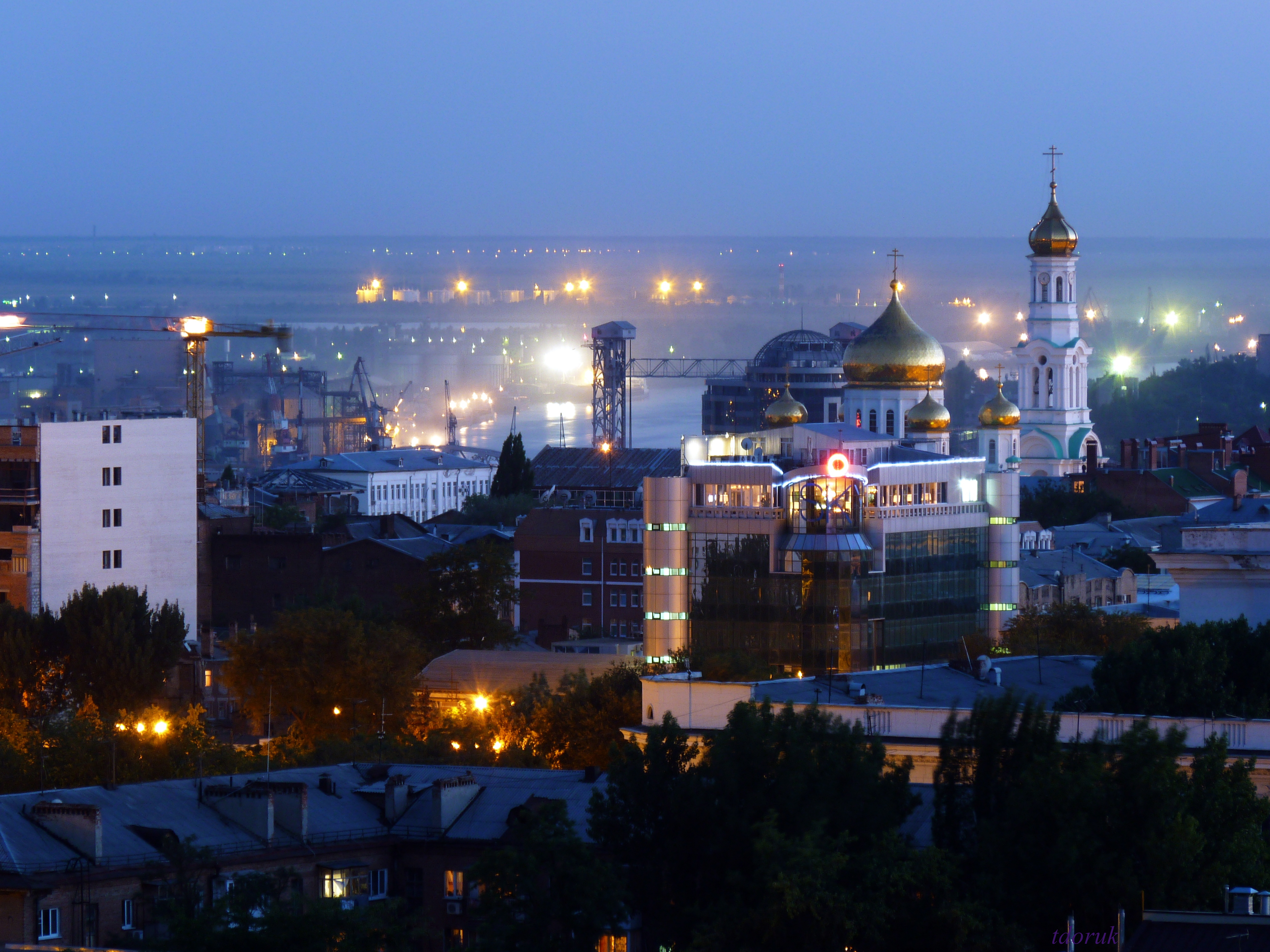
Aerial view of Rostov at night

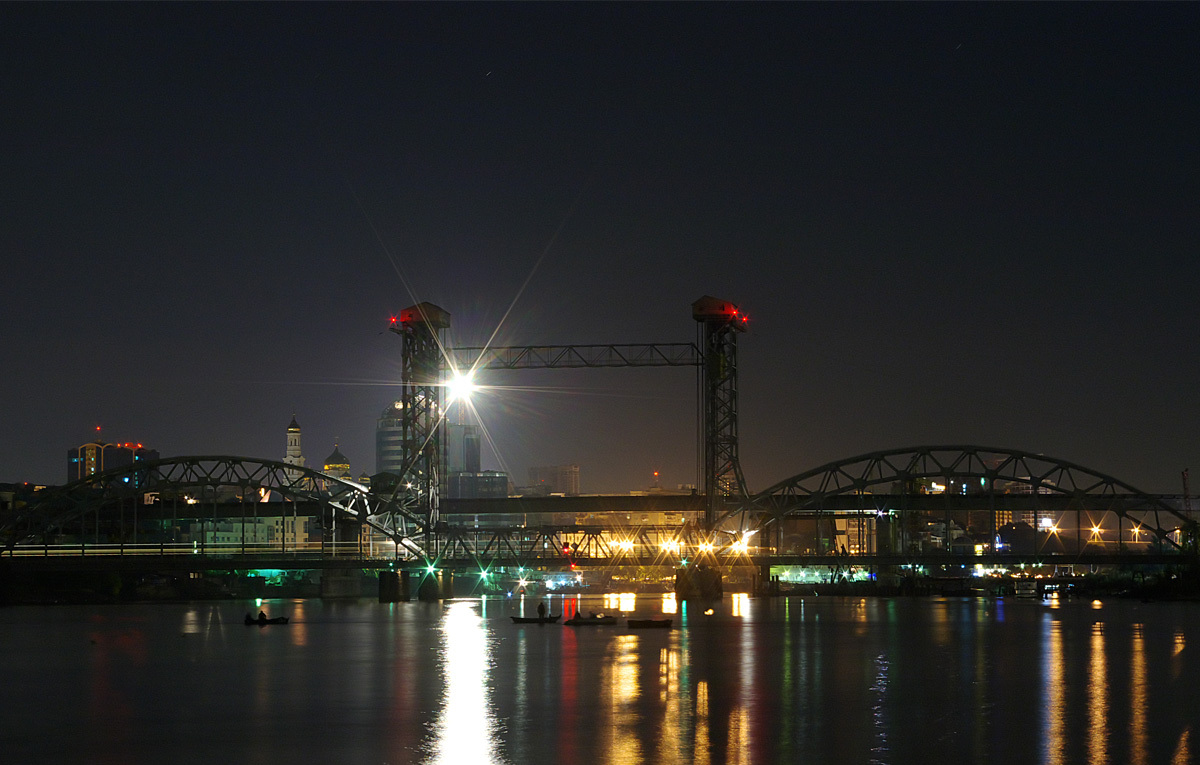
Railway bridge over the Don at night

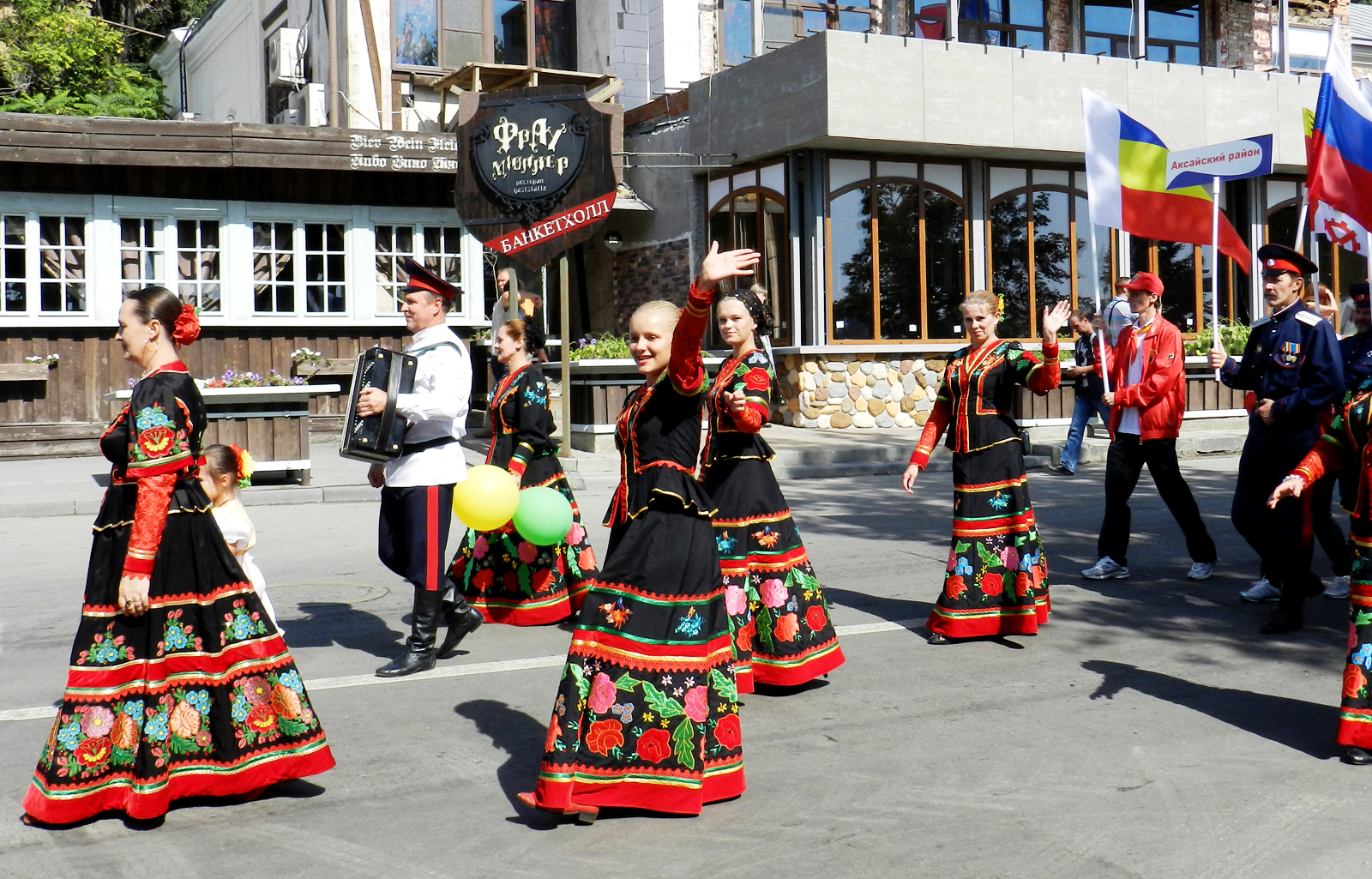
Cossacks of Rostov
