= Zmievskaya Balka =

Russian site of Holocaust massacre

Coordinates: 47.2456°N 39.6517°E

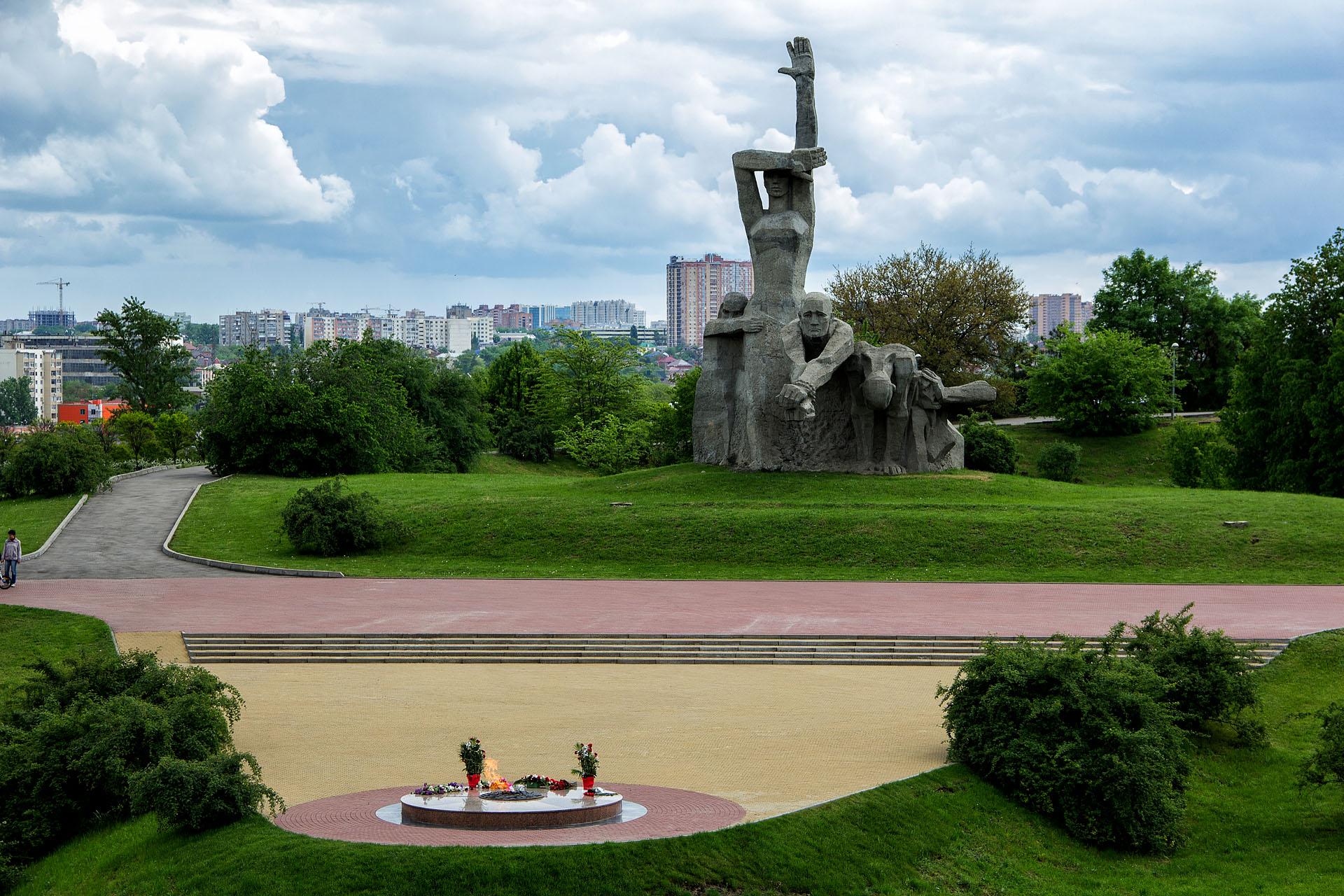
The Zmievskaya Balka Memorial Complex in 2016

Zmievskaya Balka (Russian: Змиёвская балка, IPA: [zmʲɪˈjɵfskəjə ˈbaɫkə]; "Ravine of the snakes") is a site in Rostov-on-Don, Russia at which 27,000 Jews and other Soviet civilians were massacred from 1942 to 1943 by the SS Einsatzgruppe D during the Holocaust in Russia. It is considered to be the largest single mass killing site of Jews in the Russian SFSR during the Second World War.

The Zmievskaya Balka Memorial monument was unveiled at the site on 9 May 1975.

== History ==
On 21 November 1941, Rostov-on-Don was occupied by the Wehrmacht four months into the German invasion of the Soviet Union, and the city was held for eight days until it was retaken by the Red Army. On 23 July 1942, the Wehrmacht recaptured the city and were accompanied by Einsatzkommando 10a, commanded by Heinrich Seetzen. The Einsatzkommando and Geheime Feldpolizei initially arrested some 700 people on the grounds that they were Soviet "partisans and party functionaries" and executed about 400 by 2 August 1942. Many Jews had fled from Rostov when the city was under the control of the Red Army, though about 2,000 remained and the Einsatzkommando began registering those over the age of 14 and requiring them to wear the yellow star.

On 11 August 1942, Jews in Rostov were ordered to gather at collecting points, under the guise of being resettled due to alleged violence from non-Jews that had occurred over the preceding days. Instead, the men were marched to Zmievskaya Balka, a ravine outside the city, where they were shot by the Einsatzkommando. The women, children and elderly were gassed in trucks, and their bodies buried in the same ravine.

After the initial massacres, the SS continued to bring thousands of Jews to be killed at Zmievskaya Balka until February 1943, by which time at least 15,000 Jews had been murdered in mass shootings.

=== Commemoration ===
On 9 May 1975, the city administration of Rostov-on-Don dedicated the Zmievskaya Balka Memorial at the site, commemorating the mass murders committed by German forces in the ravine. The monument has become the site of annual memorial ceremonies.

== Notable victims ==
- Sabina Spielrein, prominent early Soviet psychoanalyst
- Elena Shirman, Russian Soviet poet and journalist

== See also ==
- History of the Jews in Rostov-on-Don
