= History of the Jews in Rostov-on-Don =

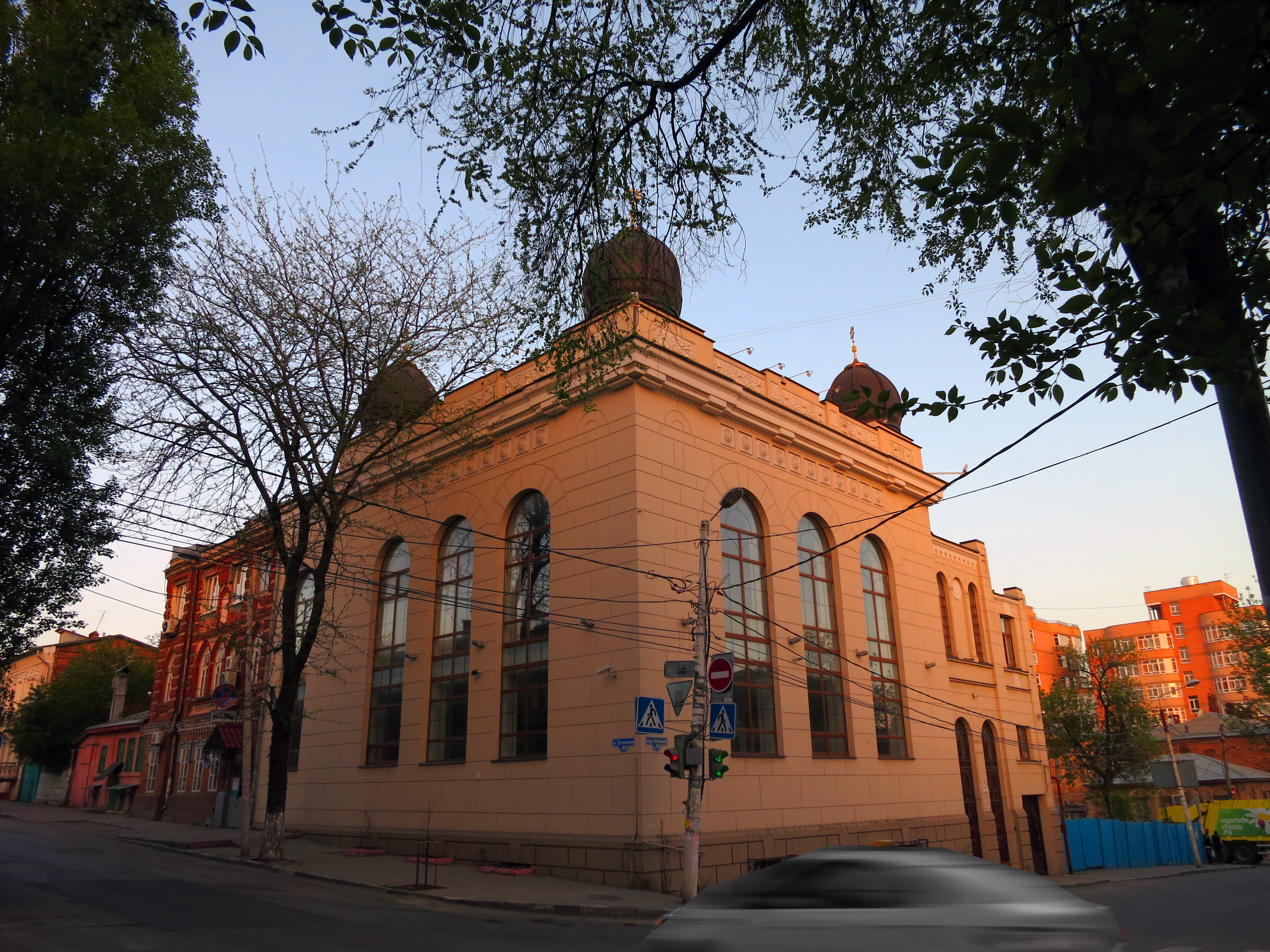
The Soldier Synagogue, the only active synagogue in Rostov-on-Don.

The history of the Jews in Rostov-on-Don dates to at least 1811. Rostov-on-Don was part of the Pale of Settlement until 1888, after which it was included in the military area of the Don Cossacks.

== History ==
The Rostov fortress and settlement were founded in 1761, and the town gained official status in 1796. The Jewish community remained small until the Poliakov brothers (Samuel, Lazar, and Yakov) built several railroads and transformed Rostov-on-Don into a major transportation center. By 1880, the Jewish population had increased to 5,000. The Jewish community continued to grow, reaching a height of 27,039 people in 1939. During the Holocaust, the Nazi Germans murdered 13,000 Jews at Zmievskaya Balka on 11 August 1942. Several days later, 2,000–5,000 Jews were shot to death in the local Jewish cemetery. During the Soviet era, the Jewish population steadily decreased between the 1950s and the 1990s, and by 2002 less than 5,000 remained in Roston-on-Don.

For many years, the Jewish community of Rostov-on-Don has sought to document and memorialize the city's Holocaust victims. An official monument in Rostov-on-Don does not mention Jewish people, only referring to "peaceful citizens of Rostov-on-Don and Soviet prisoners-of-war". An older plaque mentioning Jews was removed and placed at the Zmiyevskaya Balka memorial hall. The Russian Jewish Congress has pursued legal action to ensure that Jews are named in Holocaust memorialization. Russian authorities have opposed the efforts of the Jewish community.

In 2012, Rostov-on-Don had a Jewish community of around 10,000 people. The city government gave the Main Choral Synagogue a parcel of land adjacent to the synagogue so the community could build a Jewish community center. The city is also home to Chesed Sholom Ber, a Jewish social welfare organization, as well as to Ohr Avner Chabad, a Jewish elementary school.

== Notable Jews from Rostov-on-Don ==
- Lev Anninsky, a Soviet and Russian literary critic, historian, publicist, essayist and author.
- Yuri Bashmet, a Russian conductor, violinist, and violist.
- Yakov Frenkel, a Soviet physicist renowned for his works in the field of condensed matter physics.
- Elena Gnesina, a Soviet and Russian composer and music educator.
- Mikhail Gnessin, a Russian Jewish composer and teacher.
- Josefa Gurfinkel, a Jewish Russian-born Soviet chess player.
- Alexander Kaidanovsky, a Soviet and Russian actor and film director.
- Tsezar Kunikov, an officer in the Soviet Naval Infantry.
- Ray Lev, a Russian-born American classical pianist.
- Sophie Liebknecht, a Russian-born German socialist and feminist.
- Raïssa Maritain, a Russian-Jewish poet and philosopher who later converted to Catholicism.
- Alexander Schapiro, a Russian-born anarcho-syndicalist activist active in London and New York City.
- Leonid Shamkovich, a chess Grandmaster and chess writer.
- Elena Shirman, a Russian Jewish poet killed in the Second World War by the Nazis.
- Sabina Spielrein, a Russian physician and one of the first female psychoanalysts.
- Maxim Staviski, a Russian-born naturalized Bulgarian ice dancer.
- Mark Stolberg, a Russian chess master.
- Savielly Tartakower, a Polish and French chess player.
- Vera Weizmann, a medical doctor, Zionist activist, and first wife of Chaim Weizmann.
- Emmanuil Yevzerikhin, a Soviet photographer.

== See also ==
- History of the Jews in Russia
- History of the Jews in the Soviet Union
- Main Choral Synagogue (Rostov-on-Don)
- Soldier Synagogue, Rostov-on-Don
- Zmievskaya Balka
