= Nizhny Novgorod Synagogue =

Synagogue in Nizhny Novgorod, Russia

- The synagogue in 2013

- Location of the synagogue in the Nizhny Novgorod Oblast 56°19′13″N 43°59′40″E

Religion
- Affiliation: Judaism
- Rite: Nusach Ashkenaz
- Ecclesiastical or organizational status: Synagogue (1884–1938); Profane use (1938–1991); Synagogue (since 1991)
- Ownership: Jewish community of Nizhny Novgorod
- Status: Active

Location
- Location: 15 Gruzinskaia Street, Nizhny Novgorod, Nizhny Novgorod Oblast
- Country: Russia
- Interactive map of Nizhny Novgorod Synagogue

Architecture
- Architect: I. F. Neiman
- Type: Synagogue architecture
- Style: Eclecticism
- Groundbreaking: 1881
- Completed: 1884

Specifications
- Dome: One
- Materials: Brick

Website
- evreinn.ru

The Nizhny Novgorod Synagogue, also known as the Choral Synagogue in Nizhnii Novgorod, is a Jewish congregation and synagogue, located at 5 Gruzinskaia Street, in Nizhny Novgorod, in the Nizhny Novgorod Oblast of Russia. As of April 2018, the Jewish community of Nizhny Novgorod comprised more than 10,000 people. The synagogue was completed in 1884 in an eclectic style. The building was designed by architect Ivan Neiman.

In 1993 the synagogue was listed on the Russian cultural heritage register as a monument of regional significance.

== History ==
The Jewish population of the city grew rapidly during the 19th and early 20th centuries, rising from 300 people in 1850 to some 3000 people in 1913. The city accepted many Jewish refugees after World War I and Russian Civil War, swelling its number by some 15,000 people. The synagogue was built in the period from 1881 to 1883. The synagogue was led by a rabbi and a chief rabbi. There they formed a yeshiva and held charitable and funeral services.

Despite the increase of Jewish refugees in Nizhny Novgorod, government policy was aimed at reducing the Jewish population in the Nizhny Novgorod region. The policy of the Soviet regime towards Jews was dual. On the one hand, community institutions were abolished, and atheism was propagated. On the other hand, the government attempted to control accused anti-Semitism and fought against pogroms. For the most part, however, the propagation of atheism had the greater effect on Jewish church organisation, and as a result the synagogue's social role diminished along with the services it provided. By 1938 the synagogue, club and national society had been abolished.

With glasnost during the late 1980s and the subsequent fall of the Soviet government, the Jewish community of Nizhny Novgorod experienced a renaissance. A Club of Jewish Culture was established in 1989, and a religious community was registered. On 18 May 1991 the synagogue building was returned to the community, and services resumed later the same year. The synagogue is once again the centre of the city's Jewish community, and is involved in the organisation of a wide range of services, including schools and youth clubs, and social aid programmes such as a soup kitchen and drug and alcohol addiction prevention and support schemes. The synagogue is currently run by Rabbi Shimon Bergman.

== 21st century ==
In 2024 the installation of architectural and artistic lighting on the facade of the synagogue was completed. The project was developed and implemented by Avigrand LLC.

== Community ==
The revival of the Jewish Community of Nizhny Novgorod began in 1989, when several influential Jewish cities organized the Jewish Culture Club. Later, Lipa Gruzman registered religious communities officially and began taking action to return the synagogue buildings. September 1991 brought the opening of the Sunday Jewish School, and on April 17 the synagogue held an official opening ceremony after its renovation. In 1989 Edward M. Chaprak was appointed as head of the community. In 1999 Shimon Bergman came to Nizhny Novgorod to serve as the Chief Rabbi of the city. Under his leadership, the daily minyan was updated in the synagogue, and various Jewish institutions were opened in the city: the school Or Avner-Habad; the kindergarten, Gan Menachem; a youth club; and a summer camp with a boarding yeshiva, Torah lessons, and various activities for holidays. Two years later, the mikvah for women was built.

== See also ==
- History of the Jews in Russia
- List of synagogues in Russia
