= School No. 49 (Rostov-on-Don) =

- Школа № 49 (Ростов-на-Дону) (Russian)
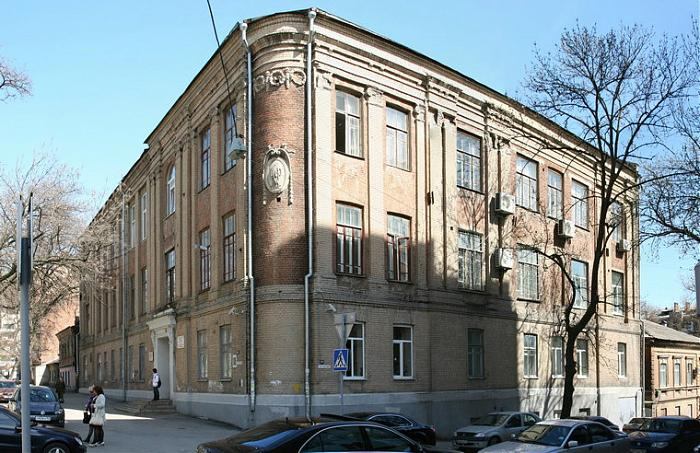

- Location within Russia
- Location: Gazetny Lane 82/108, Rostov-on-Don Russia

History
- Built: 1910

School № 49 (formerly the A.A. Filipieva Gymnasium) (Russian: Школа № 49 (бывшая гимназия А. А. Филипьевой) is a secondary school in Rostov-on-Don. The building was constructed in the 1910s based on a design by architect V. V. Popov Sr. in the Art Nouveau style. The school's building has been designated a cultural heritage site.

== History ==
The A.A. Filipieva Gymnasium was founded in the early 20th century. In the 1910s, it was moved to a new building on Gazetny Lane. After the establishment of the Soviet regime, the gymnasium was converted to a primary school and renamed School № 11. In the 1930s the school's name was changed to № 49.

== Architecture ==
The three-story school building has a P-shaped floor plan. Its asymmetrical facades face Maxim Gorky Street and Gazetny Lane. The facades are characterized by sculptural rounded angular volumes, and decorated with single and double Ionic pilasters that span the second and third floors. Modest stucco wreaths provide decoration. The monogram of Empress Maria Feodorovna appears on the semi-circular corner of the building overlooking the intersection. The high quality brick used in its construction produces a metallic sound when tapped. Some of the bricks have been glazed.

== Memorial plaques ==
In 2002, a memorial plaque was installed on the facade of the building that states: "The outstanding scientist, ophthalmologist, and statesman Svyatoslav Nikolayevich Fedorov graduated from this school in 1946." Fedorov's family paid for the installation of the plaque.

On October 4, 2012, another memorial plaque added that state: "Scientist and mathematician Yudovich Viktor Iosifovich, in whose honor a planet was named, studied at this school from 1946 to 1952."
