= Kisin House =

Building in Rostov-on-Don, Russia

Coordinates: 47°13′07″N 39°42′59″E

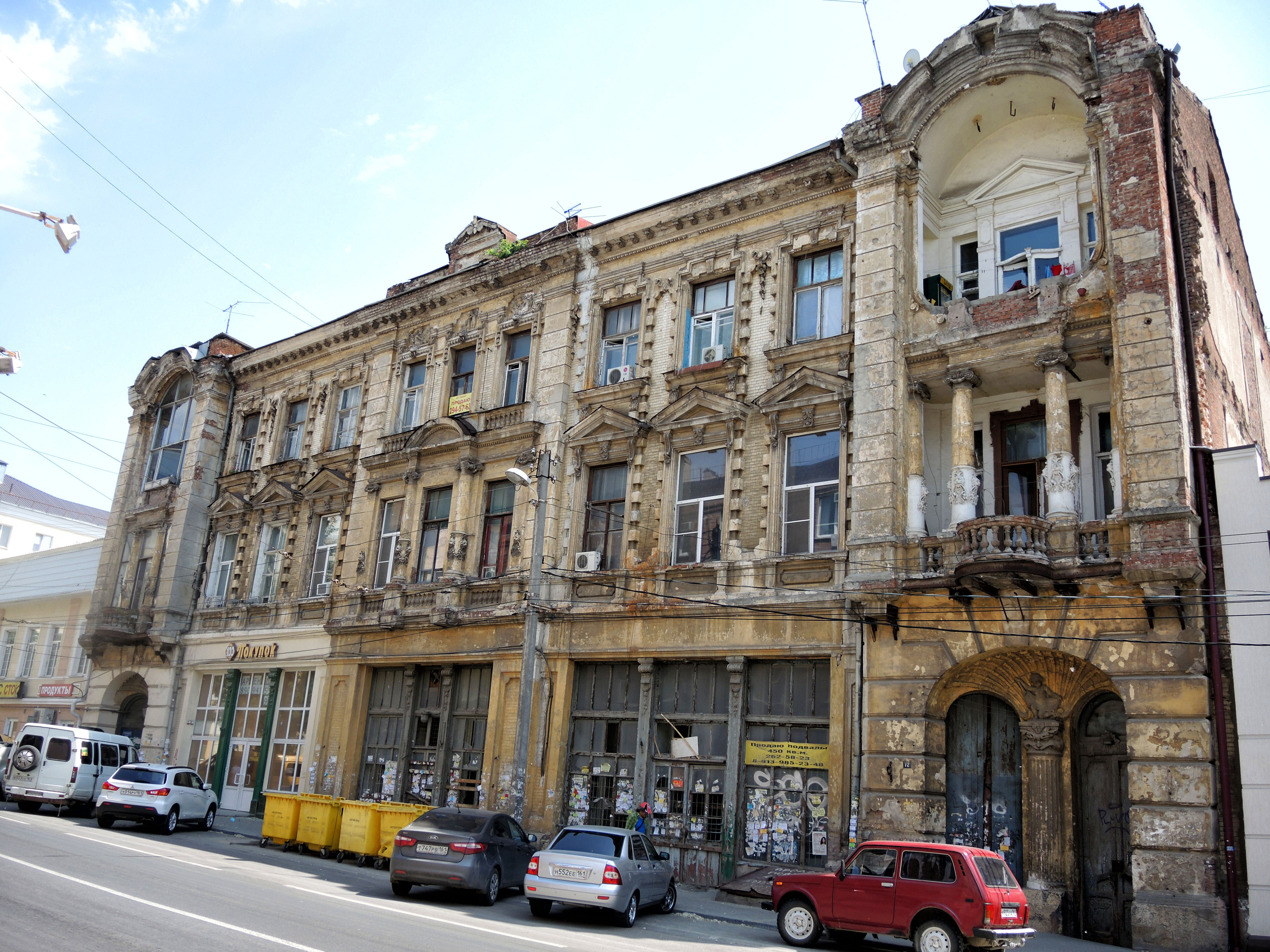
Kisin House

The Kisin House (Russian: Дом Кисина, romanized: Dom Kisina) is an edifice in the Leninsky District of Rostov-on-Don, Russia. The house is located at 72 Moskovskaya Street. The building has the status of an object of cultural heritage of regional significance.

== History ==
In the late 19th century the merchants Venyamin Grigorievich Kisin and Isaak Grigorievich Froimovich decided to build a new trading and revenue house, designed by the city architect Nikolai Doroshenko, and completed in 1899. The building was reconstructed to the design of city architect Nikolai Dubrakh between 1902 and 1910. The building was originally U-shaped; one side overlooked Gazetny Lane. This part of the building was destroyed by bombing in the Second World War.

Before the revolution of 1917, the ground floor was occupied by dress shops, while dwellings were on the upper floors.

After the revolution of 1917, the Anastas Mikoyan food market and the local address bureau were located on the ground floor; later, the address bureau occupied the whole floor, and remained there until 1990. This organization was mentioned in Ilf and Petrov's satirical novel The Twelve Chairs. The larger dwellings were subdivided with additional walls, increasing the number of rooms and residents. Street children slept at the house in the 1920s.

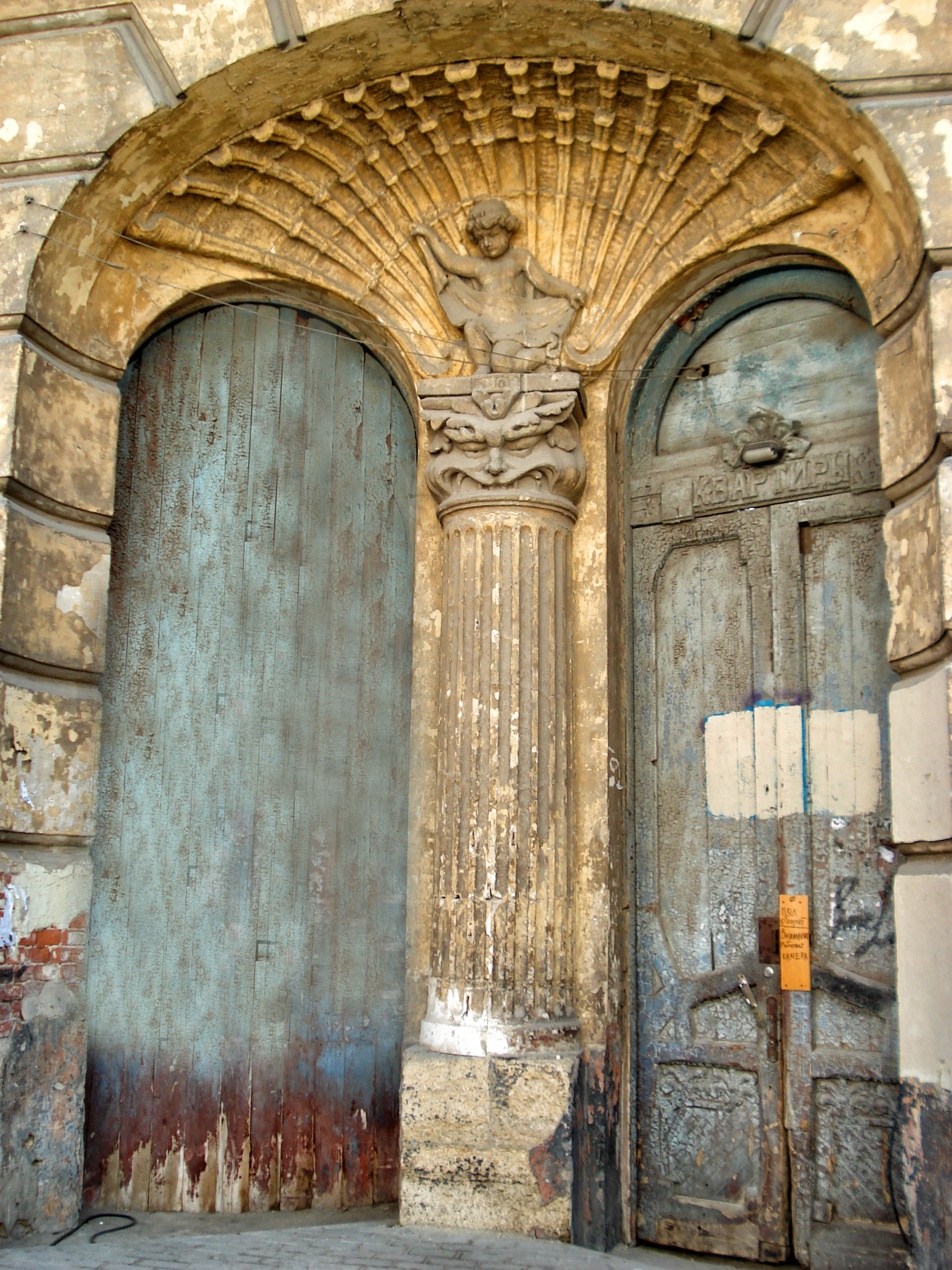
Decorative doorway details, in a state of disrepair in 2017

As of 2020, the building is in a dilapidated state. There are plans for the rehousing of residents and the construction of a museum.

== Description ==
The Kisin House was designed in the Beaux-Arts style. A symmetrical facade crowned with an arched attic is decorated in the Modern style with elements of сlassicism and irrationalism. The side projections are decorated with exedra. Windows on the second floor are crowned with triangular cornices. Overdoors are set over central windows. The cornice is crowned with parapets established between decorative pedestals. The building has four balconies with balustrades.
