= Gazetny Lane =

Street in Rostov-on-Don, Russia

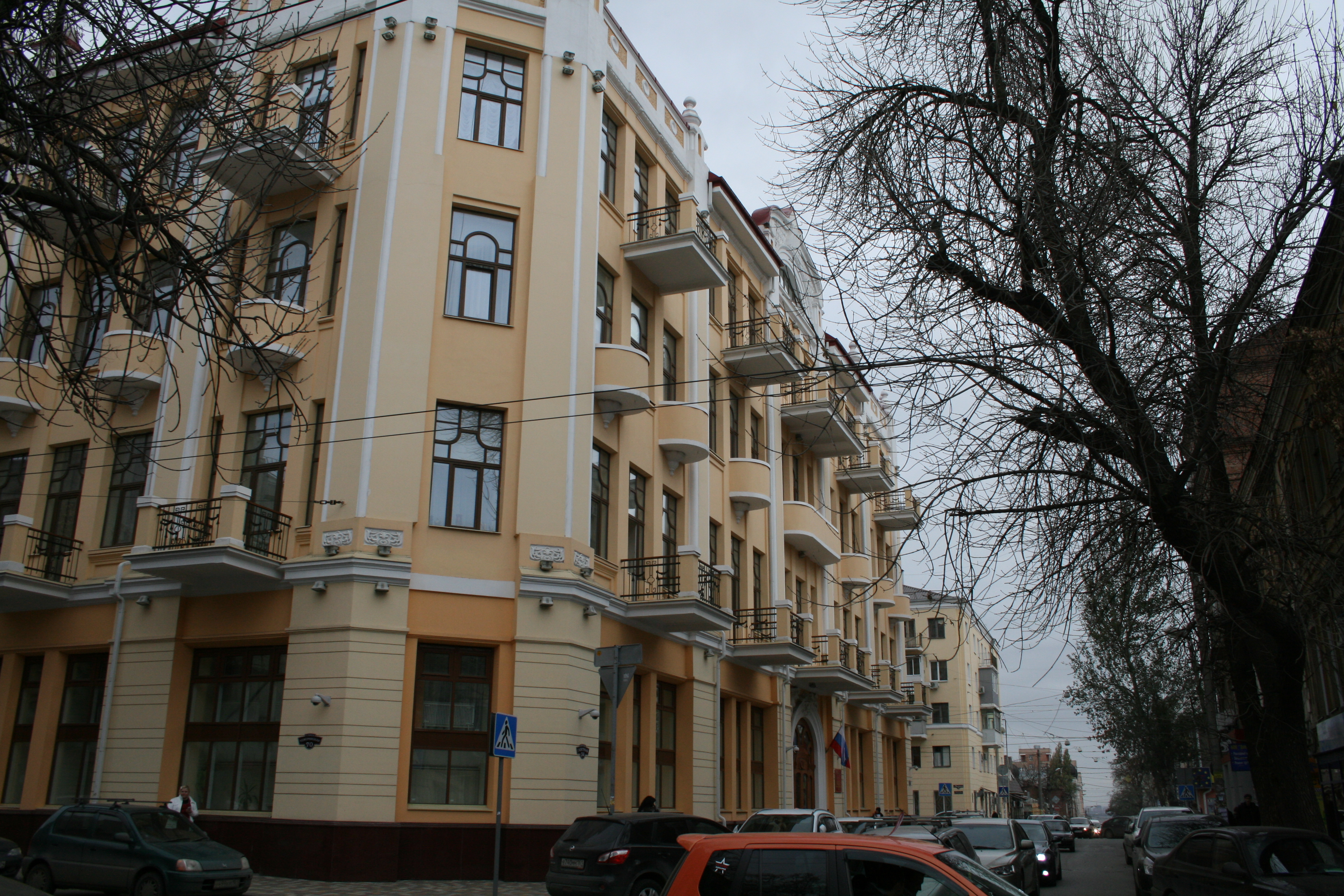
Gazetny Lane, with the Srabionov House on the corner

Gazetny Lane (Russian: Газетный переулок, tr. Gazetny Pereulok) is a lane directed from the south to the north in the center of Rostov-on-Don, Russia. It measures 2,1 km (1,3 miles) long, belongs to Oktyabrsky and Leninsky Districts and before the October Revolution was known as Kazansky Lane. During the NEP it became established as a red-light district.

== Places of interest ==
Starting from Beregovaya Street, Gazetny Lane almost at once introduces a cultural heritage site to a passer-by – the mansion of Pyotr Nikolayevich Wrangel, one of the main military leaders of the White Army during the Russian Civil War and the Commander-in-Chief of the Russian army in Crimea and Poland, who also participated in the Russo–Japanese War and the World War I. The house was built in 1885 upon the project of Nikolay Alexandrovich Doroshenko. The frontage is notable for lavish decoration and partly extant stucco work. Unfortunately, today the house of Wranghel remains in a neglected state. The dilapidated condition of the building was compounded by a barbarous act in the beginning of 2017.

The house number 9 at Gazetny Lane was place of living of Ryurik Rok, the leader of modernistic literary society of poets called poety-nichevoky (Russian: поэты-ничевоки). History of this rather little-known association originates in performances that took place in artistic café the Basement of Poets – a Bohemian place in small basement in the house number 46 at the same lane (Gazetny Lane and Bolshaya Sadovaya Street intersection) at the beginning of the XX century. Poety-nichevoky were one of the most scandalous modernistic literary societies in Russia.

The mentioned above café is distinguished by remarkable history, too. During the occupation of Rostov-on-Don by German forces in 1942-1943 it was transformed into a casino where the invaders used to spend their time. Then, by April 1945, this place had already become the first public toilet of the city. On 21 April Clementine Churchill deigned to pay it a visit and complimented citizens of Rostov-on-Don of keeping it clean (historical plaque at Bolshaya Sadovaya Street near Prospect of Chekhov reminds of this event). In March 2011 the toilet at Gazetny Lane was recognized the most famous toilet of the world by the website 1001 Wonders of the World (Russian: 1001 Чудо Света). Numerous exhibitions, actions and performances were held here. Among of the most important ones there was exhibition Provincial Avant-garde by the comradeship of artists from Taganrog and Rostov-on-Don called Art or Death (Russian: Искусство или Смерть, tr. Iskussto ili Smert), that also planned to reorganize the toilet into a permanent cultural center. There were several films, partly directed here. Also the toilet was attended by many famous persons, including Marcel Duchamp, Isaac Babel, etc. Today it is closed.

Besides these sites, on the Gazetny Lane one can find only active synagogue in Rostov-on-Don - Soldier Synagogue, the F. N. Solodov House, house of S.D. Srabionov (hotel Petrograd), some apartment houses, etc.
