= Volgograd Synagogue =

Historic synagogue in Volgograd, Volgograd Oblast, Russia

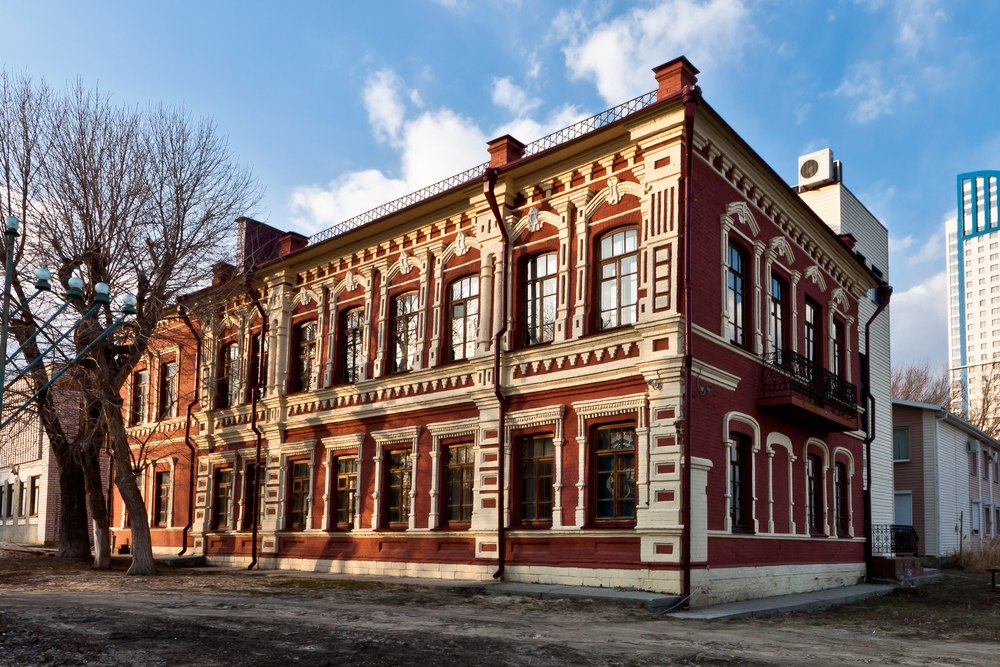
- The synagogue in 2012

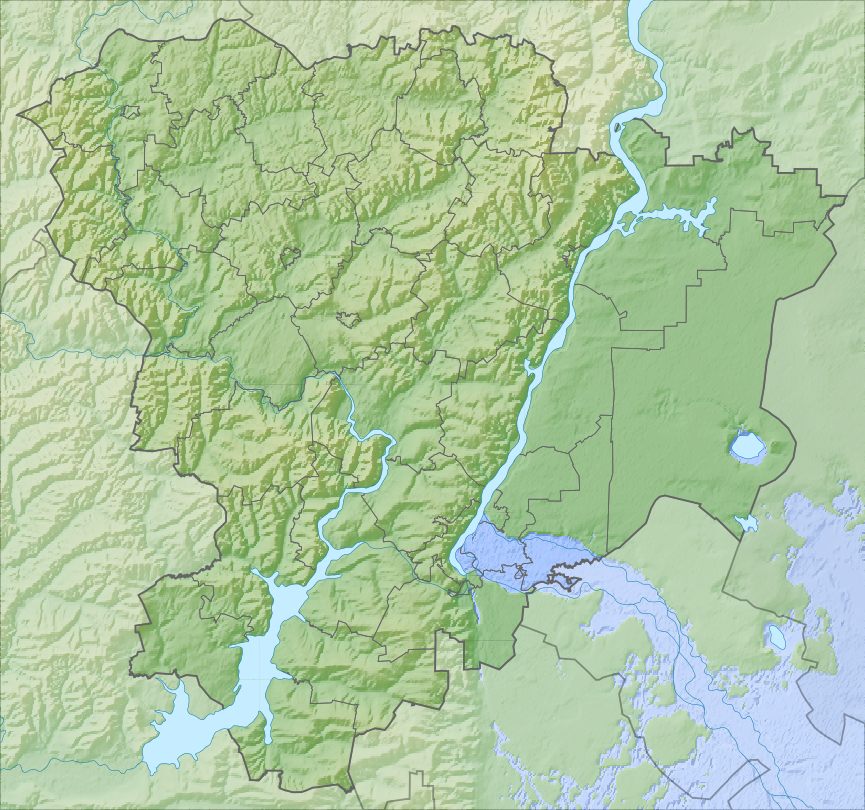
- Location of the synagogue in Volgograd Oblast

Religion
- Affiliation: Judaism
- Rite: Nusach Ashkenaz
- Ecclesiastical or organizational status: Synagogue (1888–1930); (then since 1999)
- Status: Active

Location
- Location: 2 Balahinskaia Street, Voroshilovskiy District, Volgograd, Volgograd Oblast
- Country: Russia
- Interactive map of Volgograd Synagogue
- Coordinates: 48°41′47″N 44°30′32″E

Architecture
- Type: Synagogue architecture
- Completed: 1888; 1999 restoration
- Materials: Brick

Website
- eaicy-dar.ru (in Russian)

The Volgograd Synagogue, also known as the Beit David Synagogue in Volgograd, is an historic Jewish congregation and synagogue, located at 2 Balahinskaia Street, in the Voroshilovskiy District of the city of Volgograd, Russia. Completed in 1888 in the city then called Tsaritsyn, the synagogue was destroyed during the Battle of Stalingrad after the invasion of German forces, and rebuilt after World War II.

On June 21, 2001 the synagogue was named after Beit David (House of David) in memory of the merits of David Ilyich Kolotilin (the former leader of a religious Jewish group that became the basis for the creation of the Volgograd Jewish religious community).

On November 20, 2007 the revived synagogue was opened after reconstruction. The ceremony was attended by the Chief Rabbi of Russia Berl Lazar.

== See also ==
- History of the Jews in Russia
- List of synagogues in Russia
