= Main Choral Synagogue (Rostov-on-Don) =

Former synagogue in Rostov-on-Don, Rostov Oblast, Russia

- Russian: Главная хоральная синагога
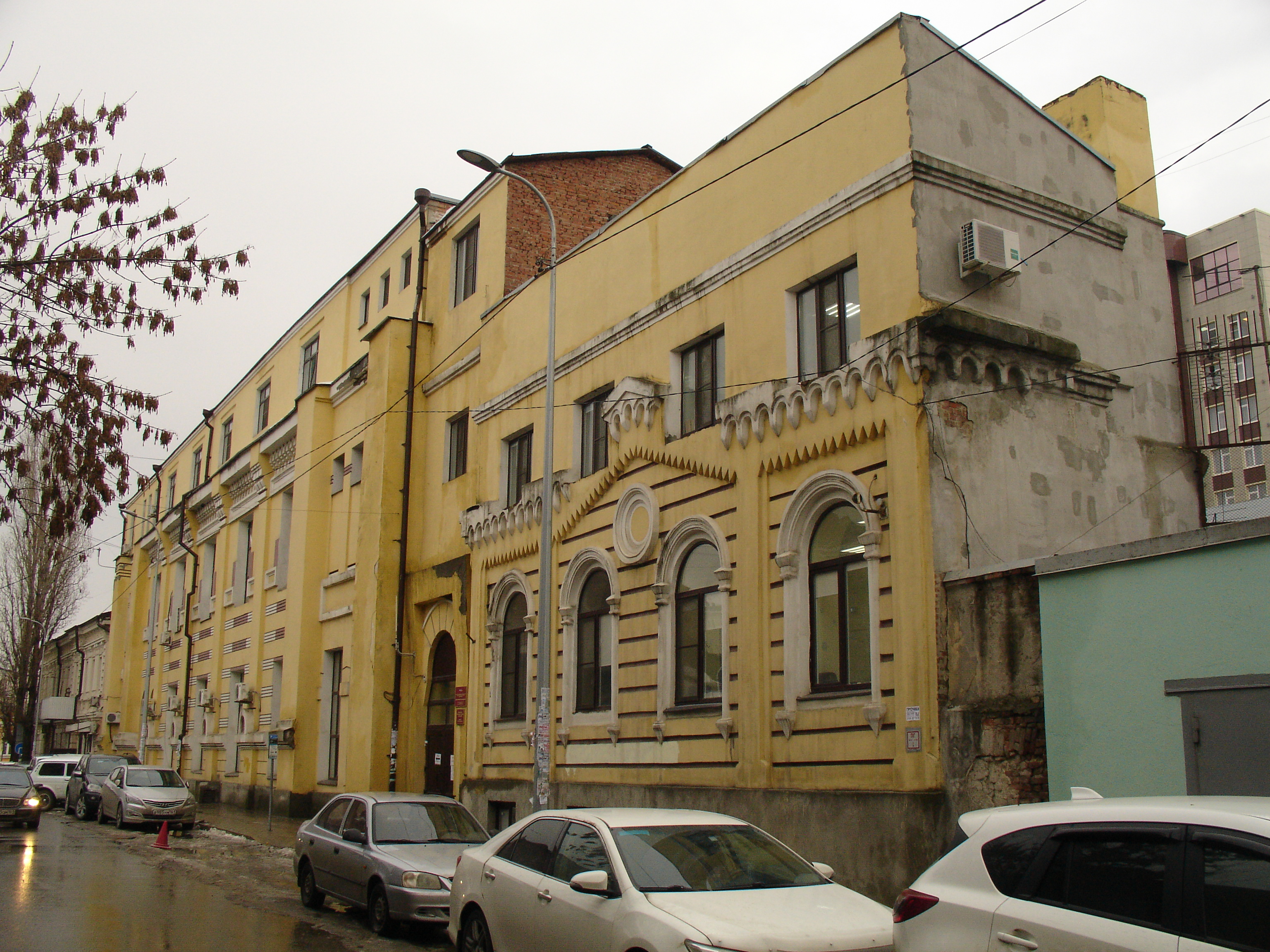
- The former synagogue in 2019

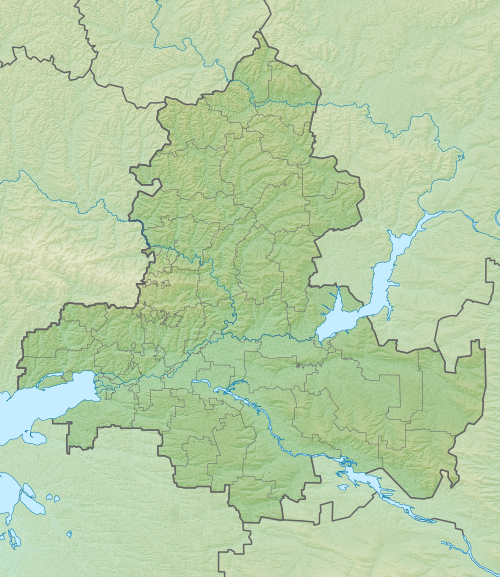
- Location of the former synagogue in the Rostov Oblast

Religion
- Affiliation: Orthodox Judaism (former)
- Rite: Nusach Ashkenaz
- Ecclesiastical or organizational status: Synagogue (1868–1935); Hospital (since 1935)
- Status: Inactive (as a synagogue); Repurposed

Location
- Location: 70 Baumana Street, Rostov-on-Don, Rostov Oblast
- Country: Russia
- Interactive map of Main Choral Synagogue
- Coordinates: 47°13′02″N 39°43′10″E

Architecture
- Type: Synagogue architecture
- Completed: 1868
- Materials: Brick

The Main Choral Synagogue (Russian: Главная хоральная синагога, romanized: Glavnaya khoral'naya sinagoga) is a former Orthodox Jewish congregation and synagogue, that is located at 70 Baumana Street, in Rostov-on-Don, in the Rostov Oblast of Russia. Completed in 1868, the building served as a synagogue until 1935; was nationalized and then rebuilt after the October Revolution; and currently operates as a hospital, for the Skin and Venereal Diseases Dispensary. The former synagogue building was listed on the Russian cultural heritage register in 1998.

== History ==
The first wooden synagogue in Rostov-on-Don was built in 1855. It was located between the present-day Bauman and Ulyanovsk streets near Voroshilov Avenue. In 1863 a brick house of worship was built, but the building was fragile, and in 1866 the house was demolished. In 1868, a new two-story synagogue was built in its place.

The authorship of the synagogue project is attributed to architect Sovitsky, collegiate assessor and senior city architect. A.G. Kaplun, S.I. Frey-schist, A.A Danziger also participated in construction works. Funds collection was organized by Rabbi F.I. Gnesin, who was the father of Mikhail Gnessin, a famous composer. At the end a sum of 16,342 rubles was collected.

Main Choral Synagogue was inaugurated on August 30, 1868. The ceremony was attended by Mayor A.M. Baikov. He noted in his speech that he aims "to equate Jews in terms of social position with the rest of the citizens of the city."

In 1881 there was built and attached to synagogue a house of worship, which could hold up to 150 people. A Jewish Library and Reading Room was opened in the synagogue in 1903. Moreover, it also housed a Talmud-Torah School. Thus, the Main Choral Synagogue became a religious and educational complex. The last rabbi of the synagogue before the 1917 Revolution was Z.M. Goldenberg.

In 1924 the synagogue was municipalized, but the building continued to be run by the Jewish community. In the summer of 1935 the synagogue was nationalized, and there was established a Dermatological and Venereal Hospital. The building was substantially rebuilt, and its architectural appearance was distorted. The interiors have undergone redevelopment, the prayer hall was demolished. The appearance of the synagogue façades was also seriously distorted: the old windows were enlarged, much of the stucco decorations were destroyed.

On Decree of the Head of Administration of the Rostov region № 411 of October 9, 1998, the former synagogue building was placed under state protection as an object of cultural heritage of regional significance. In 2016 the government of the Rostov region decided to return the former synagogue building to the Jewish community of Rostov.

== See also ==
- History of the Jews in Rostov-on-Don
- List of synagogues in Russia
