= Vladivostok Synagogue =

Historic synagogue in Vladivostok, Russia

- Russian: Синагога «Бейт Сима»
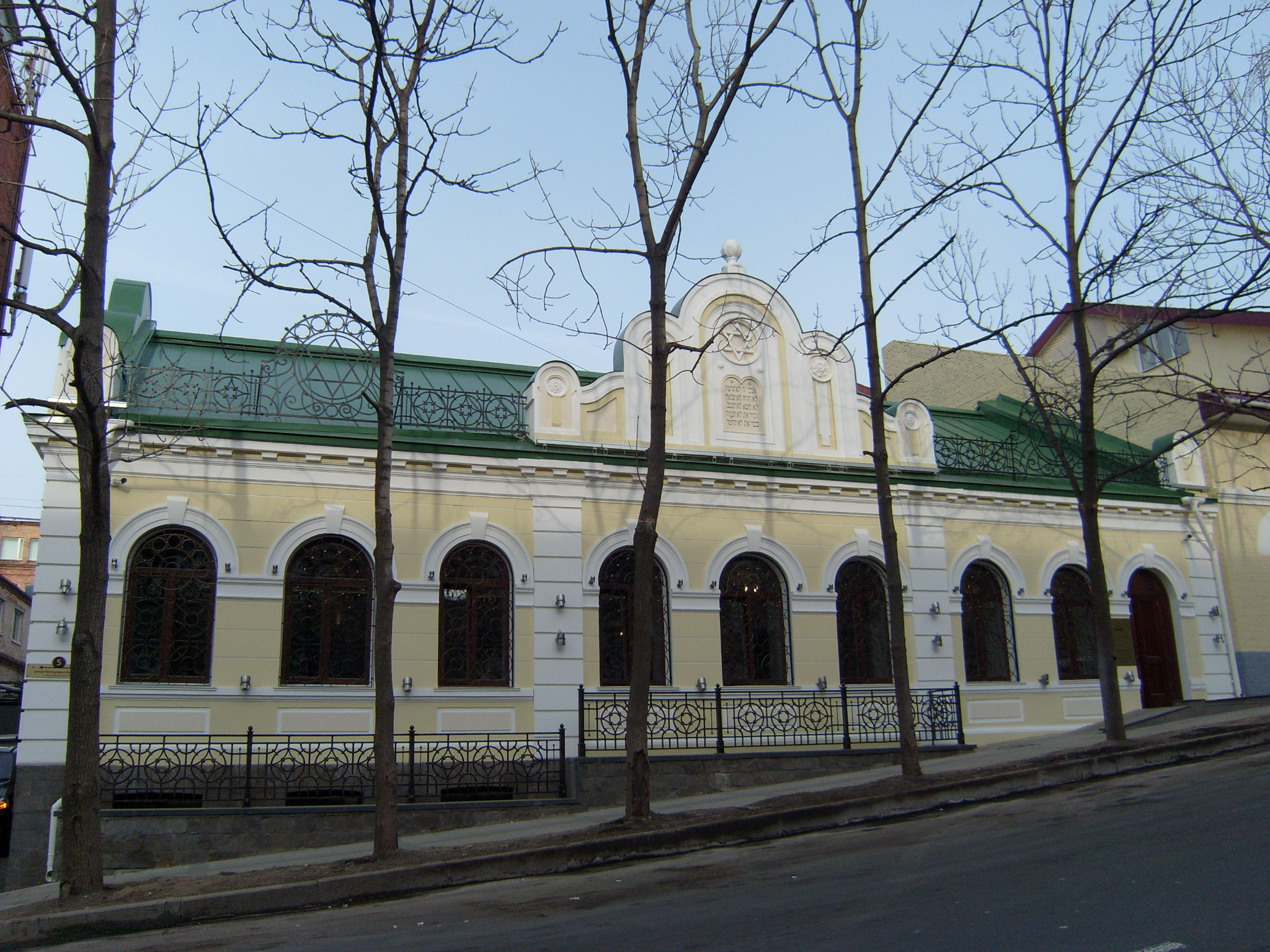
- The synagogue in 2015

- Location of the synagogue in Primorsky Krai

Religion
- Affiliation: Judaism
- Rite: Nusach Ashkenaz
- Ecclesiastical or organizational status: Synagogue (1917–1932); Profane use (1933–2004); Synagogue (since 2015)
- Status: Active

Location
- Location: 5 Praporshchika Komarova Street, Vladivostok, Primorsky Krai
- Country: Russia
- Interactive map of Vladivostok Synagogue
- Coordinates: 43°07′22″N 131°53′09″E

Architecture
- Type: Synagogue architecture
- Groundbreaking: 1914
- Completed: 1917; 2015 restoration
- Materials: Brick

The Vladivostok Synagogue, also known as the Bet Sima Synagogue (Russian: Синагога «Бейт Сима»; Hebrew: בית סימה), is an historic Jewish congregation and synagogue, located at 5 Praporshchika Komarova Street, in the historic district of the city of Vladivostok, Russia. It is the only synagogue in Primorsky Krai and the oldest continuously operating synagogue in the Russian Far East.

For 70 years, the synagogue building was property of the Soviet authorities. The building was returned to the Jewish community and restored in 2005 and was rededicated as "Bet Sima".

== History ==
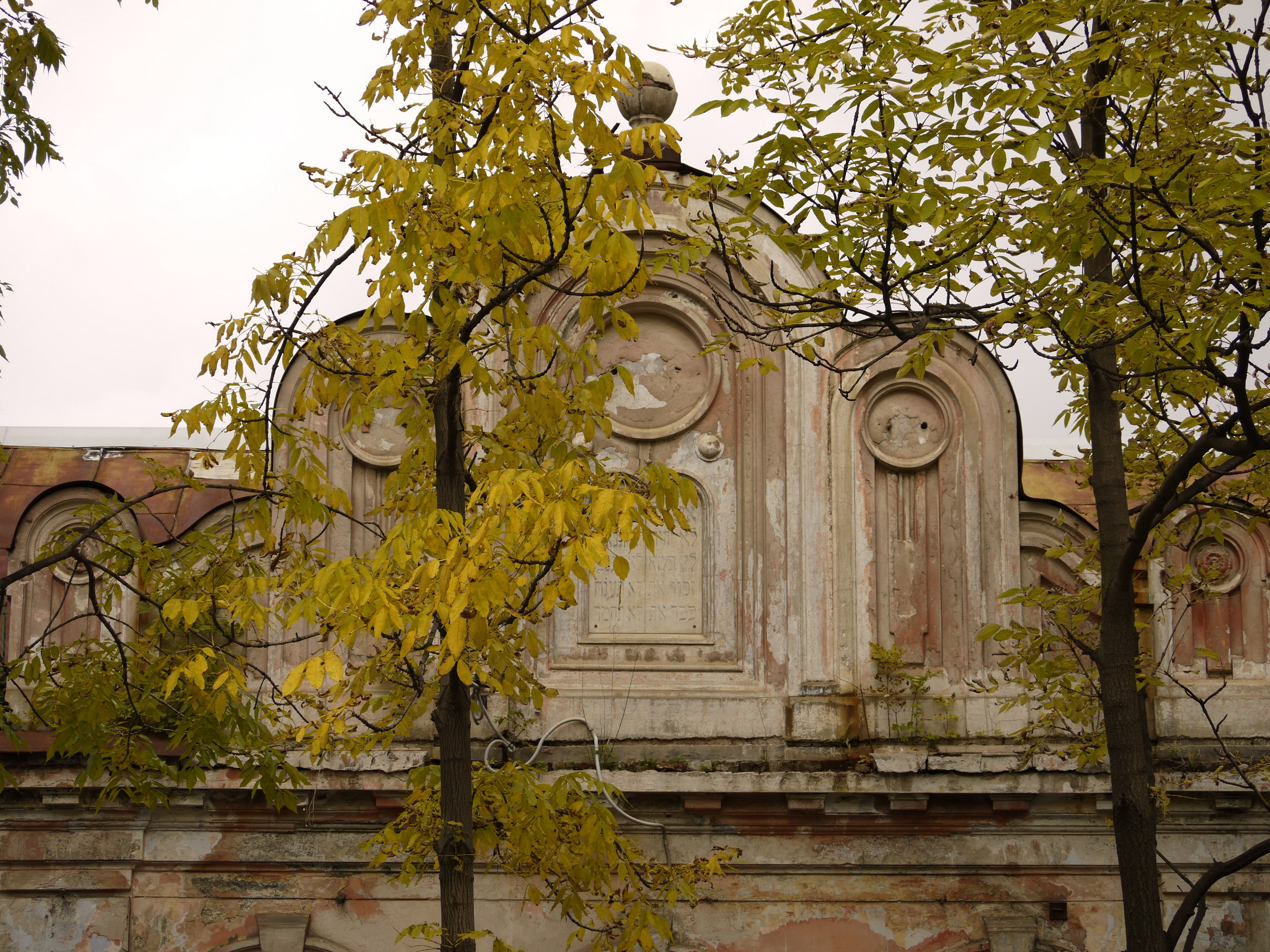
Part of the façade in 2005, prior to its restoration

Until the 1917 February Revolution, Russian Jews had the ability (outside of the Pale of Settlement) to rent a building for use as a synagogue, without the right to own it. In 1911, the Jewish community of Vladivostok was about 160 men, and had a synagogue located at 19 Komarovska Street (today 5 Praporchik Komarov Street).

It was Léonti (Leïb) Semïonovitch (Chimanovitch) Skidelski (1845—1916) who built what is now Bet Sima Synagogue. He was a trader with the first guild, an honorary citizen of Vladivostok, sponsor of the Society of Study of the Amur Region and a patron of industry in Ussuri krai.

On October 5, 1916, three days before his death, Skidelski laid the first stone for the "Synagogue of the Jewish Community of Vladivostok" (the name used at the time) near the previous location of the community. The construction was funded by private donations. At the time, Jews often had to ask permission to build a private building and then ask permission to use it as a house of prayer. By 1917, Judaism was legalized in Russia and the existing synagogue was allowed to operate as a place of worship, owned by the Jewish community.

At the end of 1932 the synagogue was closed by Soviet authorities, and the Jewish community was dissolved by law. The synagogue building was given to Vladivostok Confectionary Factory in 1933, first as a club and later as the store for the factory. The factory had the building until the early 1990s.

In 1996, the building was listed on the Russian cultural heritage register as an architectural monument of regional value.

=== Restoration ===
On September 8, 2004 Sergei Darkine, Governor of Primorsky Krai, presented Chief Rabbi Berel Lazar with the legal documents giving the rights to use the building for free in perpetuity. The Federation of Jewish Communities of Russia later transferred that right to the local Jewish community in 2005. In February 2013 Shimon Varakin, Rabbi of Primorsky Krai and Vladivostok announced plans to renovate the synagogue based on new plans. The Jewish community in Vladivostok, which numbered about 300 at the time, received support from a businessman in Moscow for the project.

In autumn 2013, the renovations began, finishing in June 2014.

The re-dedication of the synagogue took place on December 18, 2015. The synagogue was renamed "Bet Sima" in honor of the mother of banker Vladimir Kogan, Serafima (Sima) Kogan.

== See also ==
- History of the Jews in Russia
- List of synagogues in Russia
