= Srabionov's house =

- Дом Срабионова
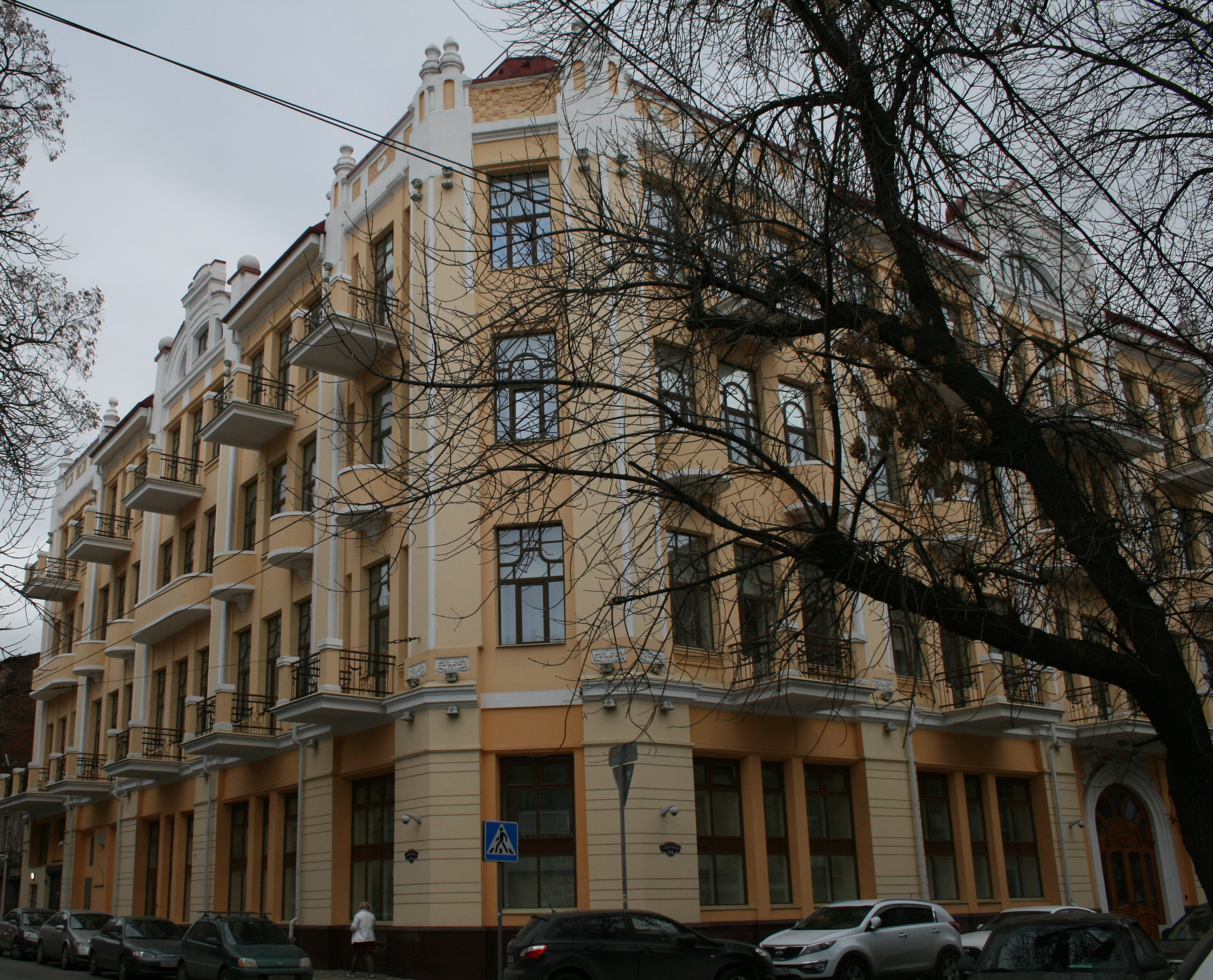
- 47.2195°N 39.7170°E
- Location: Rostov-on-Don, Gazetny Lane, 34/70
- Designer: A. H. Zakiyev (architect)

Srabionov's house (Russian: Дом Срабионова) is a building in Rostov-on-Don built in the 1910s on the project of the architect A. H. Zakiyev. Initially the house belonged to S.D. Srabionov, in him the Petrograd hotel was placed. As of 1925 it was DOMHA hotel "Business yard". From 1940th years the hotel carried the name "Don". Now the building occupies the Fifteenth arbitration Court of Appeal. In 2009–2013 in the building capital repairs were made. Srabionov's house has the status of an object of cultural heritage of regional value.

== Architecture ==
Srabionov's house is located at the intersection of Temernitskaya Street and Gazetny Lane. The facades taking to the streets have symmetric composition.

Srabionov's house
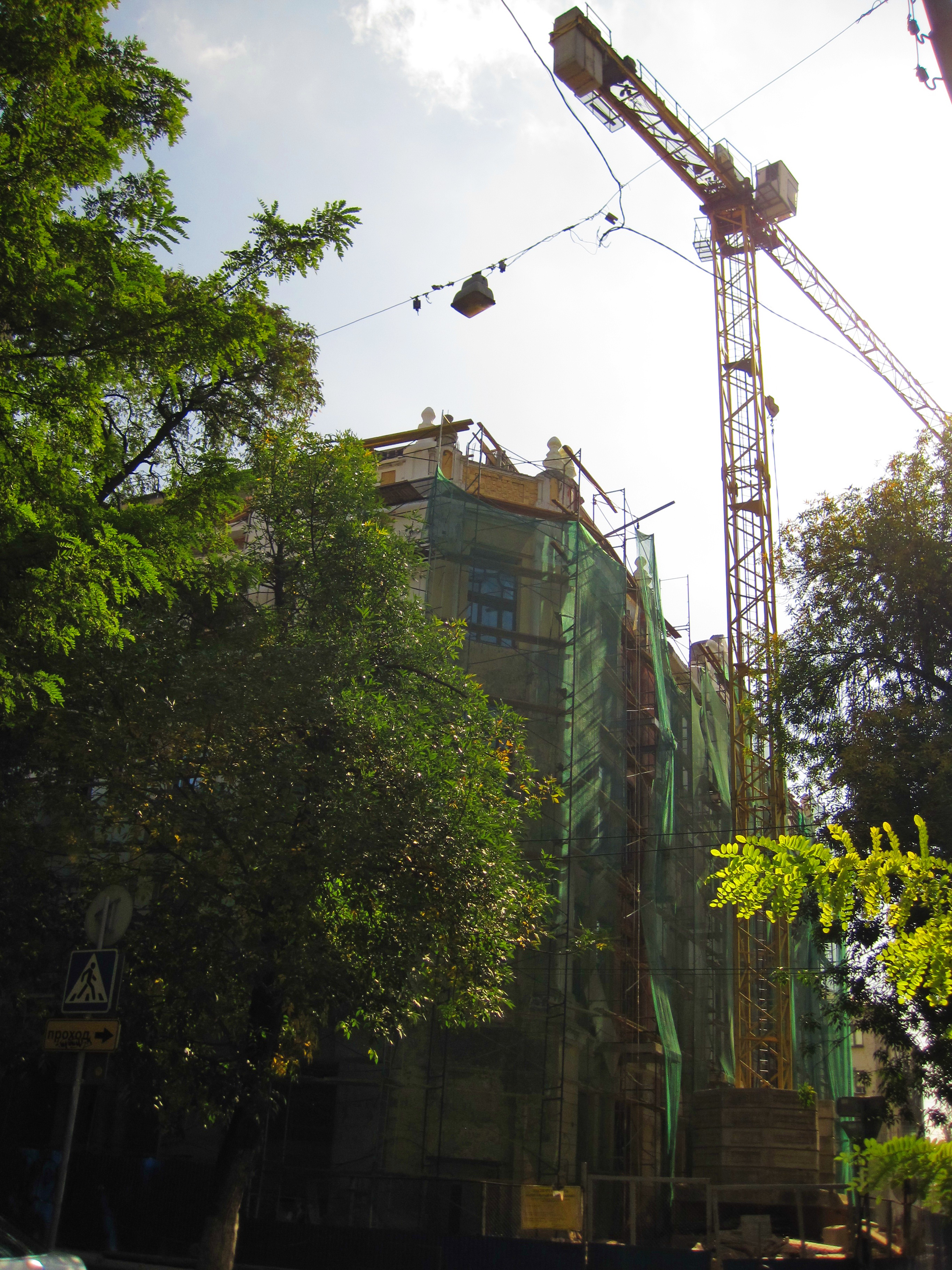
Building repair

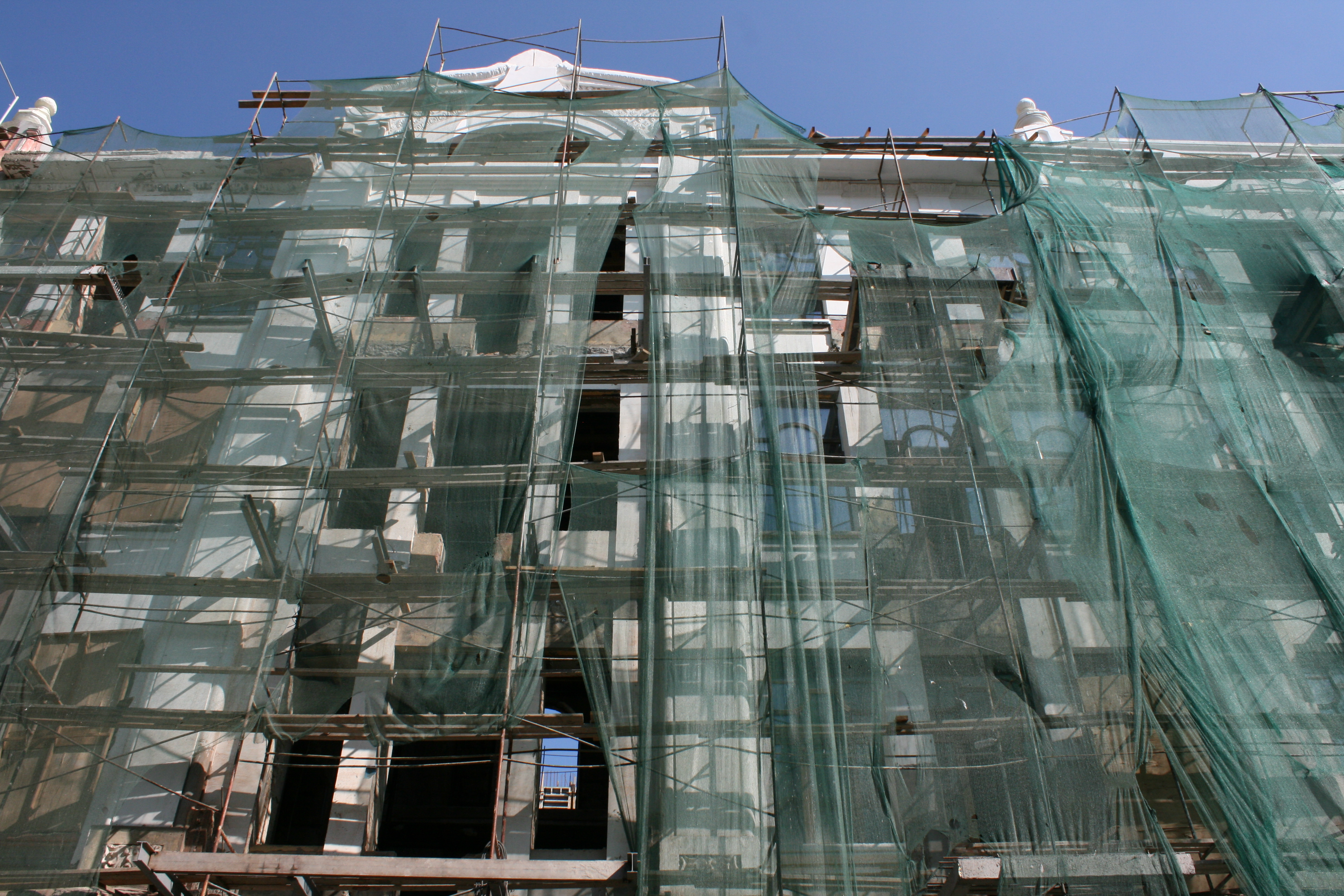
Facade

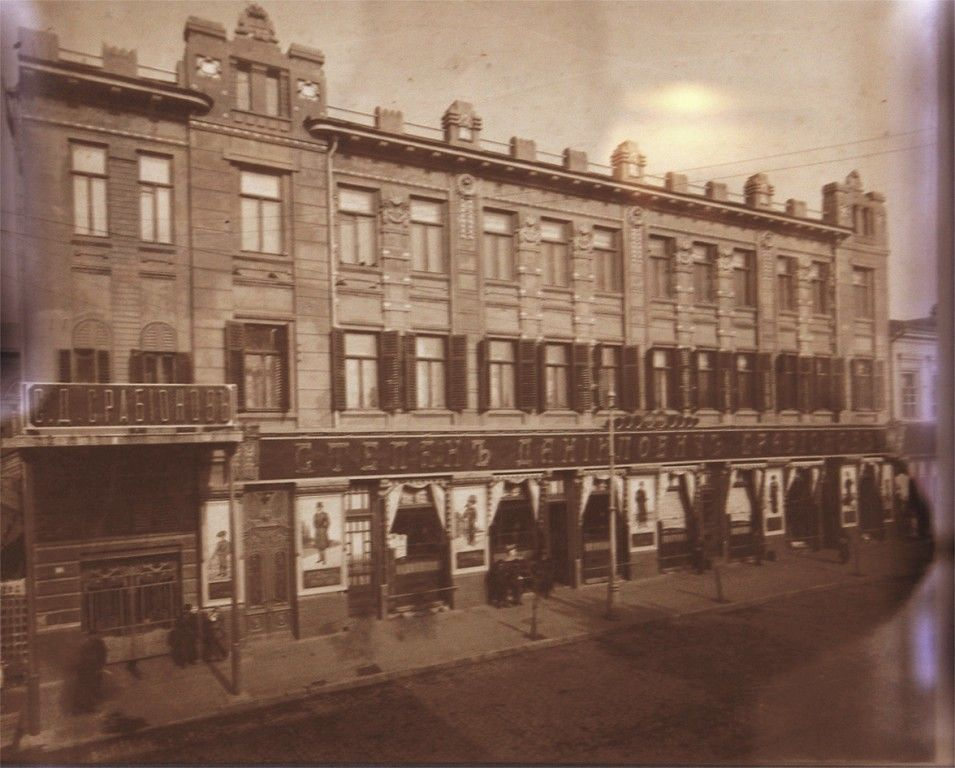
Srabionov's house, 1910-1917

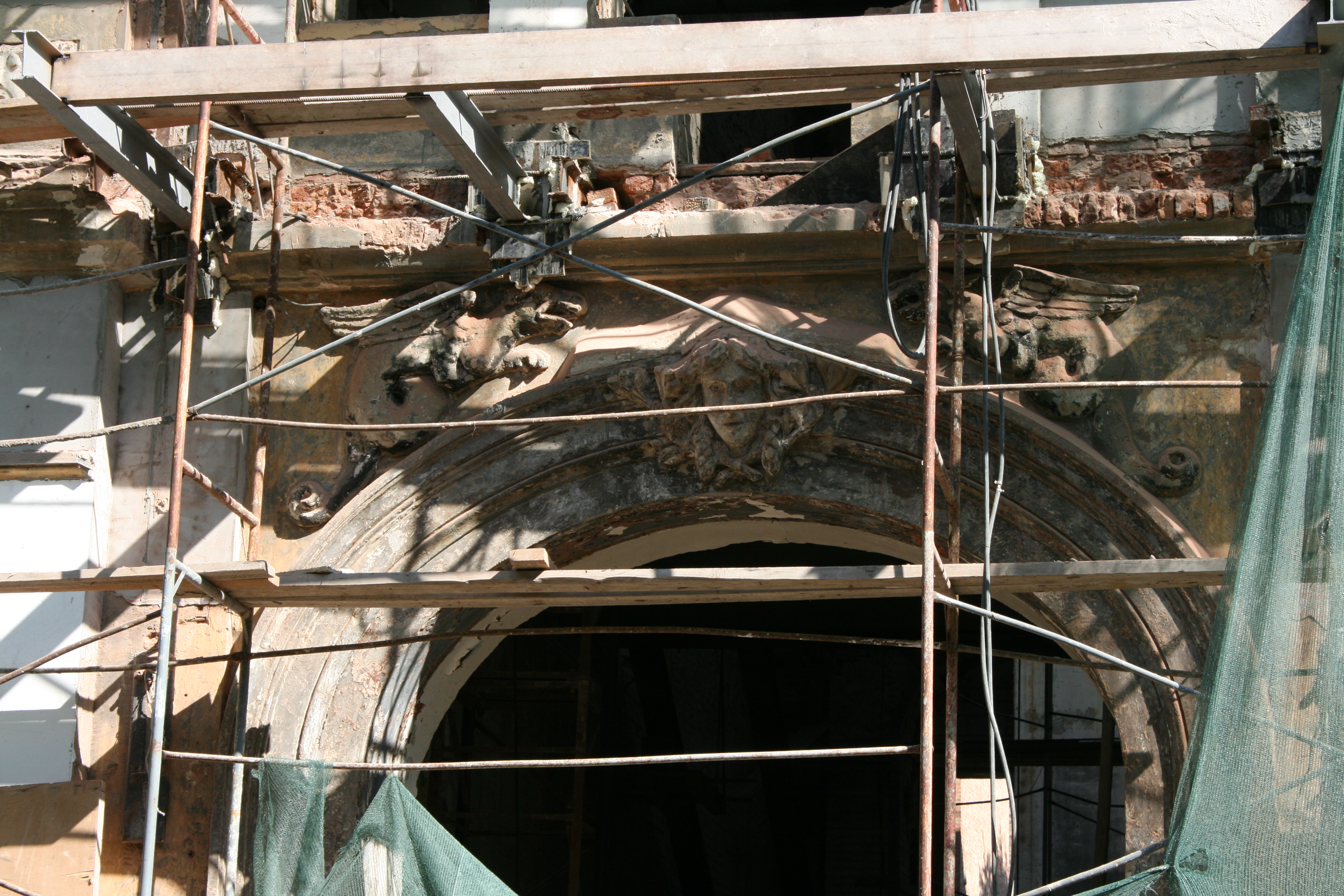
Arch of the main entrance
