= F. N. Solodov House =

Place

House of F. N. Solodov
- Дом Ф. Н. Солодова
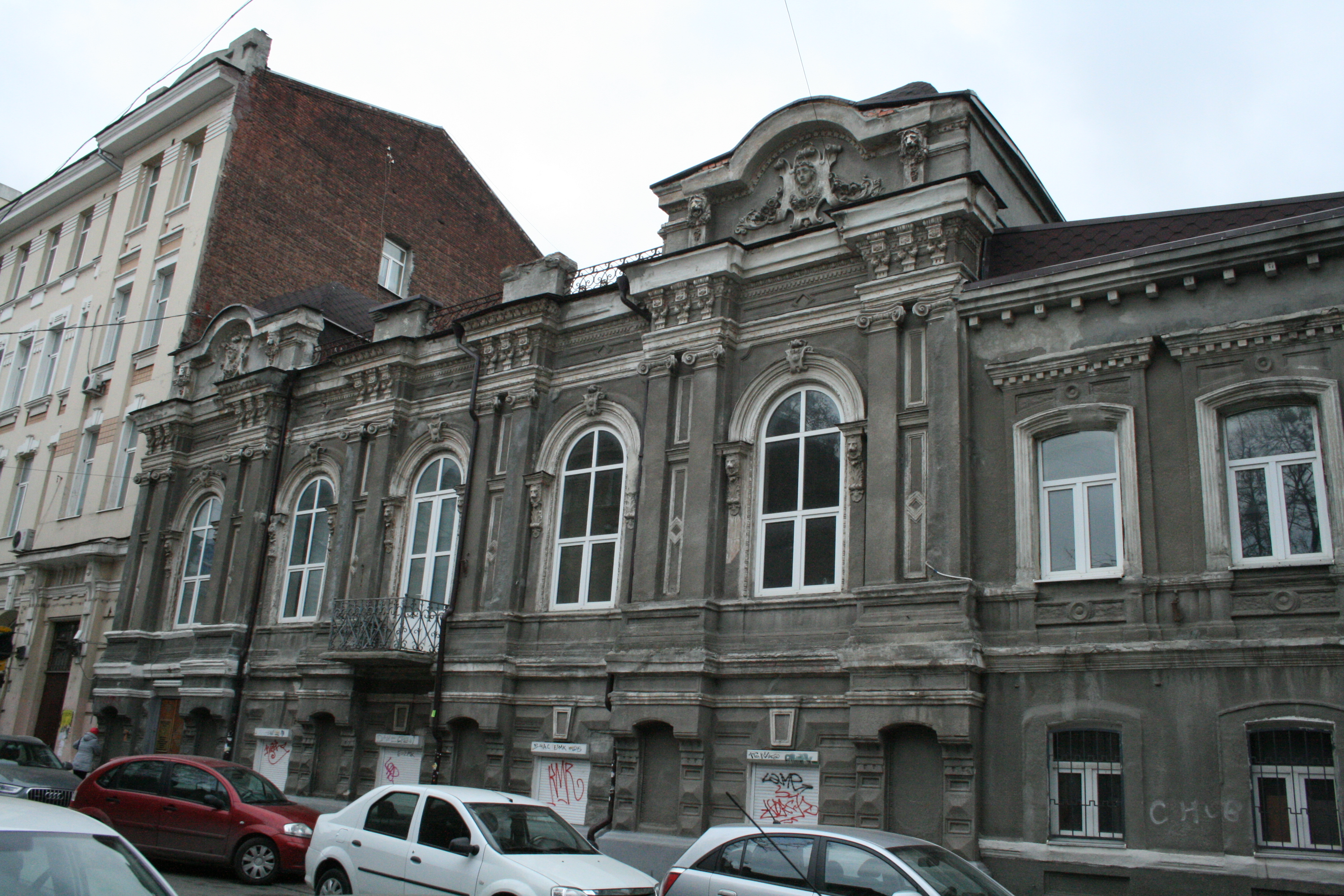
- Location: 47 Gazetny Lane, Rostov-on-Don
- Coordinates: 47°13′22″N 39°42′54″E

The F. N. Solodov House (Russian: Дом Ф. Н. Солодова) is a historic building in Rostov-on-Don, Russia. The building has the status of an object of cultural heritage of regional significance.

== History ==
The house was built in the 19th century. In the 1880s, it was expanded with the addition of a two-story wing, according to plans developed by architect Nikolai Doroshenko. The owner of the house ran a flour mill, with the building adjoining the Solodov factory complex. Documents from the early 20th century list the house as the property of Nikolai Solodov's wife, Ekaterina Nikolaevna Solodova. For a time the "House of Education Workers", also known as the "Teacher's Club," was located inside the building. It included a large library, used by teachers and students.

The building is designed in the eclectic style. Window openings were decorated with rectangular forms, and the window niches with rosettes. The two-storey house is rectangular in plan, with a cellar in the central part of the house. There is an attic, which is completed by two four-sided tent roofs. The facade is plastered, with semi-circular window openings decorated by simple platbands. The parapets were encased in openwork metal protection. The stucco décor includes mascarons decorating capstones and brackets, as well as the attic. The roof has been altered several times during repair work, resulting in the creation of an overlapping roof. The grilles on the first-floor windows, as well as the original filling of the window and door openings, have been lost.
