= List of synagogues in Russia =

This is a list of notable synagogues in Russia.

== Moscow ==
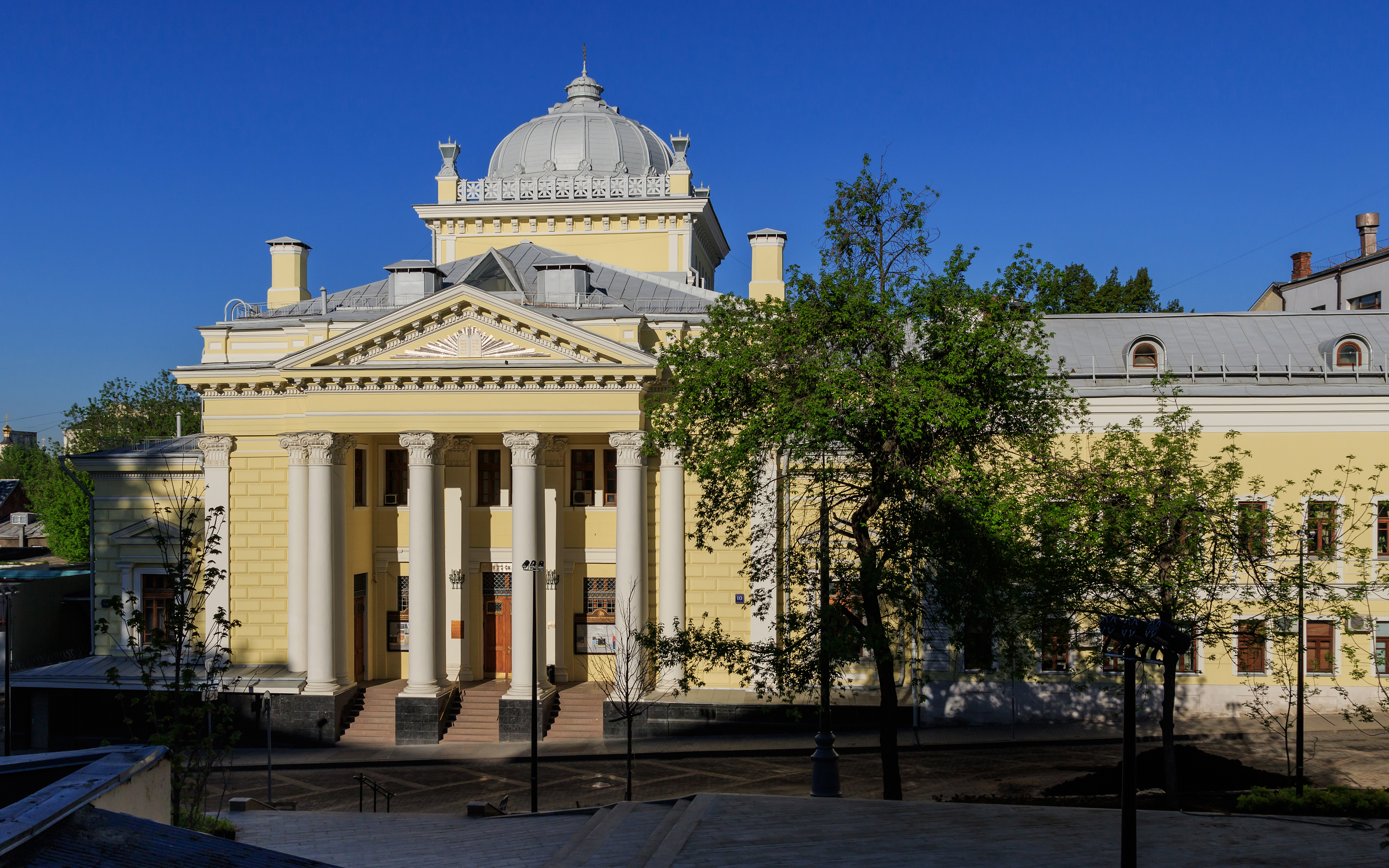
Moscow Choral Synagogue in Moscow

- Bolshaya Bronnaya Synagogue
- Holocaust Memorial Synagogue (Moscow)
- Maryina Roshcha Synagogue (Moscow)
- Moscow Choral Synagogue

== Saint Petersburg ==
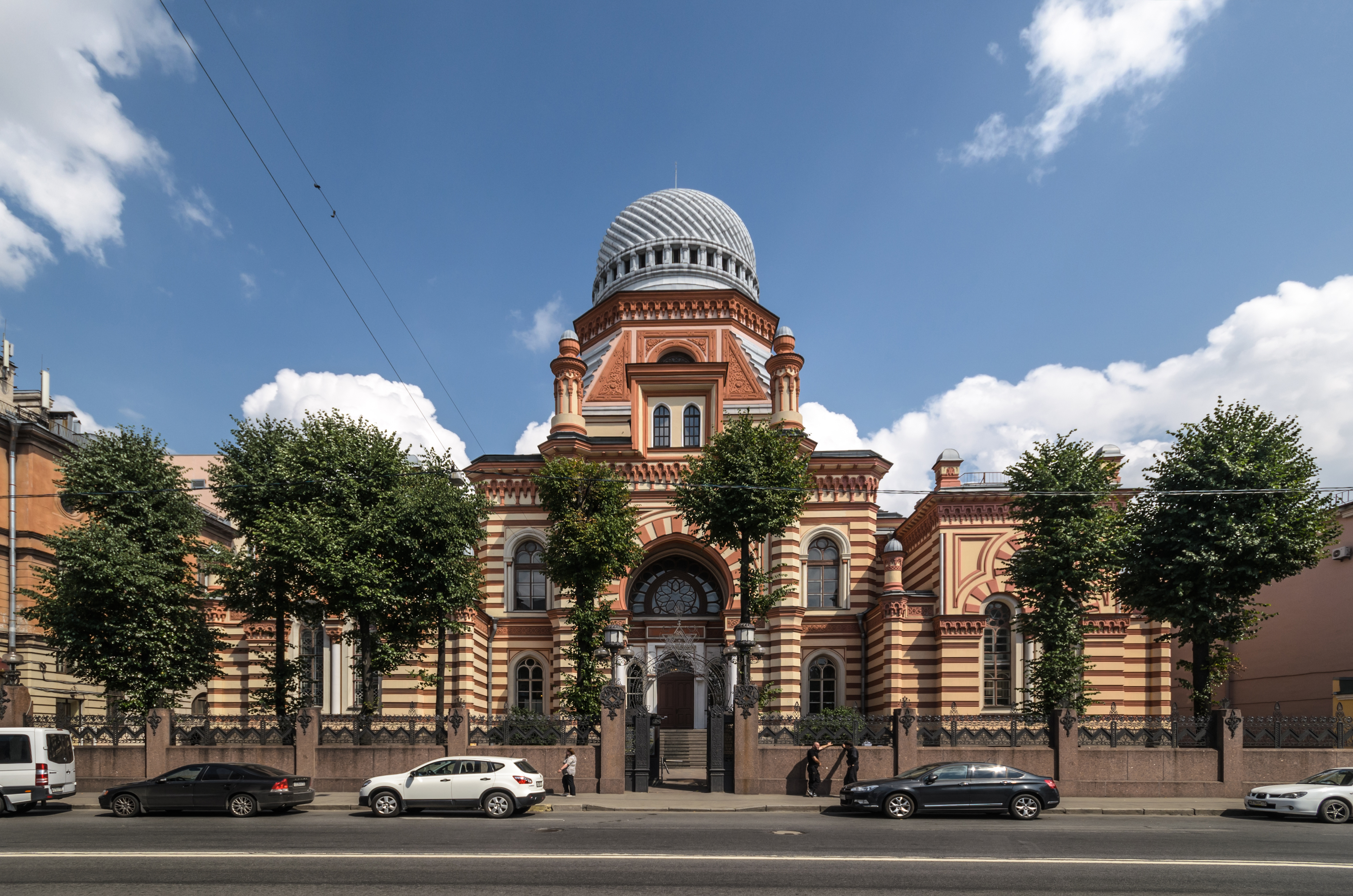
Grand Choral Synagogue in Saint Petersburg

- Grand Choral Synagogue

== Jewish Autonomous Oblast ==
- Beit T'shuva, Birobidzhan, Jewish Autonomous Oblast
- Birobidzhan Synagogue, Birobidzhan, Jewish Autonomous Oblast

== Irkutsk Oblast ==
- Irkutsk Synagogue

== Kaliningrad Oblast ==
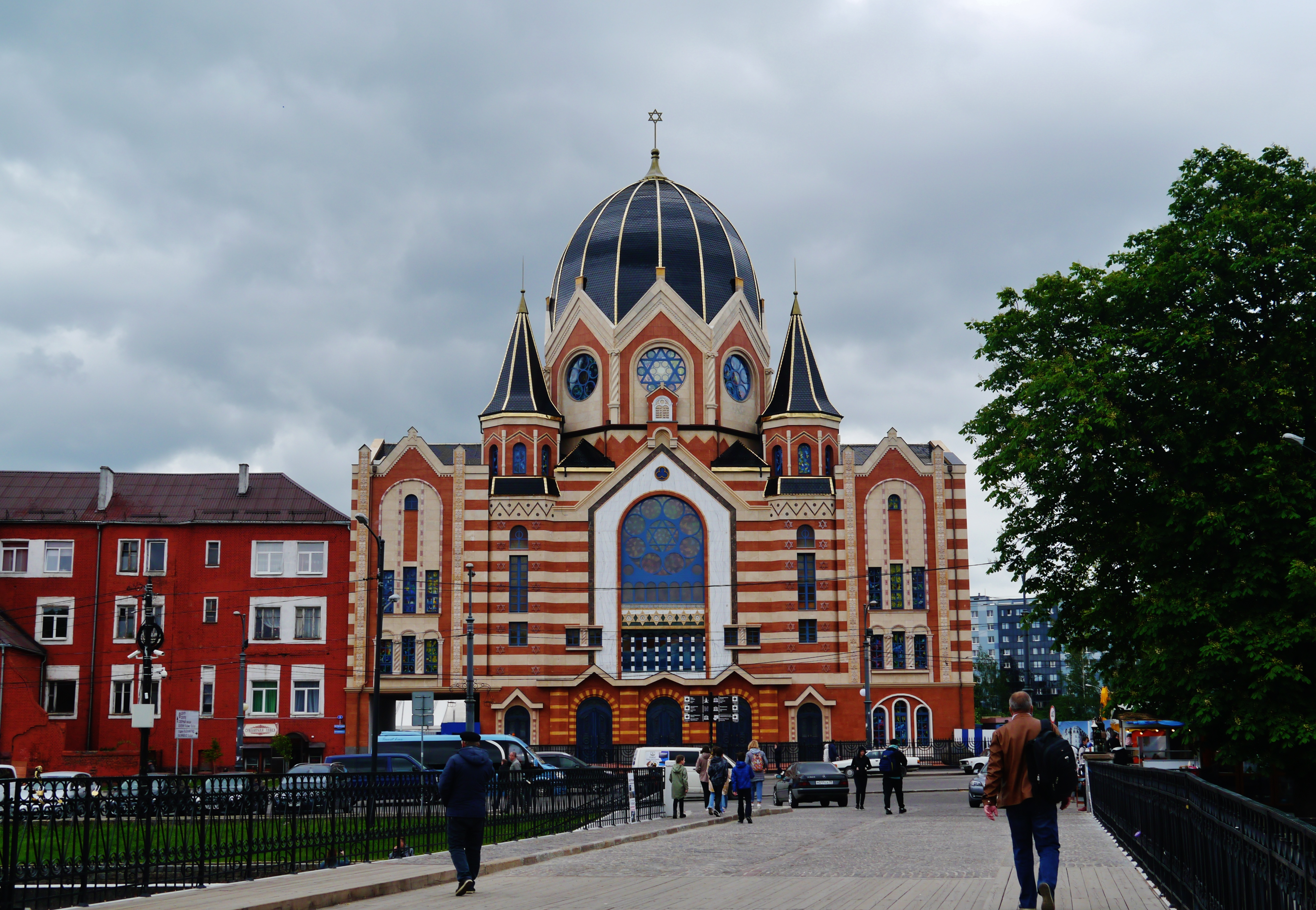
Königsberg Synagogue, rebuilt in 2019

- Königsberg Synagogue, Kaliningrad Oblast

== Kemerovo Oblast ==
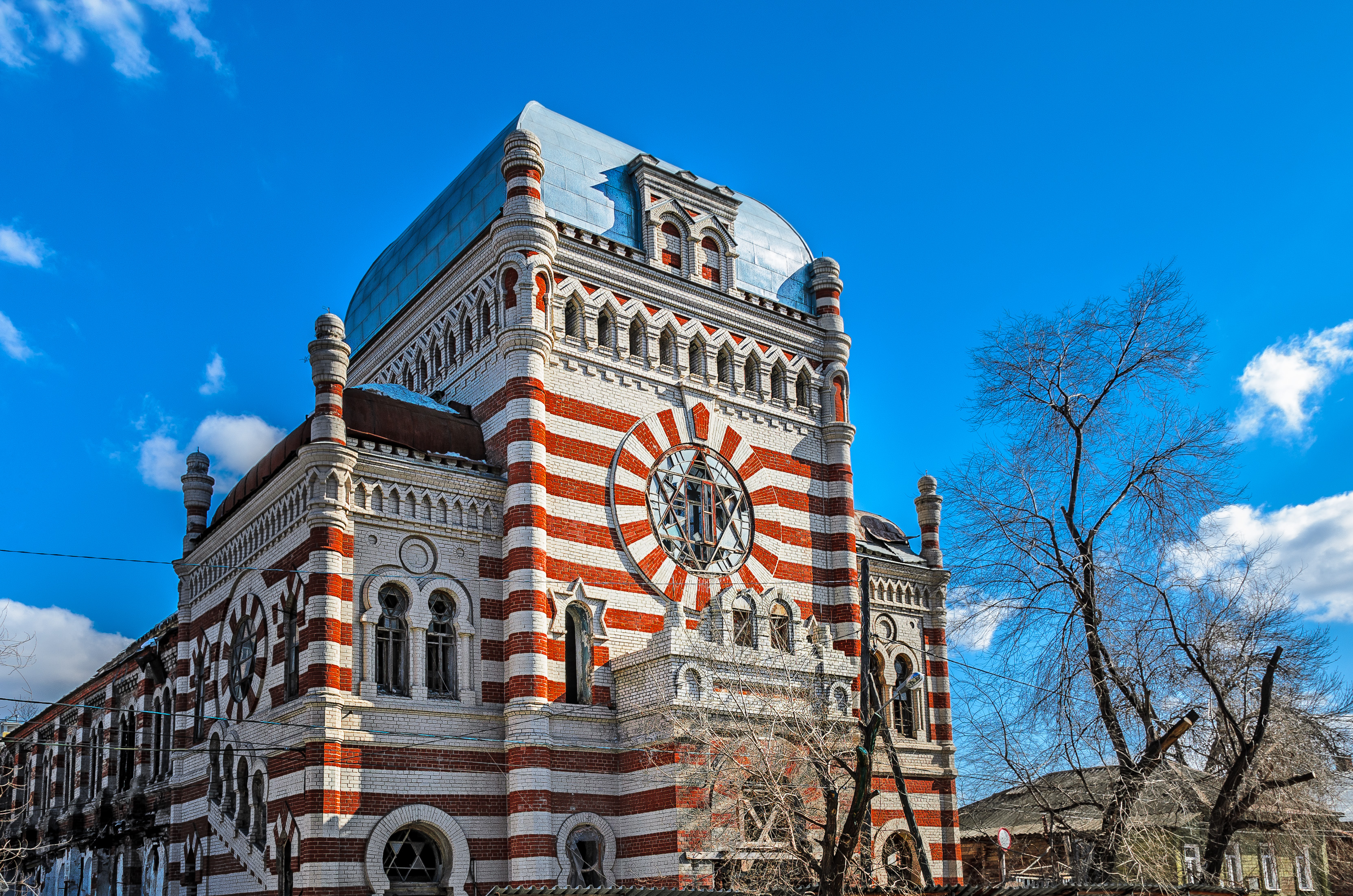
Samara Choral Synagogue

- Mariinsk Synagogue, Mariinsk

== Nizhny Novgorod Oblast ==
- Nizhny Novgorod Synagogue, Nizhny Novgorod

== Primorsky Krai ==
- Vladivostok Synagogue

== Republic of Dagestan ==
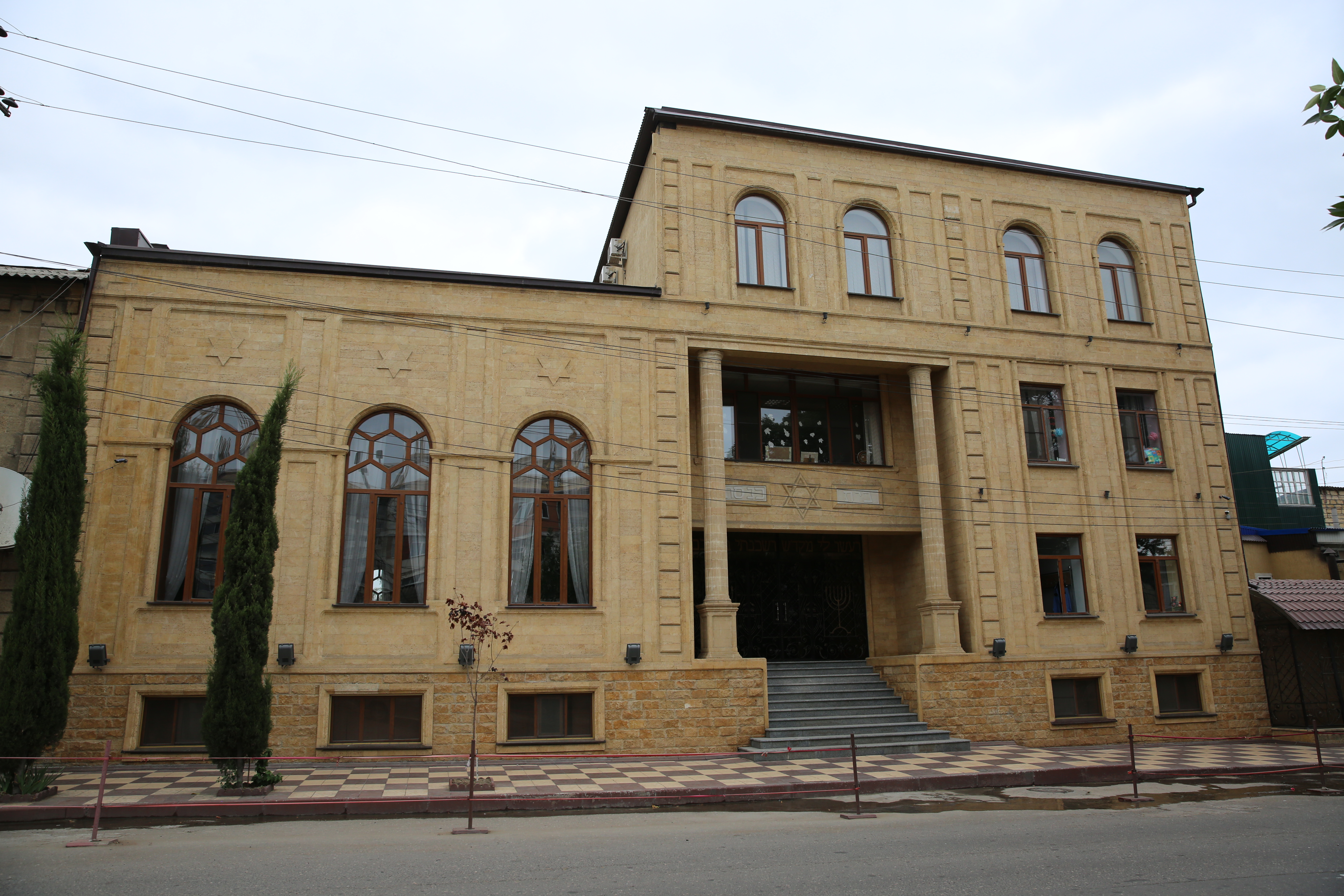
Derbent Synagogue in Derbent, rebuilt in 2009

- Buynaksk Synagogue, Buynaksk
- Derbent Synagogue, Derbent
- Makhachkala Synagogue, Makhachkala

== Republic of Tatarstan ==
- Kazan Synagogue

== Rostov Oblast ==
- Main Choral Synagogue, Rostov-on-Don, Rostov Oblast
- Soldier Synagogue, Rostov-on-Don, Rostov Oblast
- The Artisans' Synagogue, Rostov-on-Don, Rostov Oblast

== Samara Oblast ==
- Samara Choral Synagogue, Samara Oblast

== Smolensk Oblast ==
- Choral Synagogue (Smolensk), Smolensk Oblast

== Sverdlovsk Oblast ==
- Yekaterinburg Synagogue, Sverdlovsk Oblast

== Tomsk Oblast ==
- Tomsk Choral Synagogue, Tomsk Oblast

== Volgograd Oblast ==
- Volgograd Synagogue, Volgograd Oblast

== Voronezh Oblast ==
- Voronezh Synagogue, Voronezh Oblast
