= Wrangel Mansion =

19th-century building

Coordinates: 47.1258°N 39.4306°E

- Дом Врангеля
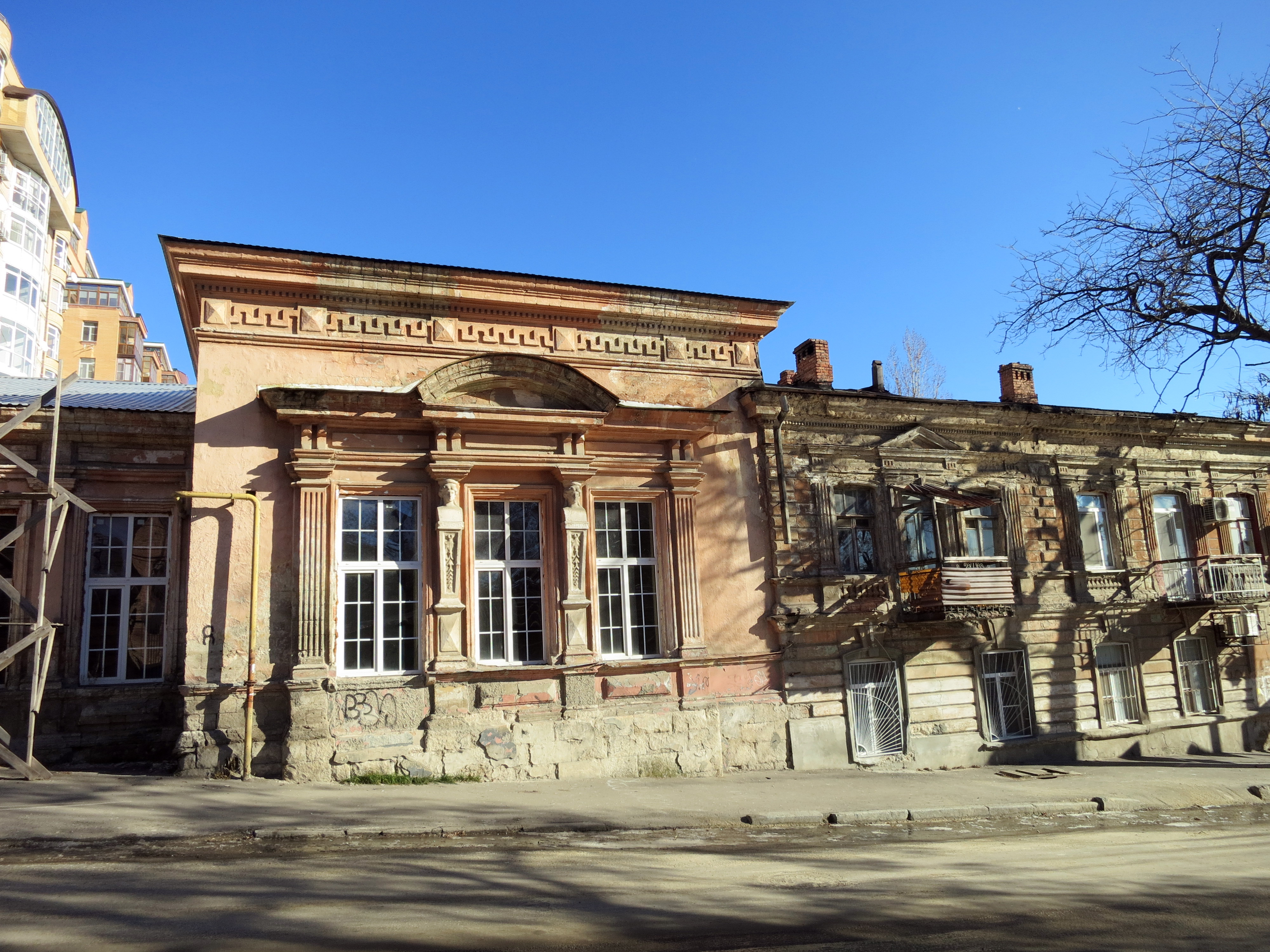
- Established: 1885
- Location: Rostov-on-Don
- Type: Mansion

Wrangel Mansion (Russian: Дом Врангеля) is a building in Rostov-on-Don, built in 1885 by architect Nikolay Doroshenko. In this house Pyotr Nikolayevich Wrangel, one of the main leaders of the White Movement, spent his childhood and youth years. Wrangel Mansion has the status of an object of cultural heritage of regional significance.

== History ==
The mansion in Kazansky (now Gazetny) lane was built in 1885 by architect Nikolai Aleksandrovich Doroshenko. The house first belonged to different owners, but soon it was bought by Baron Nikolai Egorovich Wrangel who moved in here with his family. Nikolai Egorovich was an art critic, a writer and collector of antiques. His wife Maria Dmitrievna is known as woman who initiated the establishment of the first women's Sunday school in Rostov-on-Don. Their eldest son, Pyotr Nikolayevich Wrangel, became one of the leaders of the White movement during the Civil War in Russia.

After the end of the Civil War the building was nationalized and used to house a kindergarten. In the 1990s, the kindergarten was closed and since then the building was in desolation. By the decree of the Head of Administration of Rostov Oblast issued on October 9, 1998, Wrangel House was placed under state protection as an object of cultural heritage of regional significance. In 2006, the building was handed over to Rostov Diocese under the condition of carrying out works to restore it. The Diocese planned to restore the building and establish an educational center and museum in it. In 2011, it was planned to establish a museum of Alexander Solzhenitsyn with an exposition that would be devoted to an epoch, contemporary to both Solzhenitsyn and Wrangel. However, the Diocese was unable to find funds for the restoration of Wrangel House. Only in 2012, the roof was replaced and temporary double-glazed windows were installed. In general, for the past six years, the building has come to an extremely deplorable state. In September 2011, a public action was held near the building to draw attention to the state of the architectural monument. In March 2013 Rostov Diocese sold the house of Wrangel for 9 million rubles and spent them to repair the Cathedral of the Nativity of the Blessed Virgin. The new owner of the building became "Management of Mechanization", Ltd.

In 2015, the issue of demolishing a house and erecting a copy of it at the same place was raised at a meeting of the city administration. The restoration of the architectural monument was estimated at 130 million rubles, and the construction of a copy — only 20. The idea of demolishing the building was strongly criticized by the public.

== Architecture ==
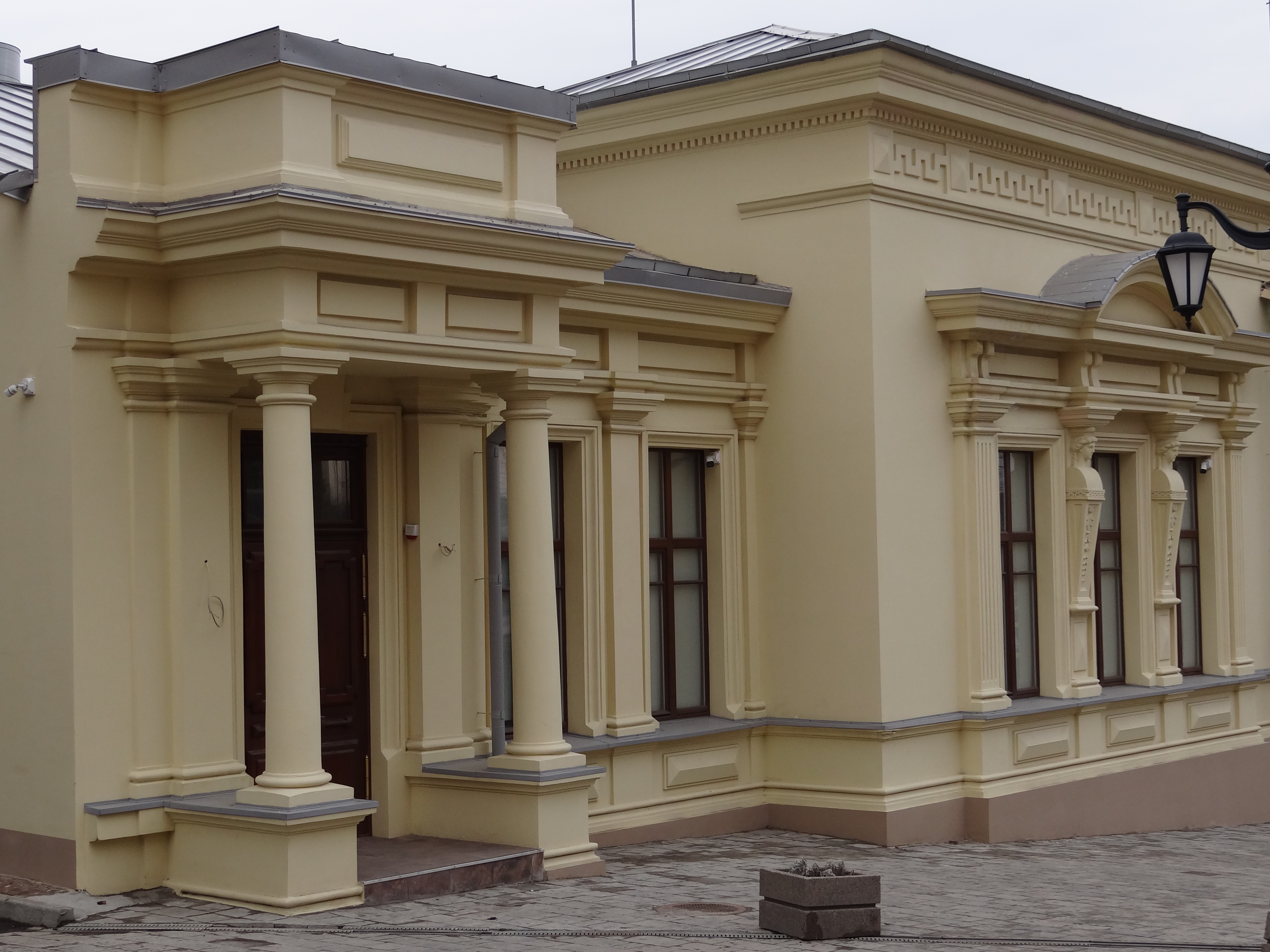
Restored Wrangel mansion.

The main facade of the building has a rich decor. The main entrance is accented by a two-columned Doric portico, topped with a rectangular attic. In the interior, the old stucco molding has been partially preserved.
