= Soldier Synagogue (Rostov-on-Don) =

Synagogue in Rostov-on-Don, Rostov Oblast, Russia

- Russian: Солдатская синагога
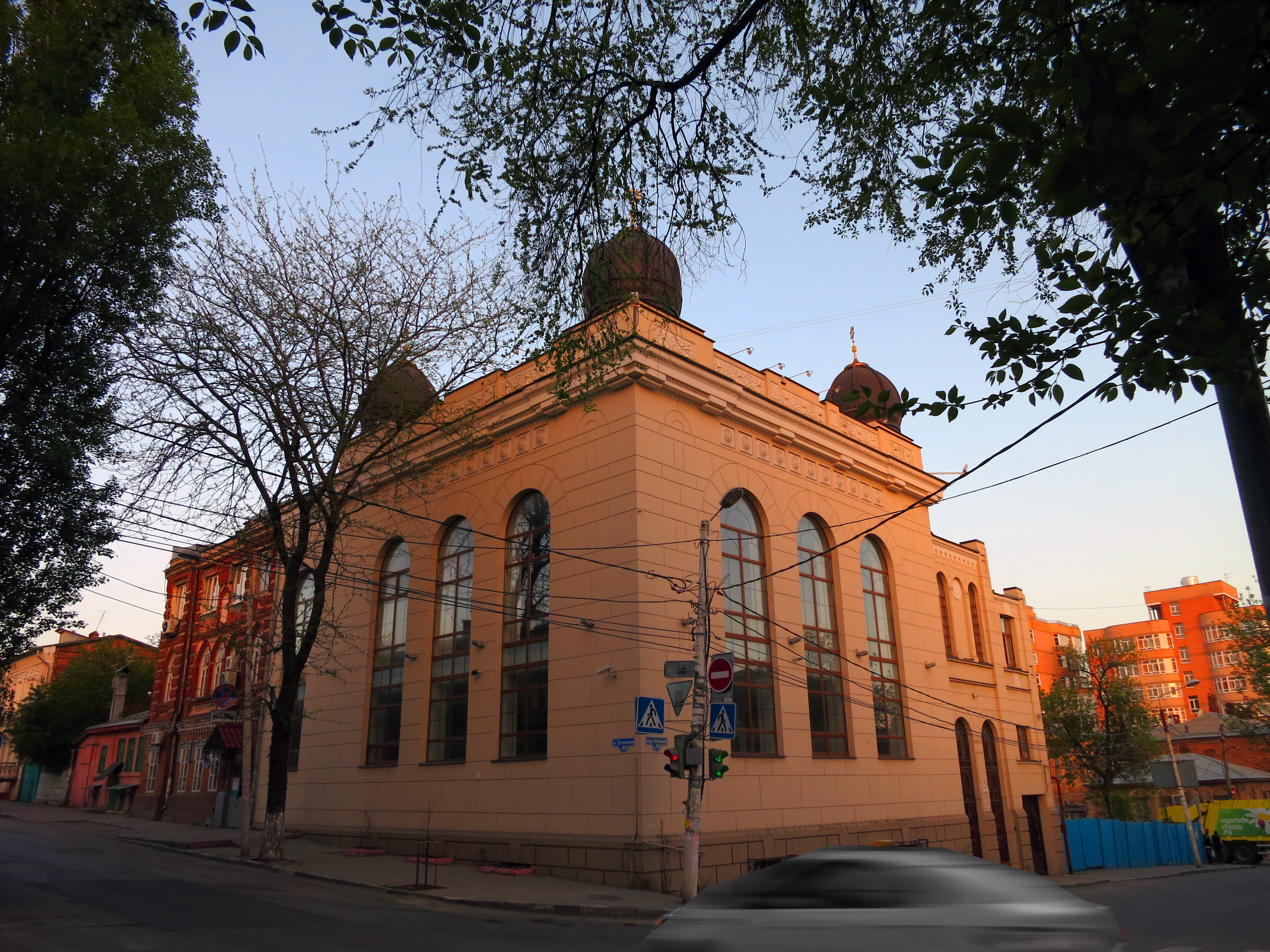
- The synagogue in 2013

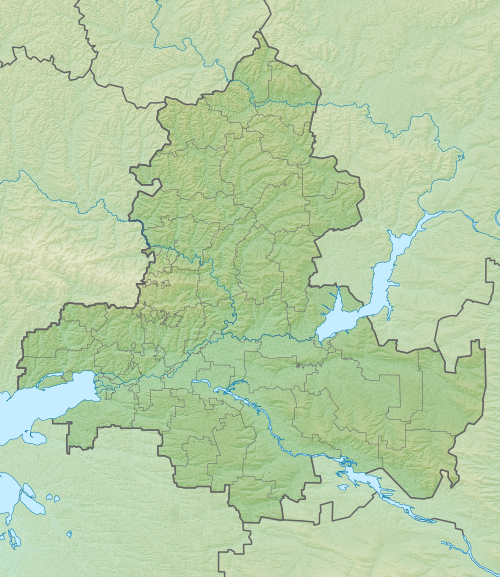
- Location of the synagogue in the Rostov Oblast

Religion
- Affiliation: Judaism
- Rite: Nusach Ashkenaz
- Ecclesiastical or organizational status: Synagogue (1872–1935); Profane use (during WWII); Synagogue (since 1945)
- Status: Active

Location
- Location: 18 Turgenevskaia Street, Rostov-on-Don, Rostov Oblast
- Country: Russia
- Interactive map of Soldier Synagogue
- Coordinates: 47°13′03″N 39°43′05″E

Architecture
- Architect: Yakov Gevirts (Gewürz)
- Type: Synagogue architecture
- Style: Art Nouveau
- Established: 1862 (as a congregation)
- Groundbreaking: 1872
- Completed: 1872; 1913

Specifications
- Dome: Three (maybe more)
- Materials: Brick

The Soldier Synagogue (Russian: Солдатская синагога), or Soldiers’ Synagogue, is a Jewish congregation and synagogue, located at 66-68/18 Turgenevskaia Street, in Rostov-on-Don, in the Rostov Oblast of Russia. It is the only active synagogue in the city. Completed in 1872, the synagogue was burnt down during the pogrom of 1905, and it was restored in 1913-1914 by Yakov Gevirts in the Art Nouveau style. In 1935, the synagogue was closed for worship. After World War II the building was transferred back to the local Jewish community.

The Soldier Synagogue is listed on the Russian cultural heritage register of regional significance.

== History ==
In 1862, retired Jewish soldiers established Jewish Prayer Society in Rostov-on-Don. On May 31, 1862, the Yekaterinoslav province government gave to society a permission to rent a separate room for worship rituals. The project of Choral Synagogue was approved by Rosotov authorities on June 4, 1872, and in the same year the building was constructed. According to some reports, the money for the construction of synagogues were donated by Rostov merchant Joseph Markovich Elitser. It is presumed that the architect of the synagogue was Ernst Ernestovich von Shulman, and the building contractor ― Moisey Leontyevich Geronimus.

The synagogue building was reconstructed several times. In 1881, in the east part of it there was attached a three-story brick building. In 1891, to the south wall of the synagogue there was also attached a two-storey building, the ground floor of which housed a school for children of poor soldiers, and the second floor was occupied by Prayer school. The synagogue was seriously damaged by fire during the anti-Jewish pogrom in 1905. It was restored during 1913–1914, when the necessary funds were collected. The author of the reconstruction project was Petersburg architect Yakov Germanovich Gevirts. Worship in the synagogue resumed on March 29, 1914, on the day of Passover.

In 1935, the synagogue was closed for worship. The building housed a chemical factory. During the war, these enterprises were evacuated from the city. In 1943, after the liberation of Rostov-on-Don, the synagogue was resumed by the Jewish community. Official permission to use the building by the Jewish community was sanctioned on April 14, 1945.

In 2005 a major overhaul of the synagogue was implemented. The corner dome, with stars of David that were lost in the 1940s, was restored. Reconstruction works were completed by the end of the year, and on 26 December the synagogue was opened.

== Architecture ==
The architecture of Soldier Synagogue has elements of Art Nouveau and Oriental styles. The building has a complex configuration plan. Three parts of the building volume are reduced to north–south axis.

The light openings in the top of the bindings are patterned, stylized with gothic rose. The cap of the synagogue is decorated with rustication, and the façade is decorated with stucco rosettes.

== Gallery ==
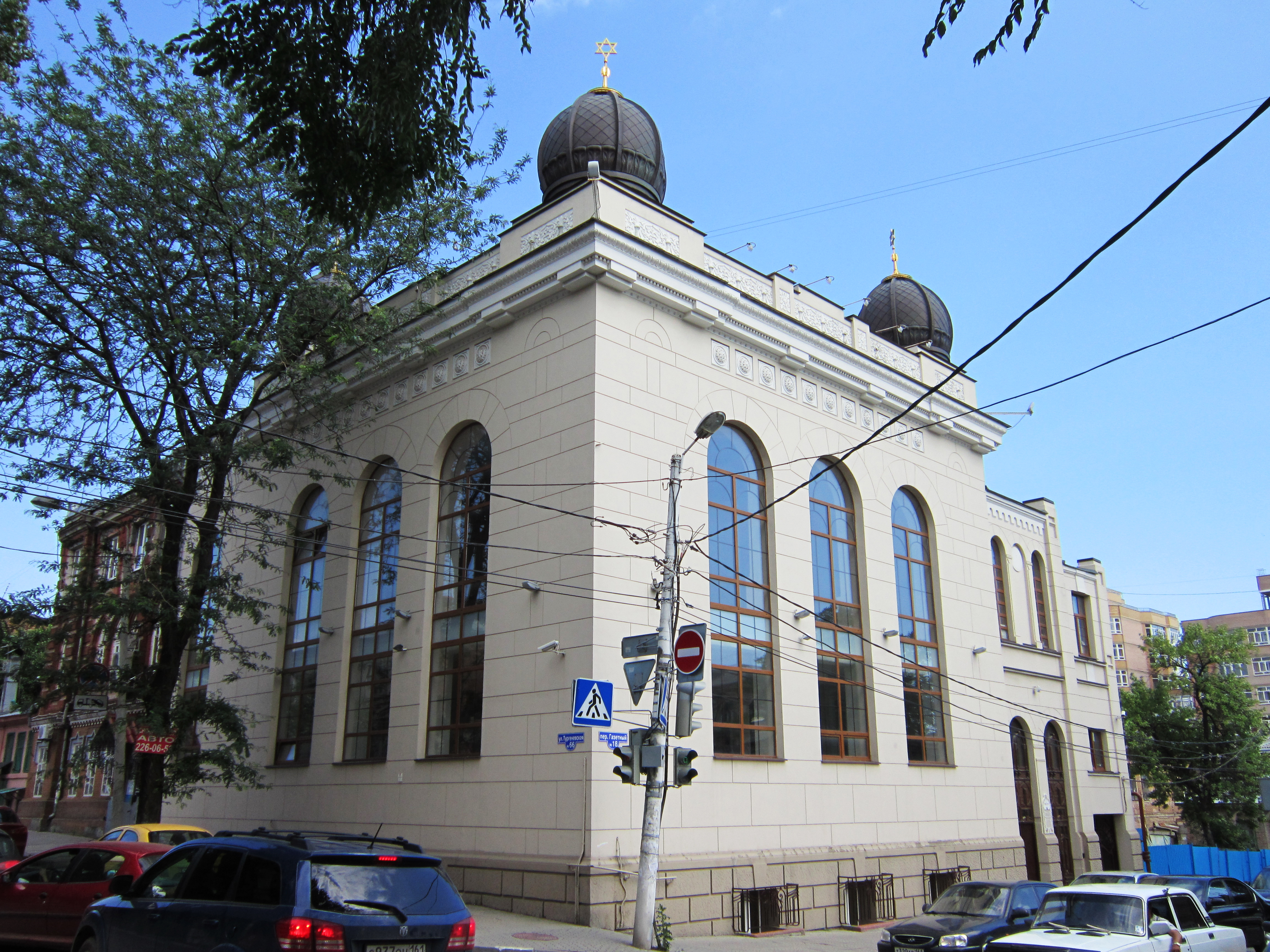
The synagogue in 2012

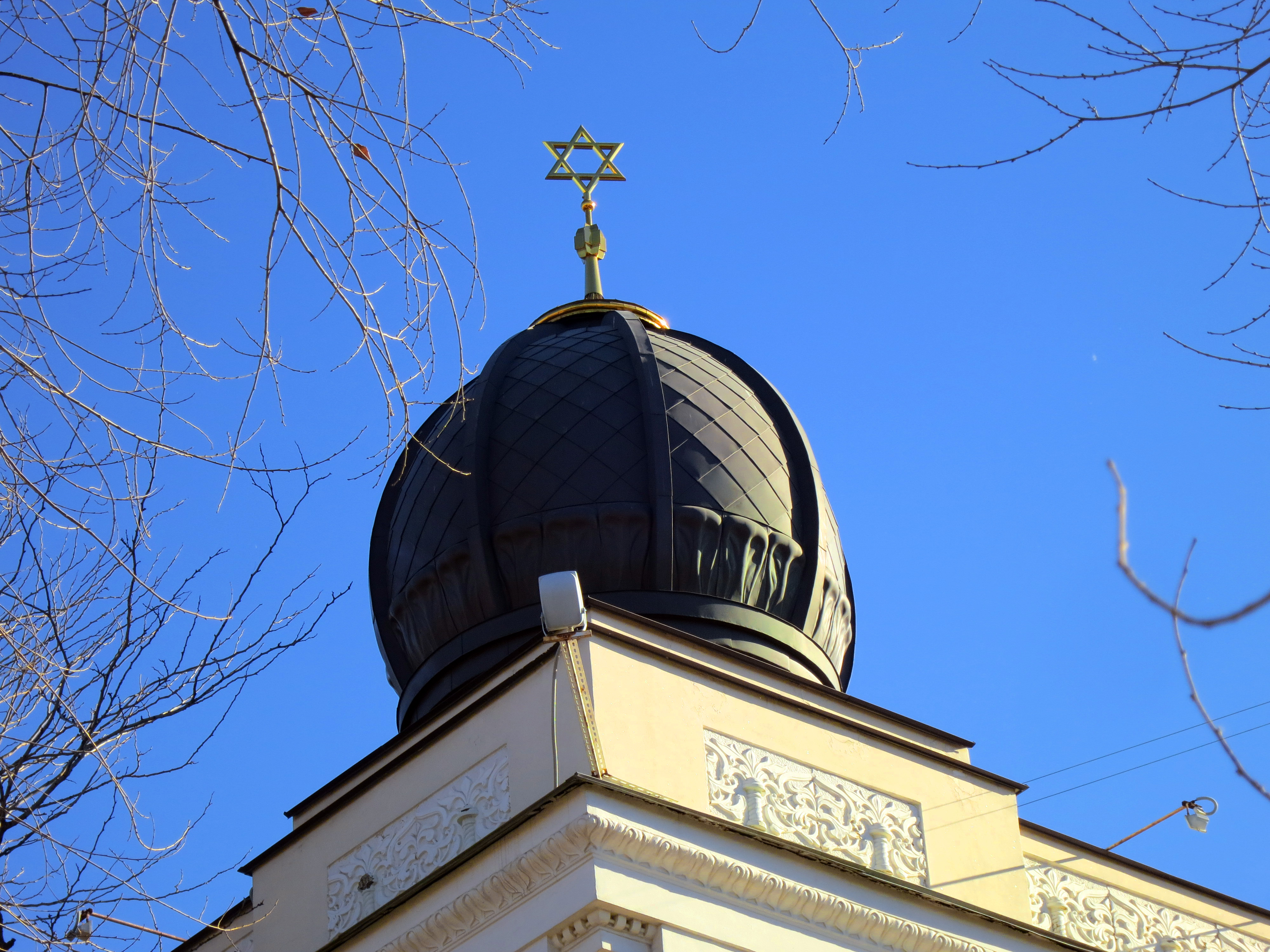
Close-up showing decorative trim and details of dome

Commemorative on the plaque on the synagogue

== See also ==
- History of the Jews in Rostov-on-Don
- List of synagogues in Russia
