= Edward Chaprak =

Jewish philanthropist

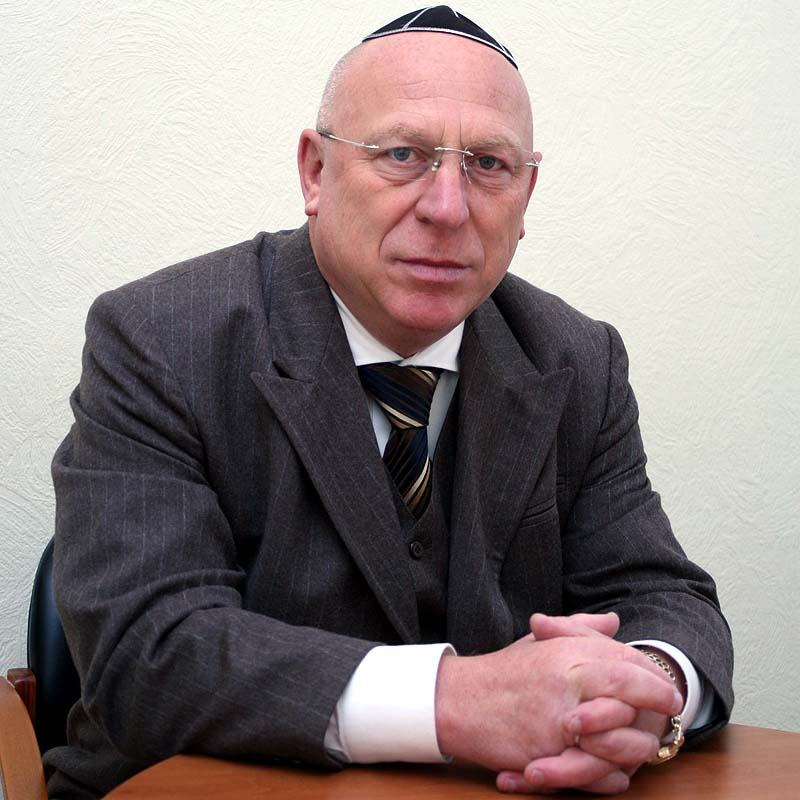

Edward M. Chaprak (born July 5, 1945, in Nizhny Novgorod, called Gorky during the Soviet period) is a leader of the Jewish community in his home town. He is the chairman of the Nizhny Novgorod Synagogue. He is also an entrepreneur and philanthropist.

== Life and business ==
He was born into a family of disabled veterans of World War II, and graduated from the Leningrad Institute of Physical Culture. He entered the catering business in 1973 and has been the CEO of the "Kulinar" company since 1992. The company produces about 400 kinds of confectionery products, as well as 12 kinds of alcohol-free drinks.

== Charitable and community work ==
He is actively involved in charity work: participating in nutrition programs for children, the homeless and other vulnerable populations.

He never lost connection with the Jewish community and adhered to its traditions even in the darkest years of economic and social stagnation in the 1970s - 1980s. He regularly provided minyan for prayers in private apartments and defended the return of Torah scrolls which the KGB had seized as "evidence" in the investigation of criminal cases.

Since the revival of religious life, he has become actively involved in the restoration and repair of the older synagogues and other projects. He was selected as the chairman of the Jewish religious community in 1998. With his support a fundamental reconstruction of the central synagogue was begun in 2005 and a new community center is now under construction and expected to be complete by 2009.
