= Elena Shirman =

Russian Jewish poet (1908–1942)

Elena Mihailovna Shirman
- Елена Михайловна Ширман
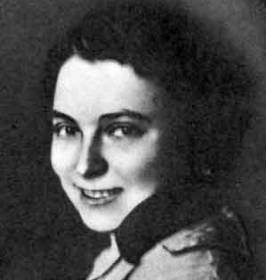
- Born: February 3, 1908; Rostov-on-Don, Russian Empire
- Died: 1942; Remontnoye, Rostov Oblast, RSFSR, USSR
- Citizenship: USSR
- Writing career
- Pen name: Irina Gorina, Alena Krasnoshchekova, et al.
- Language: Russian
- Years active: 1928-1942
- Genre: Poetry

Elena Mihailovna Shirman (Russian: Елена Михайловна Ширман; 1908–1942) was a Russian Jewish poet killed in 1942 in the Second World War by the Nazis.

== Early life and education ==
Elena Mihailovna Shirman was born on February 3, 1908, in Rostov-on-Don, Southern Russia. Her father was a navigator and her mother was a teacher. She studied at the Library College in Rostov-on-Don before transferring to the Russian Language and Literature Department of the Rostov State Pedagogical Institute, from which she graduated in 1933. After graduation she worked in a library and at several museums. From 1937 to 1941 she studied under Ilya Selvinsky at the Gorky Literary Institute.

== Career ==
Shirman first began publishing her work in 1924, first in local periodicals and later in the Moscow journals October (Октябрь) and Change (Смена). She also collected and edited folk tales.

From 1933 to 1936 she worked at various jobs, including bookkeeper for a group of tractor operators, and kitchen assistant at Selmash, then the Soviet Union's largest manufacturer of wheat-harvesting machinery. While at Selmash she also taught literature and culture to the children of factory workers. While studying at the Gorky Literary Institute, she also edited several local periodicals and consulted for two youth newspapers, Lenin's Grandchildren and Pioneer's Truth.

At the start of World War II she was drafted into the army, where she served as editor of the army newspaper, Direct Sights, in which many of her satirical poems appeared. She also wrote copy for posters and propaganda leaflets. Her poetry collection, To the Fighter of Unit N, was published in 1942.

== Personal life ==
Much of Shirman's writing centers around her unrequited love for a younger man named Valery Marchikhin. She first met Marchikhin when she was in her late twenties, teaching creative writing to youths aged 13 to 15; he was her most promising student. She continued to correspond with him through the late 1930s.

In 1939, they met again in person. By this time, Marchikhin was a handsome young soldier in the Red Army, and Shirman was a socially awkward, lonely 31-year-old woman. Shirman became infatuated with him, writing many letters to him and poems about him. She did not receive the news of his death in 1941, and assumed he was simply not interested in her. Her best known poem, titled simply, The Last Poem, is in the form of a farewell letter to Marchikhin. In the poem, the narrator (presumably Shirman) speculates that she will probably die soon; whether by murder, suicide, or some other cause, is not clear.

== Death and legacy ==
In July 1942, while traveling through the frontline area as a member of the editorial group of the regional Soviet newspaper Molot (Hammer), she was captured by Nazis at the Remontnaya railway station in Rostov Oblast, and never heard from again. It was not until twenty years later that the details of her death came to light. According to a woman who lived in the house next door to the station, Shirman's Soviet passport indicated that she was Jewish; as a result, Shirman was included, along with her parents, in a group of Rostov Jews who were arrested and killed. Shirman was forced to watch as the Nazis shot her parents, and then dig their graves. The next day she was forced to undress and dig her own grave, then beaten to death with a shovel. The witness was able to rescue some of Shirman's notebooks from the trash, where the Nazis had thrown them.

A collection of Shirman's poems was published in Moscow in 1969, and her work is included in several Russian-language anthologies. Natalia Bakulina has published an account of her friendship with Shirman ("Lena"). A selection of Shirman's poems, translated to English, appears in Young Jewish Poets Who Fell as Soviet Soldiers in the Second World War by Rina Lapidus, who describes Shirman as an unwitting feminist.

== Works ==
- Shirman, Elena. To the Fighter of Unit N. Rostov-on-Don: Rostov Publishing House, 1942.
- Shirman, Elena. To Live. Moscow: Soviet Writer Publishing House, 1969.
- Vasin, A., ed. Anthology of 20th Century Russian Lyricism (Антология русской лирики. Двадцатый век.) Moscow: Studiia, 2000.
- Vasilchenko, M. and Shirman, E., eds. The Emerald Ring (Изумрудное кольцо). Rostov-on-Don: Rostov Publishing House, 1966.
