= Orthodox Churches of Rostov-on-Don =

Orthodox churches in Rostov-on-Don were built during the 17th–20th centuries; they played a role in shaping of the architectural appearance of Rostov-on-Don. They created the high-altitude dominants.

== Terminology ==
Some churches have a special status and referred to as soborny khram (соборный храм) or simply sobor, from the Old Russian word for "gathering" (see “sobor” for other meanings). In Greek, diocesan sees are referred to as καθεδρικός ναός. In Russian, a cathedral is a "sobor" (Russian: кафедральный собор, kafedralny sobor). The seat of the Patriarch is called a "patriarchal sobor" (Патриарший собор, Patriarchiye sobor)

== Architecture ==
Orthodox church buildings have the following basic shapes, each with its own symbolism:

- Elongated: rectangle, rounded rectangle (oval), symbolizing the ship as a means of salvation (Noah's Ark)
- Cruciform (cross shaped)
- Star shaped
- Circular

== Churches in Rostov-on-Don ==
There are many churches in Rostov-on-Don, including both Orthodox and those of other religions.

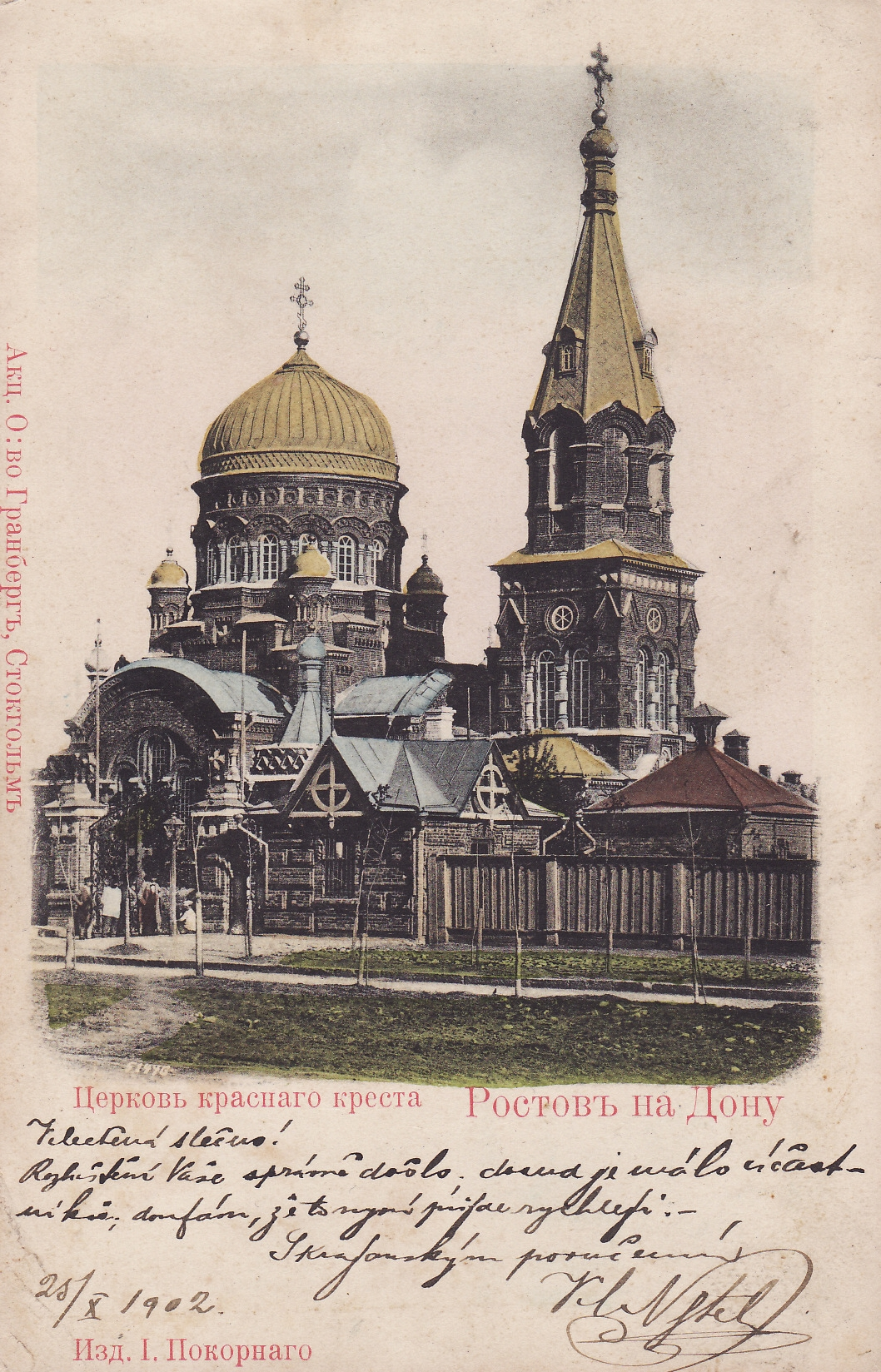
Rostov-on-Don cerkov 1902

One of them is The church of St. Michael the Archangel (the Church of the Red Cross). It was built in Rostov-on-Don in 1894 in the image and likeness of the church -monument in Borki. In the Soviet era the church was closed and by the beginning of the 1960s completely demolished.

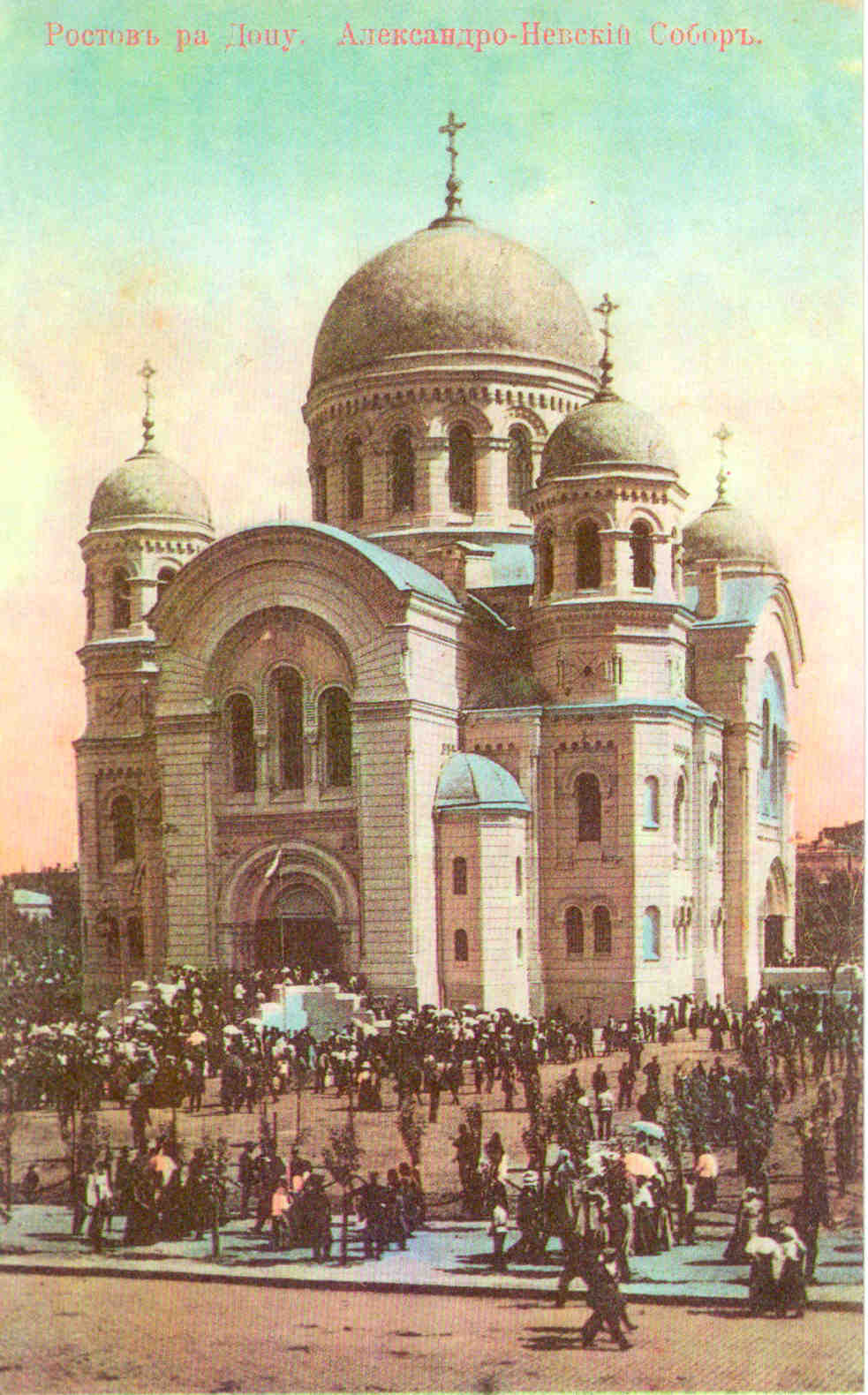
Александро-Невский собор Ростов-на-Дону

Alexander Nevsky Cathedral(Russian: Александро-Невский собор (Ростов-на-Дону)) – another destroyed cathedral of Rostov-on-Don in 1930. The cathedral was situated on Novaya Bazarnaya Square, at the intersection of Bolshaya Sadovaya Street and Bolshoy Stolypinsky Prospect (now Voroshilovsky Prospekt).

== Cathedral Church of Nativity of the Blessed Virgin ==
Basic information

Location	Rostov Region, Rostov-on-Don, Stanislavsky, 58
Affiliation	Russian Orthodox
Status	Active
Schedule of services	Daily: 7.30 am – morning service 5.00 pm – evening service
Patronal feast	The Nativity of the Blessed Virgin Mary he Intercession of the Holy Virgin – September 21

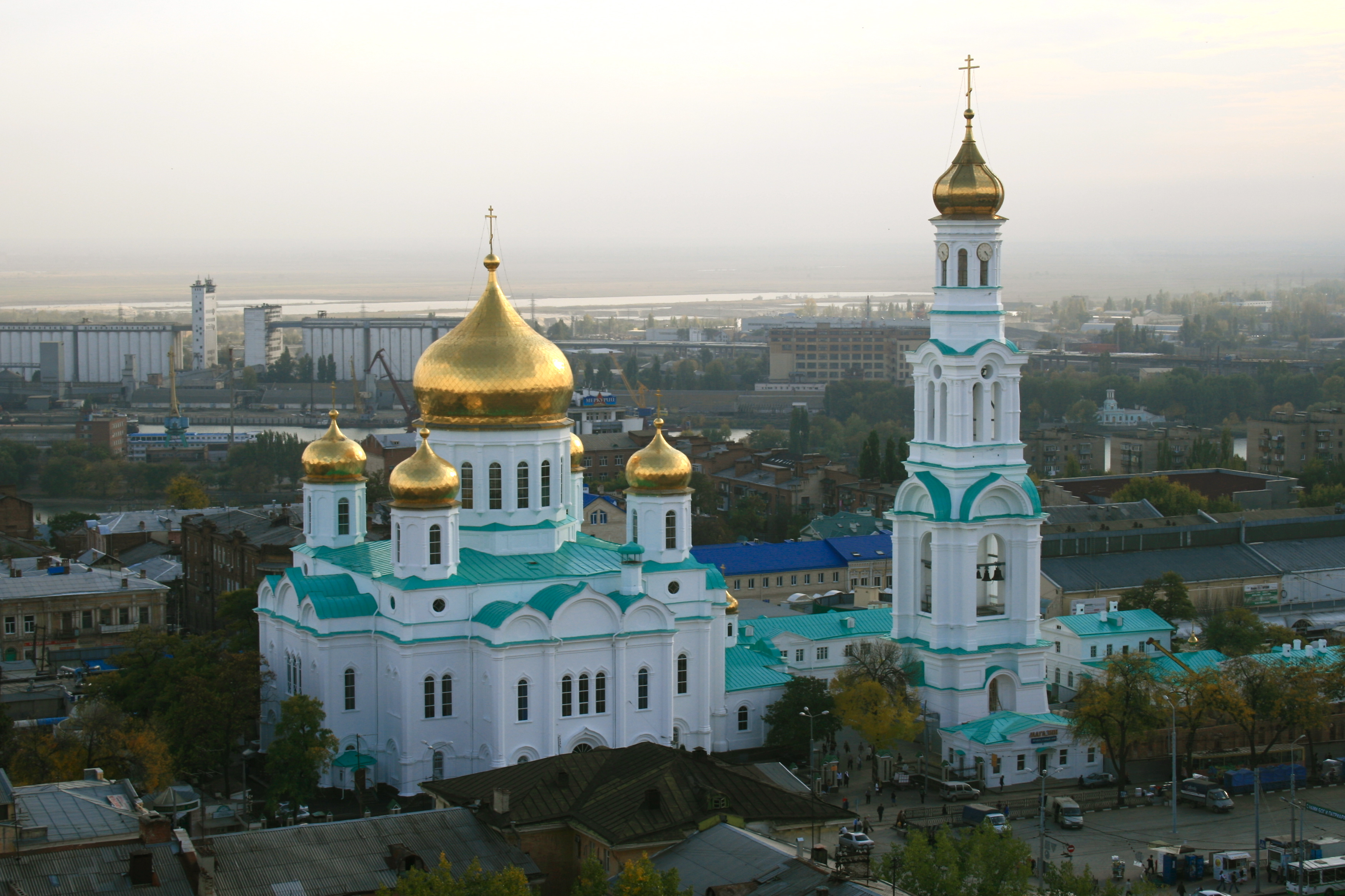
Кафедральный собор в Ростове

Cathedral of the Nativity of the Blessed Virgin Mary (Russian: Собор Рождества Пресвятой Богородицы (Ростов-на-Дону)) ― a cathedral of the Diocese of Rostov and Novocherkassk.

At the end of the 18th century, the city authorities decided to build a temple dedicated to the Navity of the Blessed Virgin Mary. It was meant to be constructed in the same suburb, near the present-day Central market. The church was founded on February 20, 1781, and opened on September 5, 1781.

Due to rapid population growth in Rostov, in 1854 Emperor Nicholas I approved the draft of a new stone church instead of old stone one with wooden domes, which came into dilapidated state. The cathedral was built in the period from 1854 to 1860 on the standard design made by architect Konstantin Ton.

In 1937 the cathedral was closed, and on its territory was opened a zoo, and the cathedral itself was used as warehouse. In the 1940s the upper tiers of the bell tower were destroyed.

The cathedral was opened again in 1942, when Rostov was occupied by German army.

== Martyr Tsarina Alexandra Church ==
Basic information

Location	Rostov region, Rostov-on-Don, Chentsova, 3
Affiliation	Russian Orthodox
Status	Active
Schedule of services	Monday-Friday: 8.00–18.00

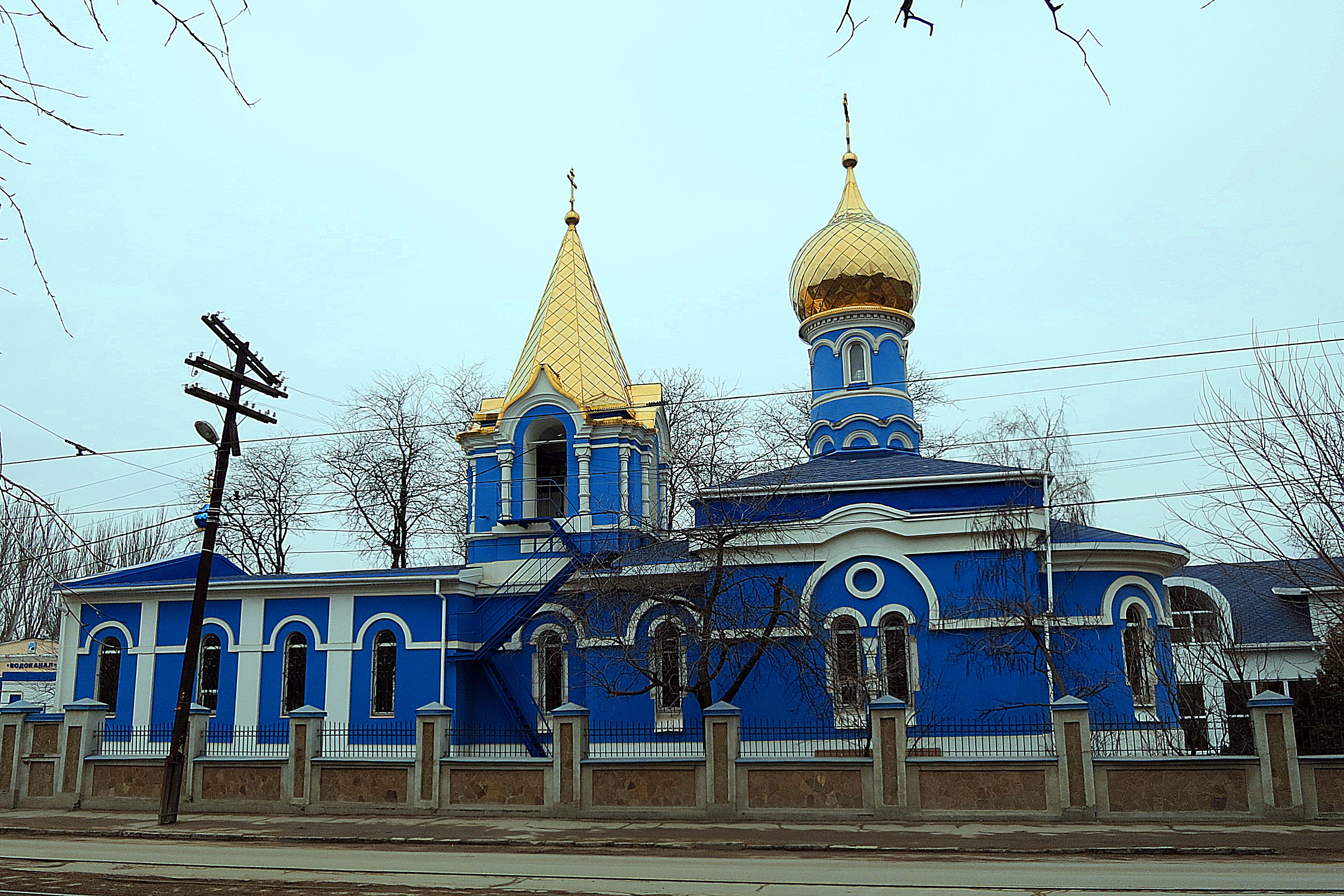
Свято-Александрийский храм 1

Martyr Tsarina Alexandra Church (Russian: Церковь Святой Александры (Ростов-на-Дону)). In the 19th century in the city of Nakhchivan-on-Don, on this place the first wooden cemetery chapel for a burial service of orthodox inhabitants has been erected. Then, in 1904, instead of a chapel has been constructed stone church on the project of the architect V. V. Popov which has remained up to now. In 50th and 70th last century the church was partially reconstructed. New revival of Martyr Tsarina Alexandra Church (the Alexandria temple) in Rostov-on-Don has happened in the 90th years. Today it is a monument of the Russian Orthodox temple architecture of Don of the end of XIX – the beginnings of the 20th centuries and costs on the state protection.

== Christ Ascension Church ==
Basic information

Location	Rostov Region, Rostov-on-Don, Akhtarsky, 3
Affiliation	Russian Orthodox
Status	Active
Schedule of services	Friday, Saturday, Sunday: 9.00 am – morning service 3.00 pm – evening service
Patronal Feast	The Ascension of the Lord – On the 40th day after Easter

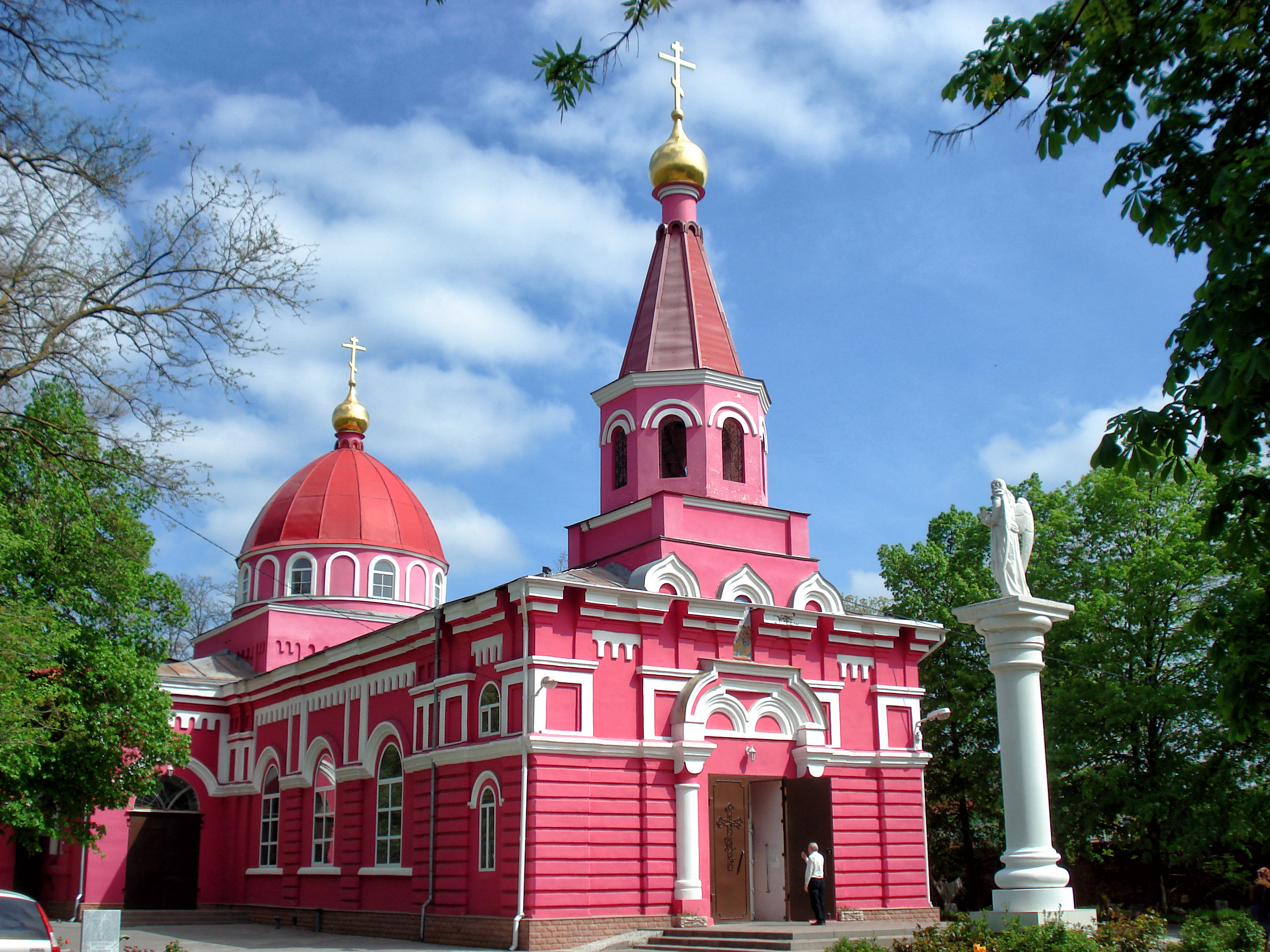
Церковь Вознесения на Братском кладбище

Church of the Ascension of the Lord (Christ Ascension Church) (Russian: Храм Вознесения Господня (Ростов-на-Дону)) ― an Orthodox church, built in 1910–1913 on the territory of Brethren Cemetery in Rostov-on-Don. The church has the status of an object of cultural heritage of regional significance.

In 1892, after a cholera epidemic outbreak outside the city, there had been established a cemetery, which was named Brethren Cemetery (Братское). From 1891 to 1908 at the New Market Square there had been being built the Alexander Nevsky's Cathedral. After the consecration of the cathedral, it was decided not to demolish the church completely, but to disassemble and transport building material to the Brethren Cemetery for the construction of a new church there.

In 1929 the church was closed. "Dinamo" sport stadium used its premises as a warehouse. In 1933, after an appeal to the authorities of the Assumption community in the church was opened again, only to be re-closed again in 1937. In 1930-1940s bell tower and dome of the temple were destroyed. In 1942, during the times of German occupation, the church was re-opened. The official opening of the church took place in 1946, and since then the services have not stopped.

In the late 1990s, restoration works were conducted, during which the bell tower and the dome were restored. In the second half of the 2000s there was carried out reconstruction of church interior.

== The Greek Annunciation Church (The Church of the Annunciation of the Blessed Virgin) ==
Basic information

Location	Russia, Rostov-on-Don, Kirovsky Avenue, 57a
Affiliation	Russian Orthodox
Status	Active
Schedule services	Daily 8.00- 19.00
Patronal feast	The Lady Day (on April 7)

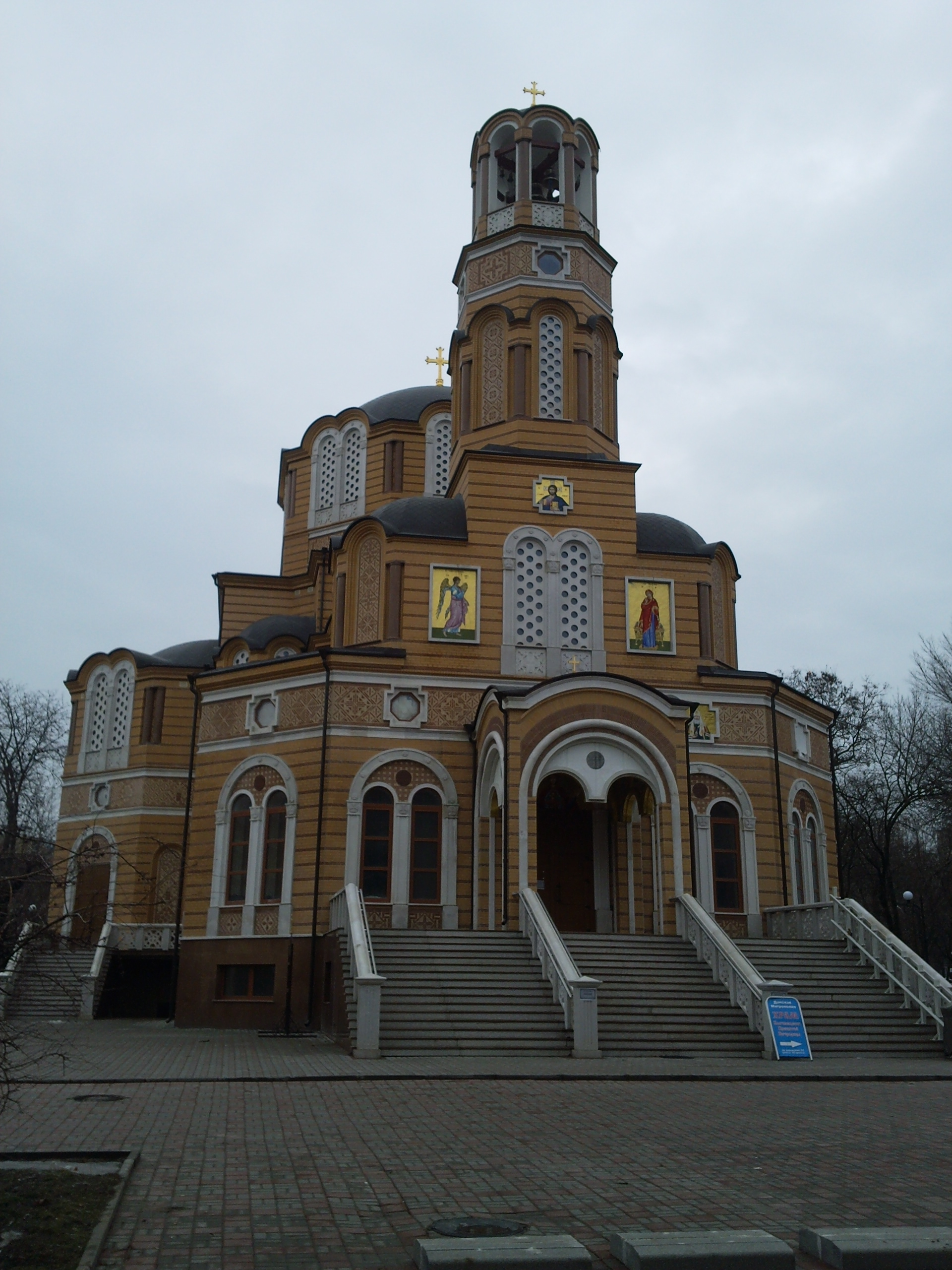
Храм Благовещения Пресвятой Богородицы. г. Ростов-на-Дону. (2)

The Greek Annunciation Church(Russian: Храм Благовещения Пресвятой Богородицы, Благовещенская греческая церковь (Ростов-на-Дону)) was constructed in Rostov-on-Don at the beginning of the 20th century. The temple was located in Tkachyovsky Lane (nowadays Universitetsky) at its crossing with Malo-Sadovaya Street (nowadays Suvorov Street) in the territory belonging to "The Hellenic benevolent society". Funds for construction of the temple endowed the Greeks living in the city. The most considerable donation was made by the owner of tobacco factory Achilles Aslanidi. The temple was put in 1907, and in 1909 the construction was complete.

In the 1930th years the temple was closed and adapted for the children's technical station. During the German occupation of Rostov the temple was reopened. On November 6, 1942 near the Annunciation Church took place the review parade of the Romanian troops devoted to birthday of the Romanian king Mihai I. In this action participated German officers. The parade came to the end with a solemn church service in Annunciation Church.

In 1959 the temple was finally closed. The building was transferred to the next school No. 7. In the former church was placed the gym and industrial practice workshops. In 1964 in this building was situated the Puppet theater (Universitetsky Lane, 46). The building of the temple was saved, but thanks to extensions the appearance changed to unrecognizability.

The solemn laying of the building of the temple took place on September 22, 2007. In 2012 near the temple under construction there was a small temporary church in which will be held church services before the end of construction.

== The Orthodox religious organization Holy Iversky diocesan convent of the Religious organization "Rostov — on — Don Eparkhiya of Russian Orthodox Church (the Moscow Patriarchy)" ==
Basic information

Location	Russia, 344064, Rostov-on-Don, Neklinovskaya St., 4
Affiliation	Russian Orthodox
Status	Active
Schedule services	the monastery and source is open daily from 7:00 till 19:00, the church bench at the temple works daily from 7:30 till 18:30; the book and icon bench works: Monday, Tuesday, Wednesday, Thursday, Friday – 9.00 till 17:00, a break: 14.00 – 15.00
Patronal feast	On October 13, Tuesday of the Bright Week

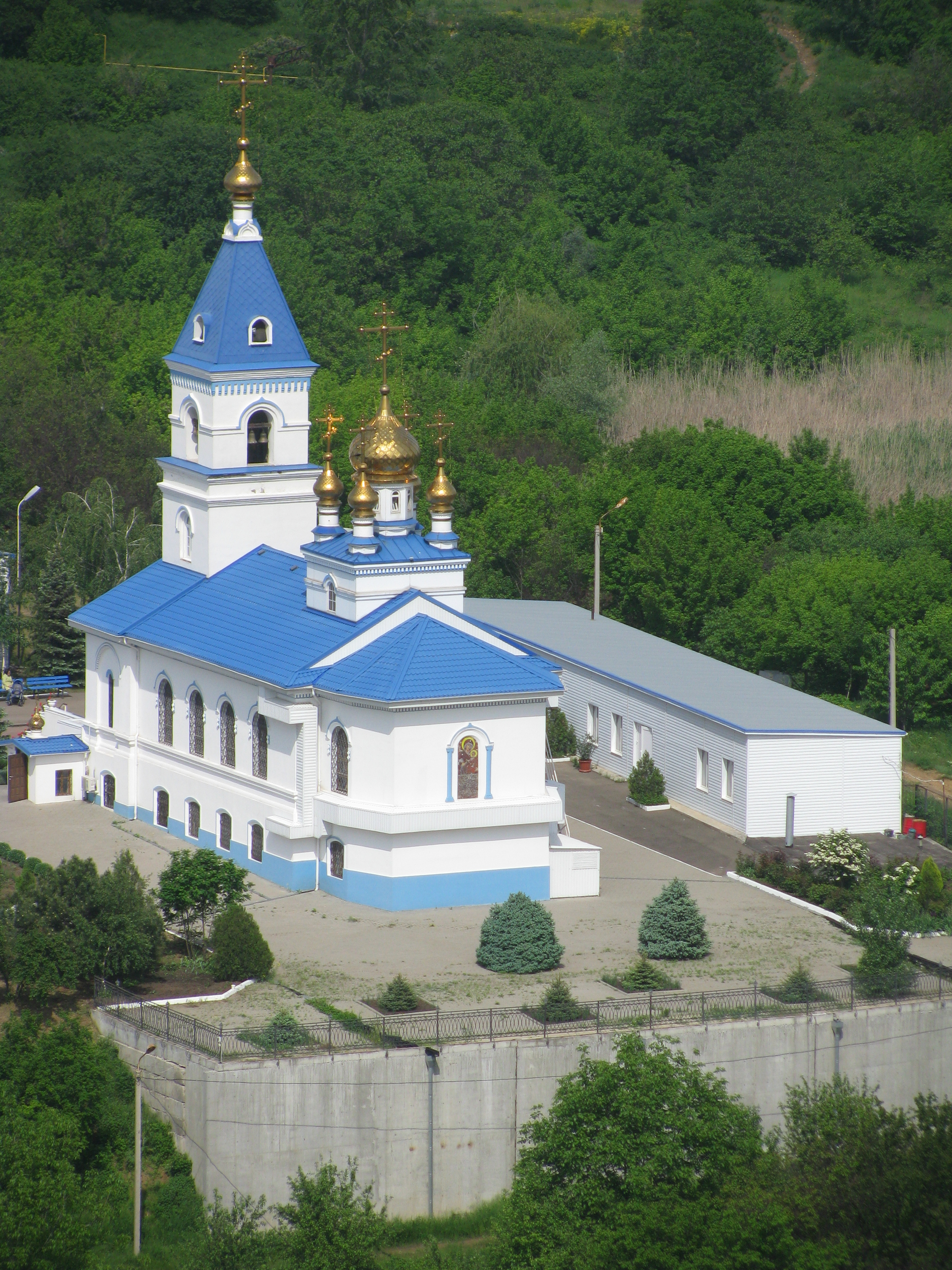
Иверский женский монастырь

The Holy Iversky Convent (Russian: Иверский женский монастырь (Ростов-на-Дону)).

After the October revolution hung the threat of closing of monastery. The Mother Superior Anastasia found the wise solution to register a community as agricultural artel that allowed to keep monastic life in the years of persecutions from the godless power.

Everything broke in 1929. The monastery was closed, the property was transferred to the possession by the states, novices and nuns were expelled, and prosecuted the seventy-year-old Mother Superior with several sisters were sent to Siberia.

After closing of the monastery in the building of the temple placed club of state farm, in the private case – at first orphanage, then workshops, then warehouses.

The fine monastic garden was cut down, the apiary died, kaplitsa was sorted on a stone. The pond turned into the swamp, the sacred source was dirtied. On everything reigned the abomination of desolation.

Now in the monastery there are more than 30 nuns. They daily make church services in the monastery temple, work on a kitchen garden, in subsidiary farm, in the prosfoyena, and bear others monastic obedience.

== The Holy Trinity Church ==
Basic information

Location	344004, Rostov region, Rostov-on-Don, Mezhdunarodnaya St., 7a
Affiliation	Russian Orthodox
Status	Active
Schedule services	Monday-Saturday:7:00–19:00; Sunday: 6:00–19:00
Patronal feast	Trinities Zhivonachalna – June 4

The history of the Holy Trinity church originates since February 28, 1994.

Holy Trinity church (Russian: Церковь Святой Троицы).
On the place of future arrival there was a waste ground on which there was a garbage dump. At the request of locals the Metropolitan of Rostov and Novocherkassk Vladimir (Kotlyarov) caused on February 28 for a conversation of the prior of the temple great martyr Georges the Victorious of the village Masked Matveevo-Kurgansky deanery of the priest Ioann Osyak and appointed him in combination the prior of a community which needed to be organized in arrival, and further build the temple and other necessary structures.

The metropolitan Vladimir (Kotlyarov) dismisses the priest Ioann Osyak of the prior of the temple in the village Masked and appoints him in combination the prior of arrival of the Reverend Seraphim of Sarov who was completely destroyed and needed restoration.

Since November 22, 2004 the ruling bishop appoints the archpriest Ioann Osyak the head of the press center Rostov – on – Don dioceses. He was entrusted to found television station. Active work on arrangement and equipment of diocesan television station began in the first floor of the temple. In the middle of February 2005 the television station was consecrated and began the broadcasting on three television channels of the city of Rostov-on-Don and its area. Now the number of channels increased to 10, covering all Rostov region.

== Church of the Intercession of the Holy Virgin ==
Basic information

Location	Текст ячейки
Affiliation	Russian Orthodox
Status	Active
Schedule of services	Daily except Monday: 9.00 am – morning service 5.00 pm – evening service
Patronal feast	The Intercession of the Holy Virgin – October 14

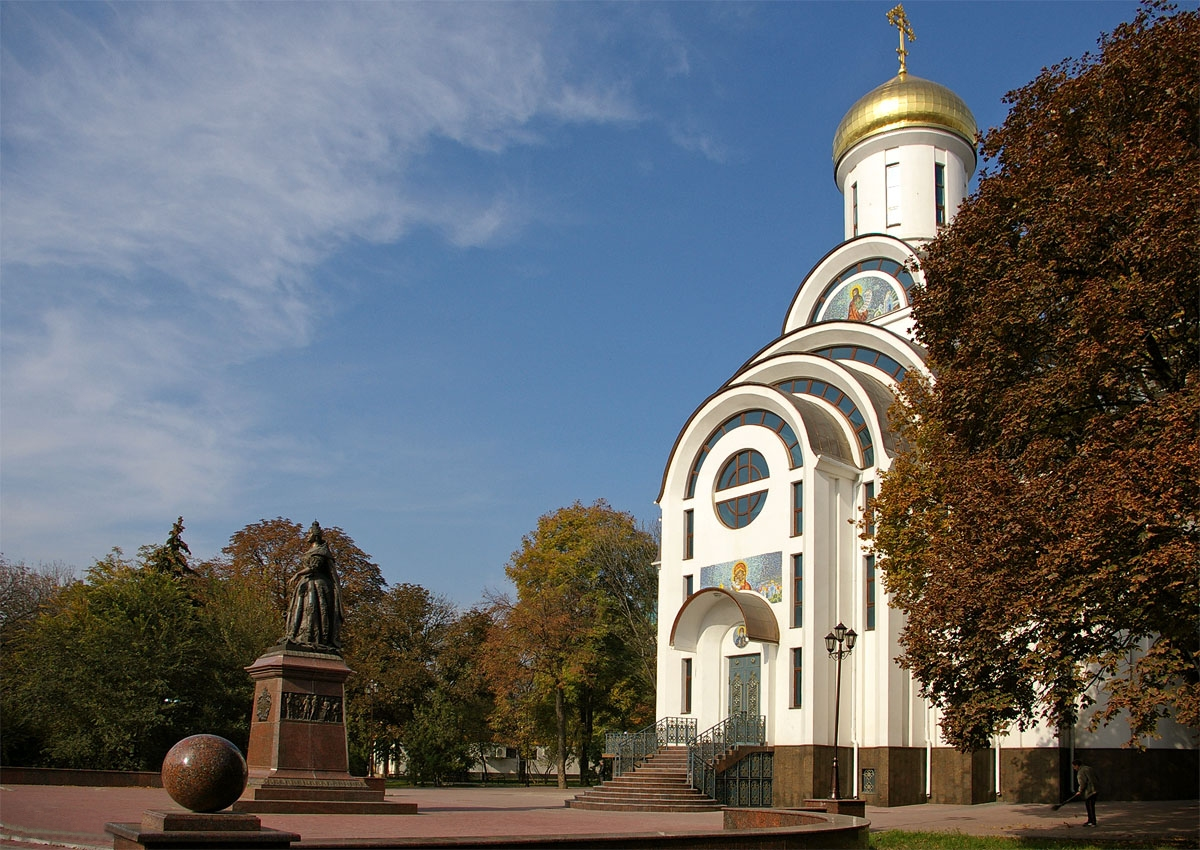
Pokrov's Square Rostov

Church of the Intercession of the Holy Virgin (Russian: Церковь во имя Покрова Пресвятой Богородицы, Покровская церковь (Ростов-на-Дону)) ― one of the oldest churches in Rostov-on-Don (there is a common misconception that it was the first church in the city). The original building was situated approximately at the corner of Bolshaya Sadovaya street. Over time, it has somewhat shifted towards Bogatyanovsky Lane (now ― Kirov Avenue).

In 1762, after the demolition of St. Anne fortress, located near Cherkassk (nowadays ― Starocherkasskaya village) on Vasilyevsky hills, it was decided to transport the Holy Protection Church located therein to the newly built St. Dimitry of Rostov Fortress. The church was dismantled, all logs were numbered and transported to the chosen place.

Over time, there had been grown a need for a bigger church. The old church building was dismantled and almost at the same place a new building (also wooden) was constructed. The consecration of the church took place on September 28, 1784.

On November 2, 1895 due to the negligence of the caretaker there was a fire, which has burned down the bell tower and damaged the building of the church itself.

On August 10, 1897 a new stone building was constructed on the project of architect Nikolay Sokolov.

In the post-soviet times, there were talks about the restoration of the church. On February 3, 2005, at the Kirov public garden was installed and consecrated a memorial cross and was laid the first symbolic stone in the foundation of the new church. Construction of the temple was funded by donations from all over Russia. The church, built on the project of architect G. Shevchenko, received the name of Old-Intercession (Старо-Покровская) and was consecrated on November 11, 2007 by the Archbishop of Rostov and Novocherkassk Panteleimon.

== Church of the Kazan Icon of Madonna ==
Basic information

Location	Rostov Region, Rostov-on-Don, 16a/32a Kosmonavtov Street
Website	www.kazanskoi.ru
Affiliation	Russian Orthodox
Status	Active
Schedule of services	Daily 8.00 am – 8.00 pm
Patronal feast	The Intercession of the Holy Virgin – October 14

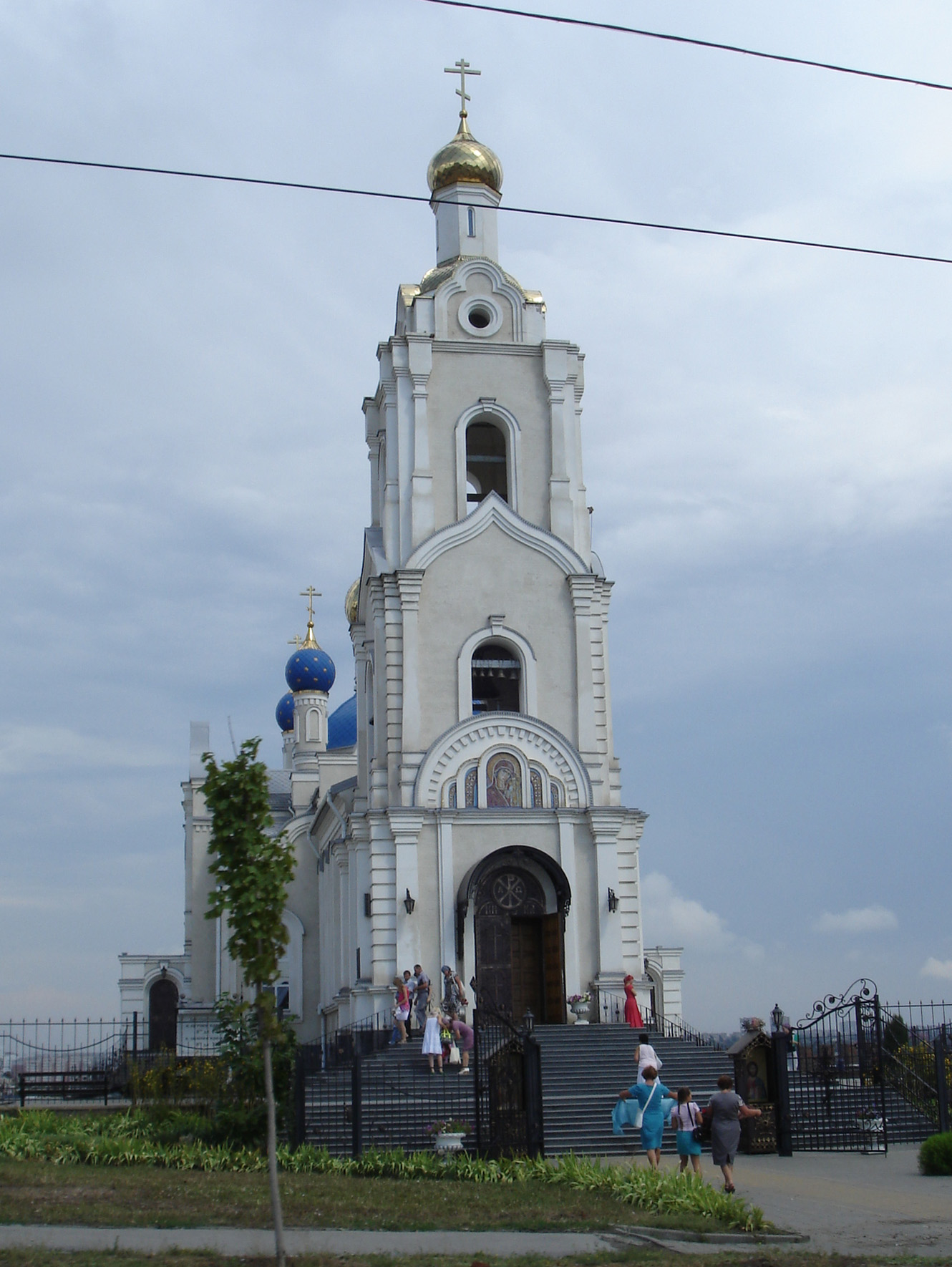
RND-Church-Kazanskoi Ikony Bozey Materi

The Church of the Kazan Icon of the Mother of God (Russian: Храм Казанской иконы Божьей Матери, Казанская церковь (Ростов-на-Дону)) is an orthodox church of Rostov and Novocherkassk diocese Northern deanery of the Moscow Patriarchate.

The Church of the Kazan Icon of the Mother of God was built in Rostov-on-Don near the Northern Reservoir (Russian: Северное Водохранилище). This territory belonged to the Armenian monastery Sourb-Khach (Russian: Сурб-Хач) earlier. In 1996 citizens decided to build this church, because the area lacked orthodox churches. There would be a Holy Kazakh Temple which was destroyed 1931.

Nowadays it is a modern building with heating. The temple is made of brick and has golden domes, the belfry includes 9 bells. Services are held every day, and the church organizes charity dinners as well. Dmitry Sobolevsky is the abbot of the temple.

There are a Sunday School, courses in spiritual studies, pilgrimage trips, all these activities have something to do with the church.

== Church of Holy Hierarch Dimitry, Rostov Metropolitan ==
Basic information

Location	Rostov region, Rostov-on-Don, Muravyev, 28B
Affiliation	Russian Orthodox
Status	Active
Schedule of services	Monday-Friday: 8.00–20.30; Saturday-Sunday: 7.30–20.30
Patronal feast	Day of remembrance of the prelate Dimitriy of the metropolitan Rostov – November, 1

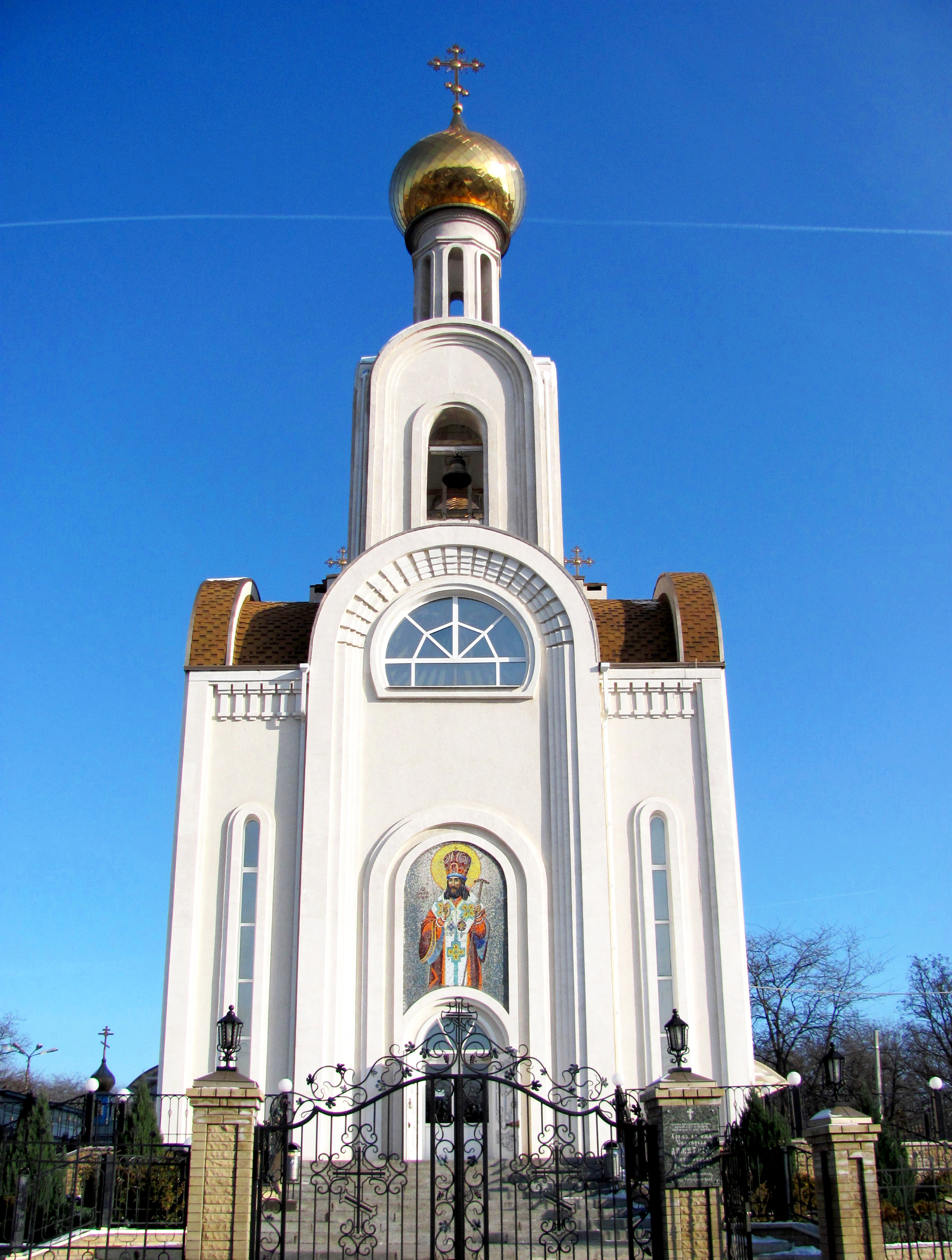
Храм во имя святителя Демитрия, Митрополита Ростовского (Ростов-на-Дону)

Church of Holy Hierarch Dimitry, Rostov Metropolitan (Russian: Церковь Димитрия Ростовского (Ростов-на-Дону)).

On October 4, 1999, in day of his memory, the Archbishop Rostov and Novocherkassk (nowadays Yaroslavl and Rostov) Panteleimon has put the first stone in foundation of future temple, the worthy Heavenly Patron of Rostov-on-Don, on September 15, 2001, in anniversary year of the 350 anniversary since the birth of the prelate Dimitry of Rostov, the Religious Procession during which to the temporary temple became the main event of the City Day (the first Church service has taken place on July 12, 1997.) particles of sacred relics of the prelate Dimitrii and the rights of the soldier Feodor Ushakov, the admiral of the Russian fleet (all in the temple particles of relics of 22 Orthodox Christians of Saints, and also the honored lists of wonder-working icons of Blessed Virgin Mary stay) have been delivered.

== Church of the Great Martyr Saint George the Victorious ==
Basic information

Location	Rostov Region, Rostov-on-Don, the Communist Prospect, 38
Affiliation	Russian Orthodox
Status	Active
Schedule of services	Saturday, Sunday: 8.30 am – morning service 4.00 pm – evening service
Patronal Feast	Saint George –April 23

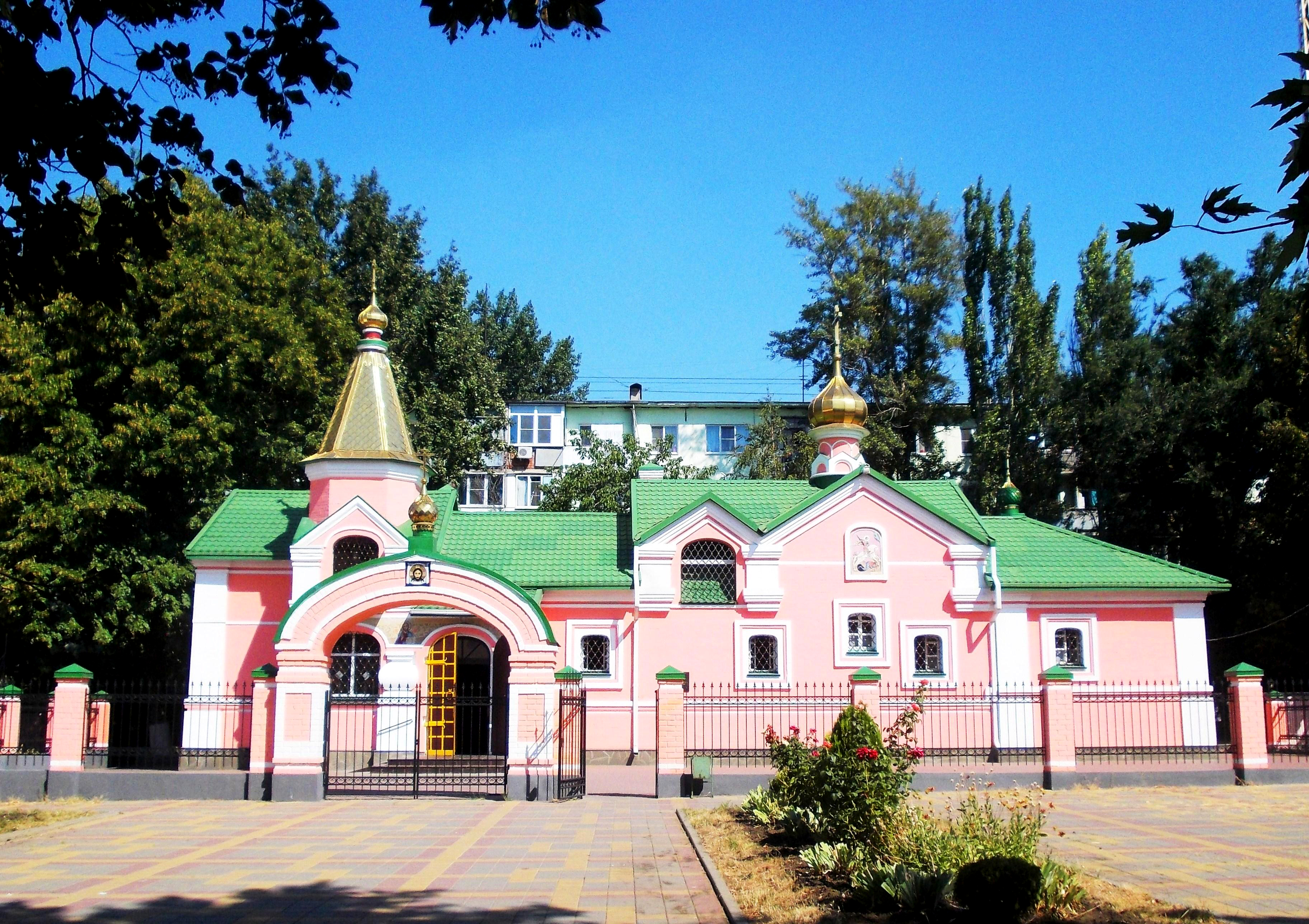
Храм святого Георгия Победоносца, Ростов-на-Дону

Church of St. George the Victorious – (Russian: Церковь Георгия Победоносца (Ростов-на-Дону)) belongs to Rostov and Novocherkassk Diocese of Moscow Patriarchate.

The St. George parish was established in 1993. One-story church was established in 1994 in the residential district of the Soviet district.

In 2003, the construction of a capital annex to the old church building began. By 2007 his decoration continued – the altar and the vaults of the church were painted with canonical images in the Old Russian style.

== The Church of St. John of Kronstadt ==
Basic information

Location	Rostov Region, Rostov-on-Don, the sq. of the Rostov Rifle Regiment of the People's Militia, 1
Affiliation	Russian Orthodox
Status	Active
Schedule of services	Daily: 8.00 am – morning service 5.00 pm – evening service
Patronal feast	St. John of Kronstadt –June 14, October 1

Church of St. John of Kronstadt, Rostov-on-Don (Russian: Церковь Иоанна Кронштадтского (Ростов-на-Дону)) belongs to Rostov and Novocherkassk Diocese of Moscow Patriarchate. It was built in 2010 on the project of architect Genrikh Vasilyevich Ivanov.

The history of this temple began in 1992. On September 29 took place the opening of a chapel at the Rostov State Transport University. The first prayer service in the chapel was hell on September 1, 1993.

The following year, on July 12, Archbishop of Rostov and Novocherkassk Panteleimon consecrated construction site, and on July 26 construction of the church began. The first Divine Liturgy was held there on June 3, 1994.

== Reverend Seraphim Sarovsky Church ==
Basic information

Location	Rostov Region, Rostov-on-Don, 72 Portovaya Street
Website	www.serafim-rostov.cerkov.ru
Affiliation	Russian Orthodox
Status	Active
Schedule of services	Daily 7.00 am – 7.00 pm
Patronal feast	The Day of St. Seraphim Sarovsky – January 15

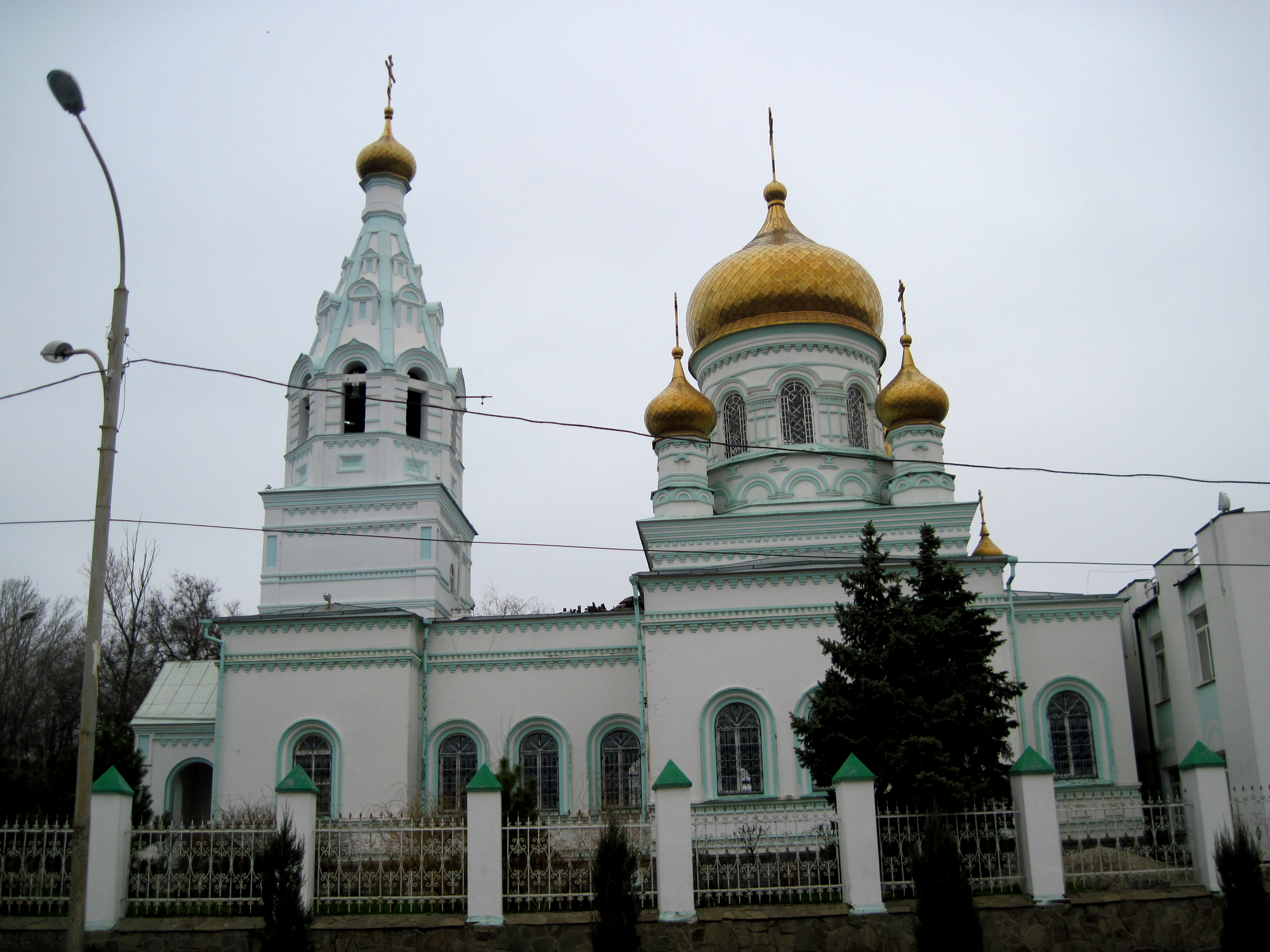
Храм Преподобного Серафима Саровского, Ростов-на-Дону

The Church of St. Seraphim Sarovsky (Russian: Храм Преподобного Серафима Саровского (Ростов-на-Дону)) is an orthodox church in Rostov-on-Don. It was built in Gnilovskaya village between 1904 and 1911 upon the project of the architect B.A. Raychenkov.

The history of the construction of the church dates back to the 19th century. The orthodox citizens of Gnilovskaya village started to erect a temple in honour of St. Seraphim Sarovsky who greatly influenced Russian people.

In 1937 the church was closed, but in 1942 the services started to be held again until 1956. In 1956–1960 the building was reconstructed, but now it was a musical school named after M.I. Glinka. In January 1995 the Rostov and Novocherkassk bishop Panteleimon began to control the reconstruction of the church. Finally, on September 14, 2004 he consecrated the newly built church of St. Seraphim Sarovsky.

== Christ Resurrection (Mid-Pentecost) Church ==
Basic information

Location	Rostov Region, Rostov-on-Don, 165 Vsesoyuznaya Street
Affiliation	Russian Orthodox
Status	Active
Schedule of services	Daily 8.00 am – 5.00 pm
Patronal feast	The Pentecost – the 7th Sunday of Easter

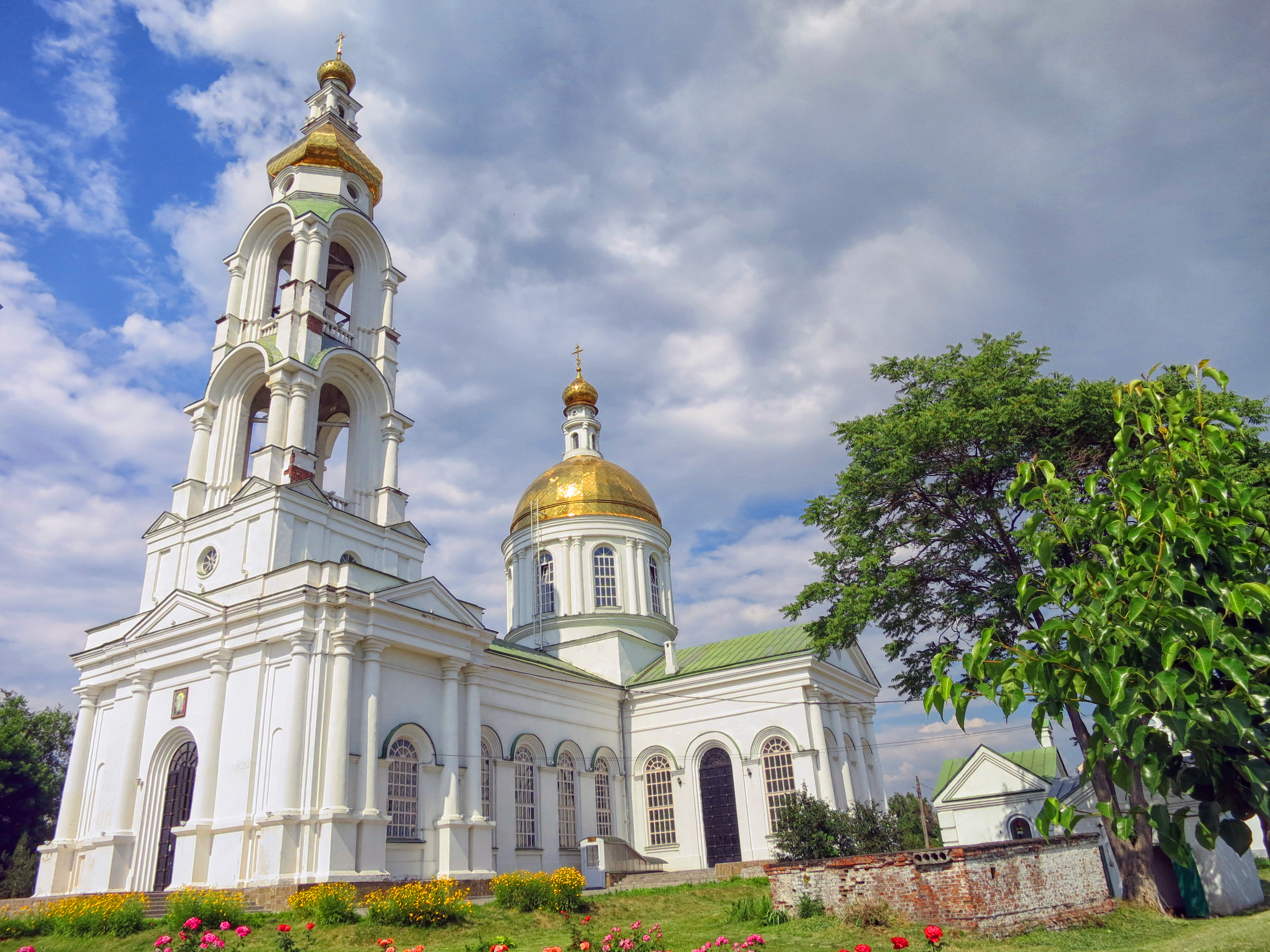
Церковь Преполовения Пятидесятницы (Воскресенская)

The Slavic Pentecostal Church (Russian: Храм Преполовения Пятидесятницы (Ростов-на-Дону))- an orthodox church, is considered to be one of the most significant temples in Rostov-on-Don.

The temple dates from 1824 to 1829, and was built in the Cossack village named Nizhne-Gnilovskaya.

In the 19th century the epidemic of cholera spread across the city, which resulted in numerous deaths. The Aksay Icon of the Mother of God – Odigitria – was considered a miraculous icon which confronted the epidemic. In 1892–1893 people built a chapel in the name of Chudotvornaya Aksay Icon of Odigitria, which was a kind of salvation and a true miracle which prevented from the horrible cholera and saved lives of folks.

During the Civil War, the members of the White movement were focused on the church, which became the centre of the White Army later on. There was an attempt to organize a rebuff to the spreading of Soviet Power. In 1918 the priest of the church, Alexei Chasovnickov, asked a group of Cossacks to gather around for discussing some important issues. They decided to resist the Red Army, the squad of Rudolf Sivers, who had to abandon Rostov, as the White Army, which was under the command of Lavr Kornilov, turned out to be larger.

In 1940 the church was destroyed, and in 17 years the citizens started to build a cinema named “Mir” (Russian: «Мир»). Although in 1991 everything was changed, and the Cossacks demanded to close it and to build a temple, and the first rector of the church was Alexiy. In 1996 the church was reconstructed upon the project of the architect Y.N. Solnyshkin.

== Church of Great Martyr and Healer Saint Panteleymon ==
Basic information

Location	Rostov region, Rostov-on-Don, Sholokhov, 29A
Affiliation	Russian Orthodox
Status	Active
Schedule of services	−8.00–19.00
Patronal feast	August, 9

Church of Great Martyr and Healer Saint Panteleymon (Russian: Храм Святого Великомученика и целителя Пантелеймона).
The church is arranged at the initiative of the organization of liquidators of the Chernobyl accident "the Union Chernobyl" and the orthodox center "Blagovest" in the tenth anniversary of the Chernobyl accident and consecrated in day of remembrance of the Saint great martyr on August 9, 1996. The building for the temple was reconstructed on the project of the architect A. Buchkin. From now the temple is equipping and reconstructing continuously with modern conveniences, taking appearance of a standard cult construction. There are hold the orthodox spiritual and educational center "Blagovest" and Sunday school works.

== The Church of all Saints ==
Basic information

Location	Rostov-on-Don, Chkalovsky, Salsky Lane, 61
Affiliation	Russian Orthodox
Status	Active
Schedule services	−8.00–18.00

The Church of all Saints (Russian: Храм Всех Святых, в земле Российской просиявших).
In 1995 the Archbishop Rostov and Novocherkassk Panteleimon has signed the Decree on creation of orthodox parish to the settlement Chkalovsky of Rostov-on-Don. Arrival at that time had no building for commission of church services yet and has legally been written down to the address of the house of one of organizers of an orthodox community in Chkalovsk the settlement.

In 2009 the building facade is painted, the roof is replaced, the temple building is repaired, the keramo-granite tile is laid.

Now the temple actively is engaged social, educational, educational and publishing.

== The temple of Saint John the Warrior ==
Basic information

Location	Rostov-on-Don, Western district, 339th Strelkovoy Divizii St., 33
Affiliation	Russian Orthodox
Status	Active
Schedule services	−7.30–19.00
Patronal Feast	August, 12

The temple of Saint John the Warrior(Russian: Храм Иоанна Воина) is a part of a spiritual and patriotic complex under construction for the sake of the great martyr Georges the Victorious. The idea of a complex belonged to the Archbishop Rostov and Novocherkassk Panteleymon and the Russian President's Plenipotentiary in the South federal district V. G. Kazantsev.

It is the first in the contemporary history wooden temple in Rostov-on-Don. The project of an iconostasis belongs to the Rostov icon painter Vladimir Makarov. The temple rather small, but, besides the room for church services, under his arches there are a belltower, a refectory and the lecture hall.

Active participation in construction of the temple of John the Warrior and his today's life is accepted by Ivan Ignatyevich Savvidi.

== Temple of the Mother of God of Tenderness ==
Basic information

Location	Rostov Region, Rostov-on-Don, Dmitrov st, 43/24а
Affiliation	Russian Orthodox
Status	Active
Schedule of services	7.30 am – 4.00 pm

Temple of the Mother of God of Tenderness (Russian: Храм в честь Иконы Божией Матери "Умиление").

The Orthodox prayer house was opened in Pervomaisk (former Stalin) area of Rostov-on-Don, during the Great Patriotic War, in honor of the icon of the Mother of God "Odigitria." In 1964, the executive local government decided to liquidate the parish. In 90-s, with the beginning of the revival of Orthodoxy in Russia, according to the numerous requests of the inhabitants, the leadership of Rostov-on-Don decided to restore the destroyed shrine. A piece of land for the construction of the new church was allotted in Sergo Ordzhonikidze Square. March 28, 1997 became the date of the official formation of the new Orthodox parish in honor of the icon of the Mother of God "Tenderness". The name of the church was adopted at the First Congregation MeetingWorship services were held in the rented premises of the production hall, and located nearby in the park during the construction of the church. The first stone for the construction of a new church was laid on March 25, 1998, with the blessing of Vladyka Panteleimon, On March 23, 2004, golden domes shone above the temple. On August 10, 2005, the first divine services began to be performed. On August 3, 2008, the great consecration of the new church in the name of the icon of the Mother of God "Tenderness" was held by the Archbishop of Rostov and Novocherkassk.

== Temple in honor of the icon of the Blessed Virgin Mary "Healer" ==
Basic information

Location	Rostov Region, Rostov-on-Don, Highway Taganrogskaya, 108
Affiliation	Russian Orthodox
Status	Active
Schedule of services	7.30 am – morning service5.00 pm – evening service

Temple in honor of the icon of the Blessed Virgin Mary "Healer" (Russian: Храм в честь иконы Пресвятой Богородицы "Целительница" ).

The parish of the Russian Orthodox Church in Voenved area was founded in 1996 – at the height of the first Chechen war. Dozens of killed servicemen and wounded daily arrived in the district military clinical hospital. The head of the hospital decided to open a chapel for the burial service of the dead and something like a temple where the wounded soldiers could pray on the territory of the medical institution. ...Approximately at the same time the administration of the Oktyabrsky district allocated a plot of land for construction of the church opposite the military market. The leadership of the North Caucasian Railway donated a railway carriage that was converted to a temple and on August 9, 1997 the first Liturgy was served.

June 25, 2012 Archpriest Vadim Tsarev died after a serious illness.

June 20, 2015 by the decree of the Head of the Don Metropolitanate, Metropolitan of Rostov and Novocherkassk Mercury, Archpriest Constantine Makarenko, rector of the church, was appointed as a dean of the North-Western District of Rostov-on-Don.
