= Iversky Monastery =

Iversky Monastery may refer to:

- Valday Iversky Monastery
- Iversky Monastery (Donetsk)
- Iversky Convent (Rostov-on-Don)
