= Church of St. John of Kronstadt, Rostov-on-Don =

Coordinates: 47.2504°N 39.6959°E

Church of St. John of Kronstadt
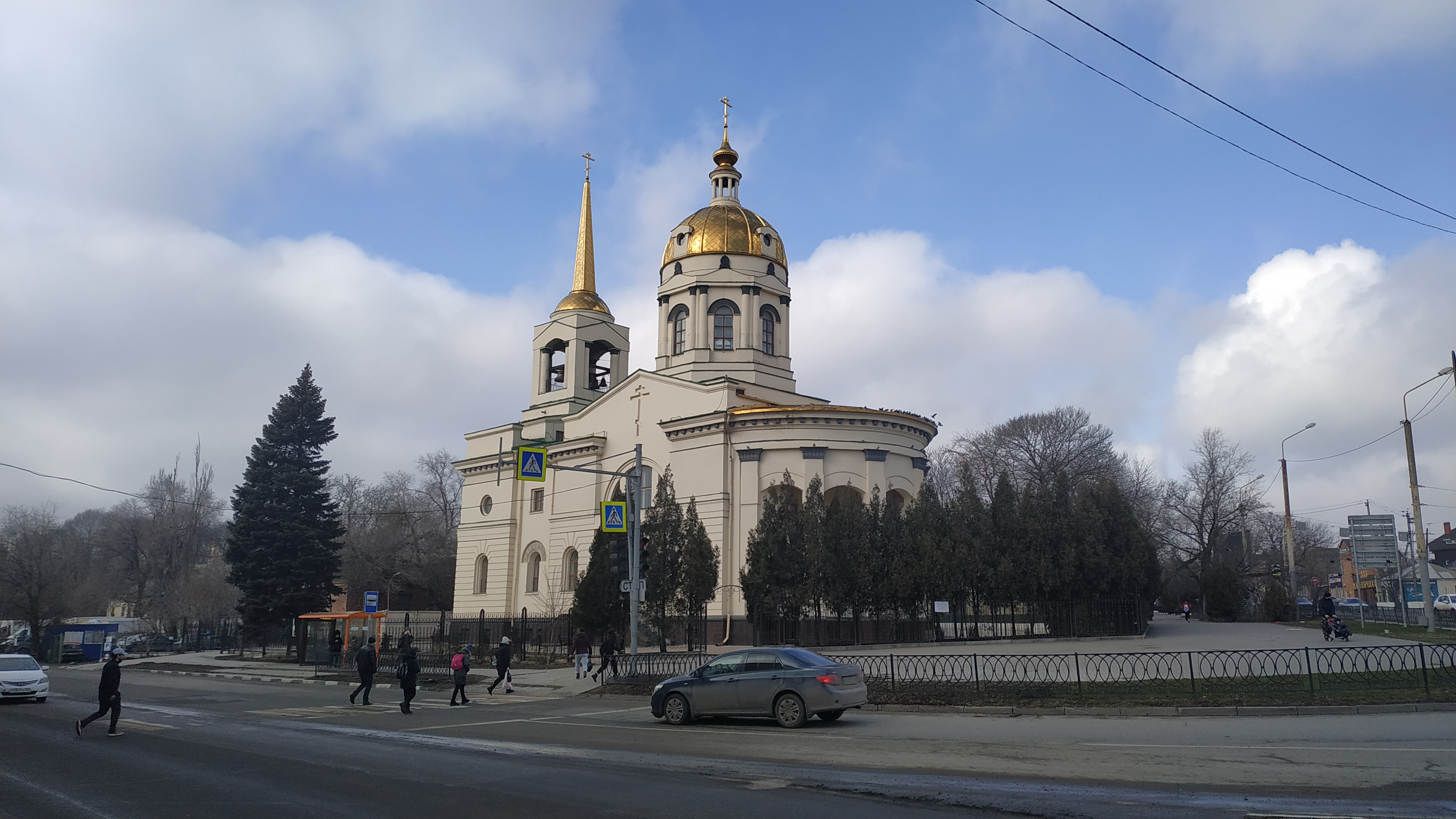

Religion
- Affiliation: Russian Orthodox

Location
- Location: Rostov-on-Don, Rostov Oblast Russia
- Interactive map of Church of St. John of Kronstadt

Architecture
- Architect: Genrikh Vasilyevich Ivanov
- Completed: 2010

Church of St. John of Kronstadt (Russian: Храм в честь святого праведного Иоанна Кронштадтского) is an Orthodox church in the city of Rostov-on-Don, Russia. It belongs to Rostov and Novocherkassk Diocese of Moscow Patriarchate. It was built in 2010 on the project of architect Genrikh Vasilyevich Ivanov.

== History ==
The church dedicated to Saint John of Kronstadt is the only church of the Rostov and Novorcherkassk Diocese that was built specially for university students.

The history of this temple began in 1992. On September 29 took place the opening of a chapel at the Rostov State Transport University. The first prayer service in the chapel was hell on September 1, 1993.

The following year, on July 12, Archbishop of Rostov and Novocherkassk Panteleimon consecrated construction site, and on July 26 construction of the church began. The first Divine Liturgy was held there on June 3, 1994. Soon it was decided to dedicate the new church in honor of St. John of Kronstadt. In 1999 Patriarch of Moscow Alexy II attended the university and consecrated the area of People's Militia's Square and the foundation stone at the construction site.

In 2004, on the dome was established a cross. From 14 March 2005, the services had been held at the sacrarium of Holy Apostles Peter and Paul, built in the basement of the church.

The church is built in Classicist style (as opposed to Neo-Byzantine, which is predominant in Rostov-on-Don).

A Sunday school is also functioning there.
