= Iversky Monastery (Donetsk) =

Ruined monastery in Ukraine

- Іверський монастир
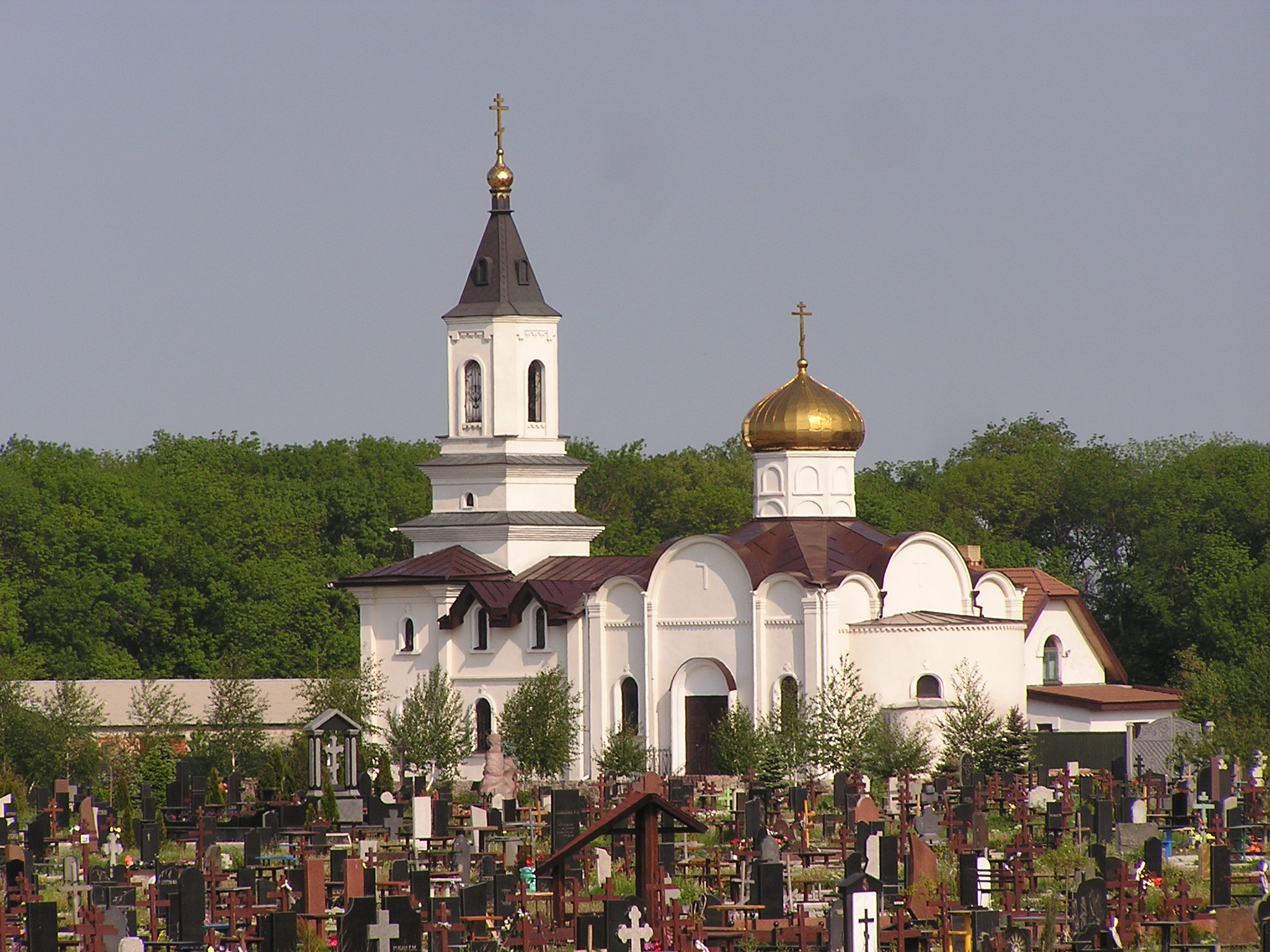
- The Iversky Monastery in 2008

Monastery information
- Order: Ukrainian Orthodox Church (Moscow Patriarchate)
- Established: December 2001
- Disestablished: 2014
- Dedicated to: Panagia Portaitissa
- Diocese: Diocese of Donetsk and Mariupol

People
- Founder(s): Hilarion (Szukało)

Architecture
- Status: Largely destroyed
- Groundbreaking: April 1997
- Completion date: 2001

Site
- Location: Donetsk, Ukraine
- Coordinates: 48°3′56″N 37°43′56.1″E

The Iversky Monastery (Ukrainian: Іверський монастир, Russian: Иверский монастырь) was a monastery of the Ukrainian Orthodox Church (Moscow Patriarchate) in Donetsk, Ukraine. It was built between 1997 and 2001, and was closed in 2014 due to the war in Donbas. The monastery was largely destroyed during the Second Battle of Donetsk Airport in January 2015.

== History ==
The first stone of the Iversky Monastery was laid down by Hilarion (Szukało) in April 1997. The monastery was built on a vacant plot in northern Donetsk, close to the airport. The monastery was opened in December 2001, and it was a subsidiary of the Monastery of St. Nicholas in Mykilske before it became independent in December 2002.

=== War in Donbas ===
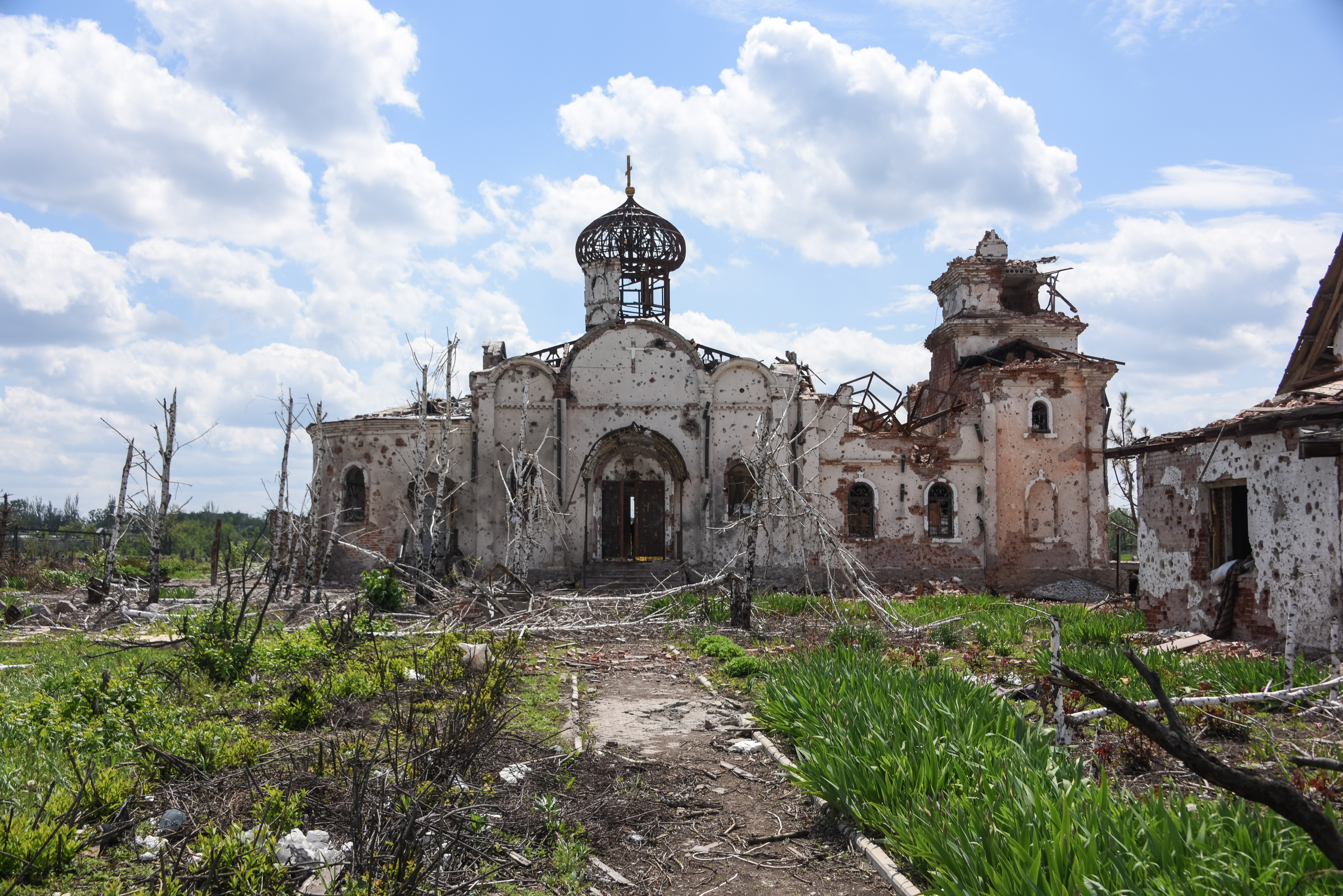
The remains of the monastery in May 2015

The monastery was severely damaged during the war in Donbas. The sisters evacuated the monastery in 2014. In January 2015, the building was destroyed during the Second Battle of Donetsk Airport. The monastery and its cemetery were almost completely destroyed in the fighting, with only a bullet-ridden shell remaining.

== Architecture ==
The monastery consisted of a church with a bell tower, a convent building housing the sisters and a number of other buildings. A cemetery, an orchard and a vegetable garden were located within the grounds of the monastery.
