= Iversky Convent (Rostov-on-Don) =

Russian Orthodox convent

Coordinates: 47.1654°N 39.4150°E

Iversky Convent Иверский женский монастырь
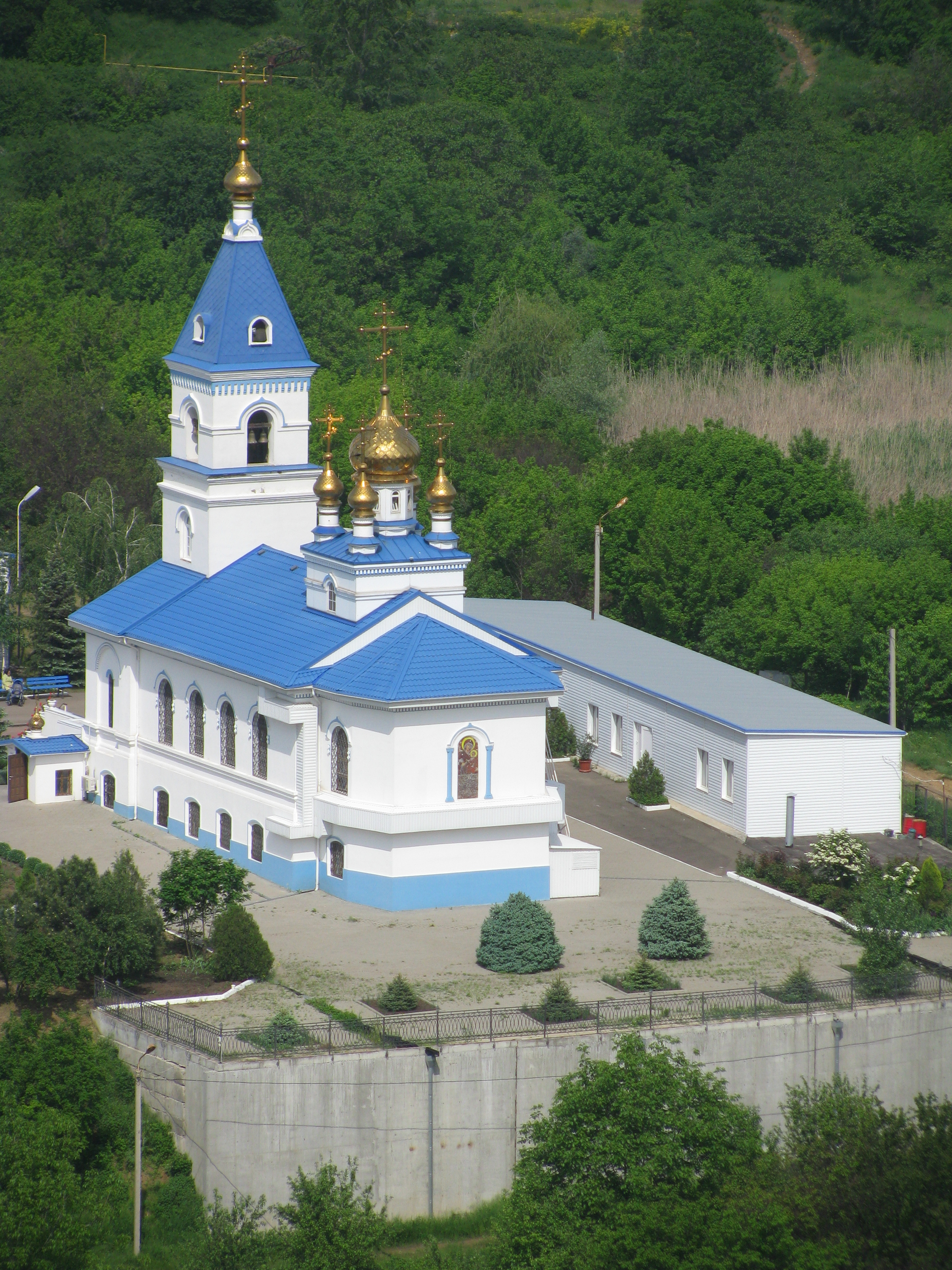
- Interactive map of Iversky Convent; Иверский женский монастырь

Monastery information
- Order: Russian Orthodox
- Established: 1908
- Diocese: Diocese of Rostov

Site
- Location: Rostov-on-Don, Rostov Oblast, Russia

The Iversky Convent (Russian: Иверский женский монастырь) is a Russian Orthodox convent in the city of Rostov-on-Don, Rostov Oblast, Russia. It belongs to the Diocese of Rostov and Novocherkassk.

== History ==
The Iversky Convent was established at the beginning of the 20th century. It was built on the fund of Rostov-on-Don merchant Samuil Fyodorov, who, according to a city legend, had a sixteen-year-old daughter who wished to become a nun. The convent was initially situated about 15 km from the city. The first Abbess of the convent was Mother Anastasia. About 50 sisters lived there back then.

The Iversky Convent was completed and consecrated in 1908. During World War I, the convent was also an orphanage for girls from Poland, who lived here until 1920-s.

In 1919, under the threat of closing the convent, the Abbess Anastasia had to declare nun community as a farming cooperative. At the convent there were poultry and cattle yard, a bakery, a kitchen, a large apiary, an orchard, artificial dams for fish breeding and a rose garden. Yet in 1929 the convent was closed, its property was expropriated and Anastasia and some of the sisters were expelled to Siberia.

The convent was revived on the decree of Holy Synod of the Russian Orthodox Church in 1991. By 2002, the convent had been renovated and in November of the same year it was reconsecrated by the Bishop of Rostov Panteleimon.

== Gallery ==
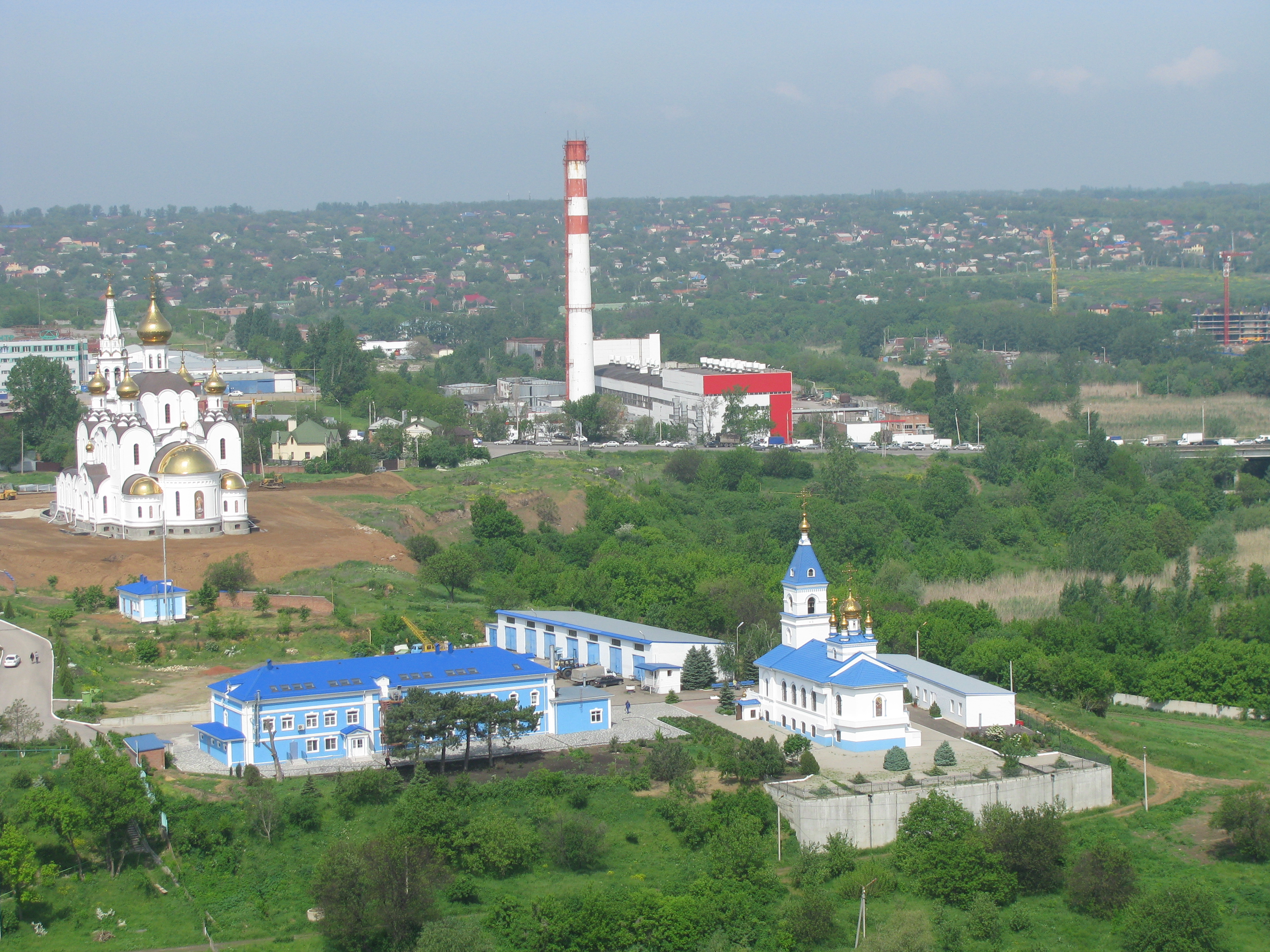

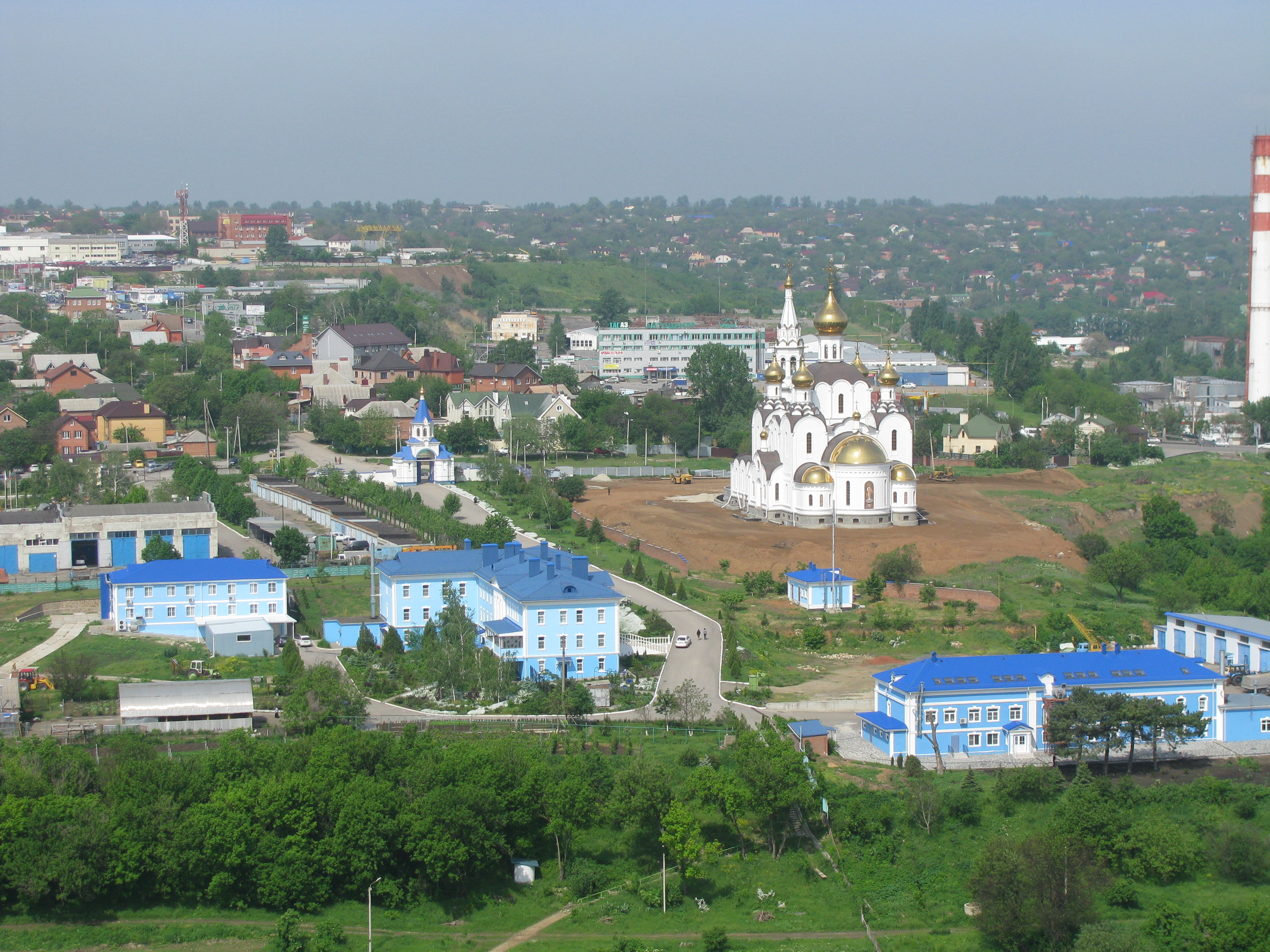

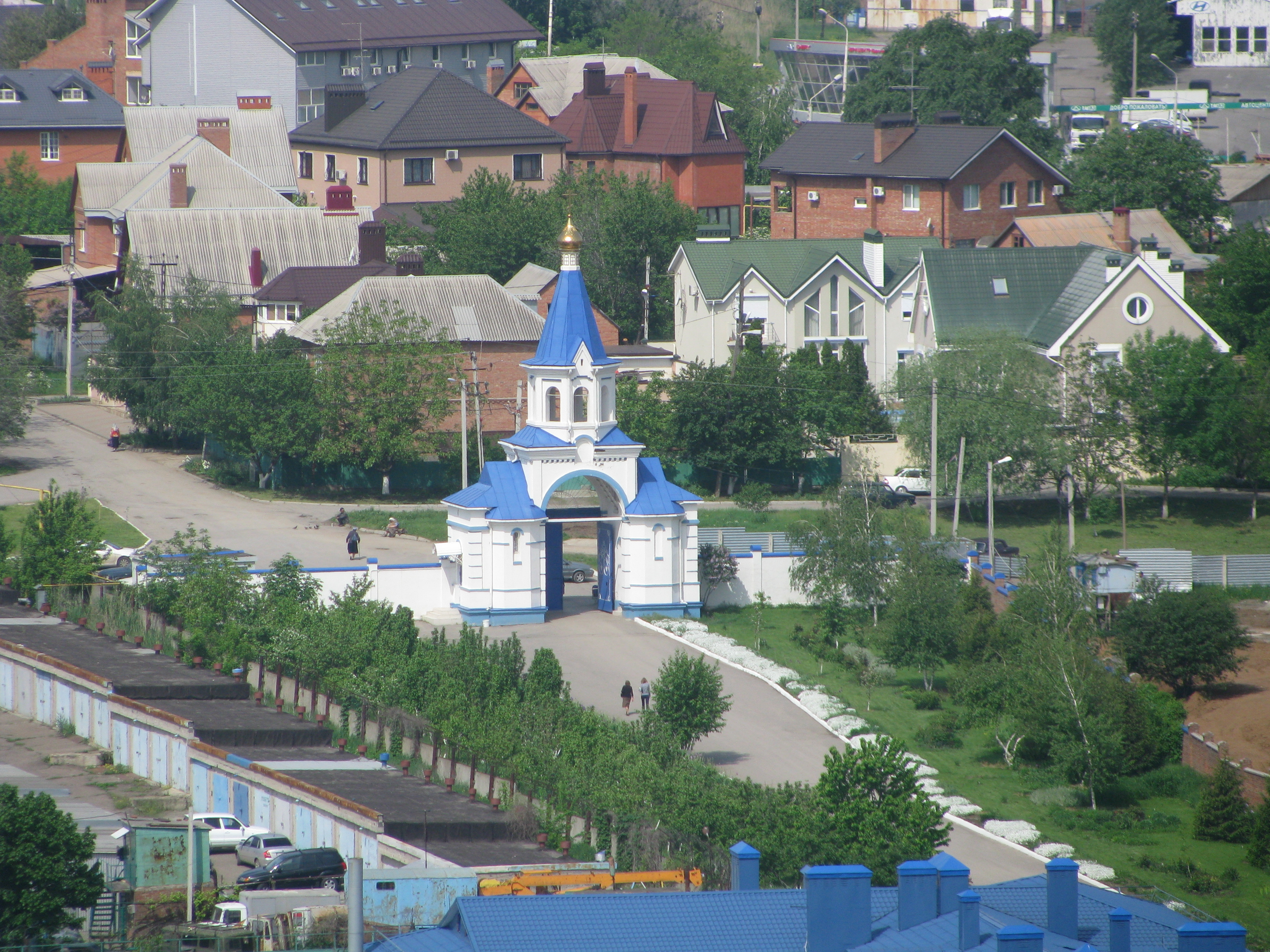

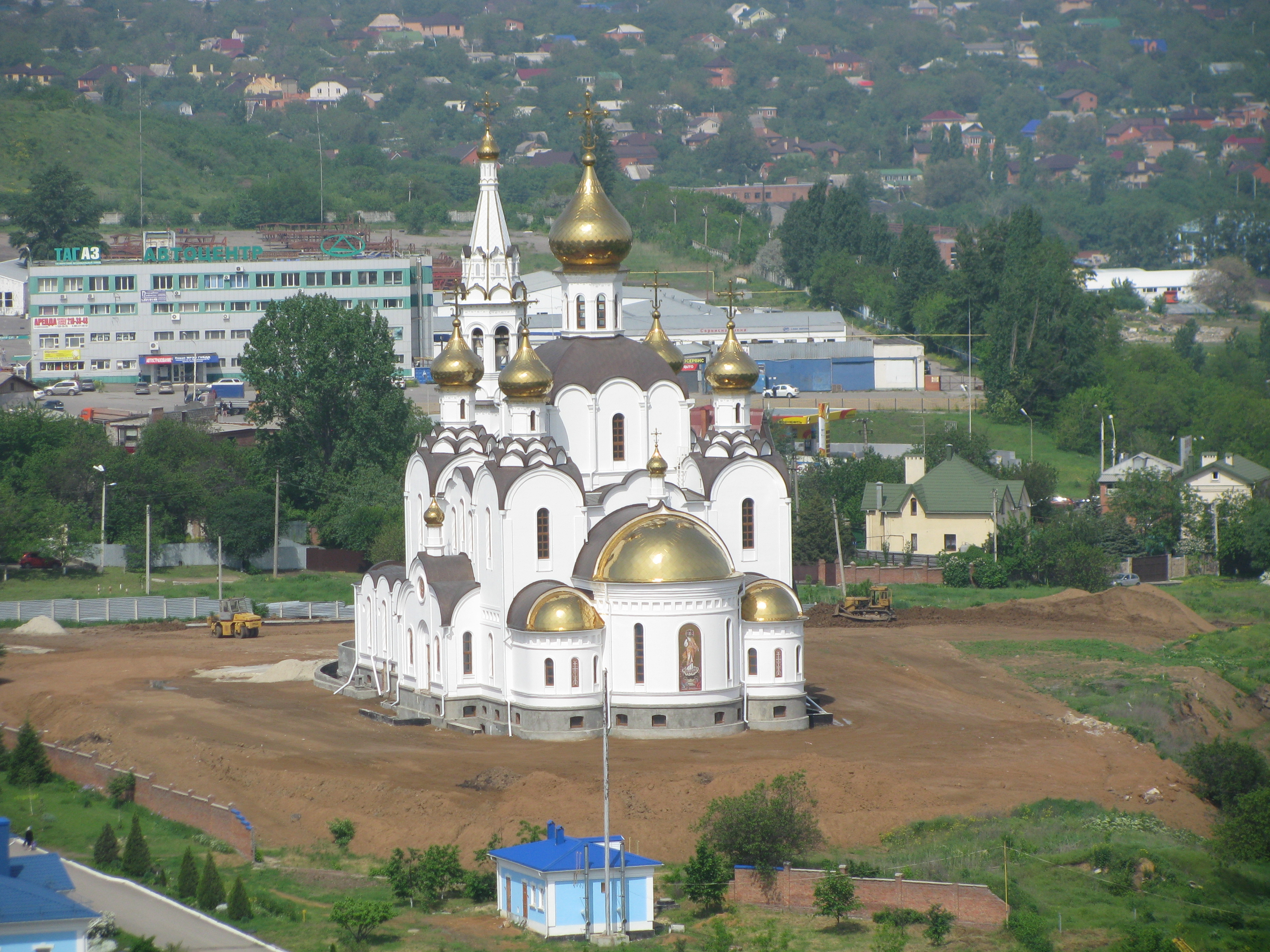

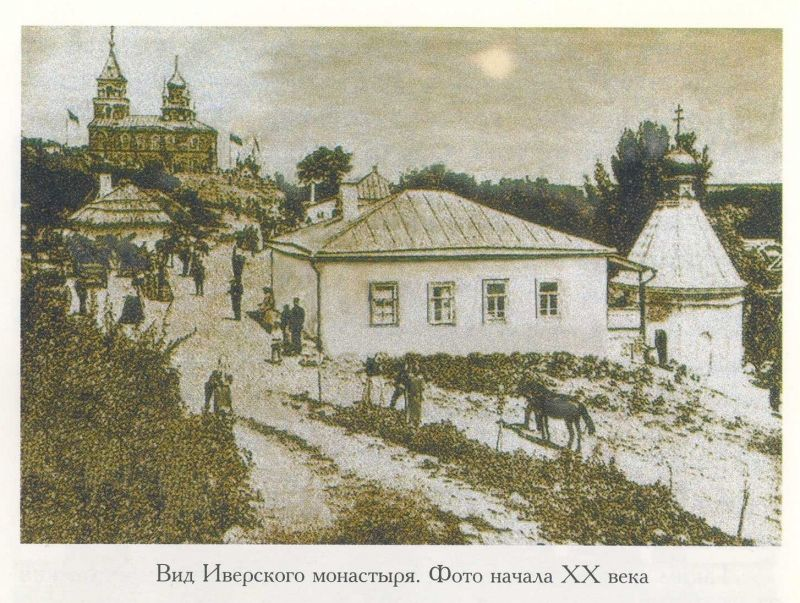
