= Tuvardzhiyev House =

- Дом Туварджиевых
- 47°13′12″N 39°42′36″E
- Location: Rostov-on-Don
- Completion date: Late nineteenth century
- Dismantled date: 2016

The Tuvardzhiyev House (Russian: Дом Туварджиевых) was a one-and-a-half-storey historical building in Rostov-on-Don. It was located at 41 Shaumyana Street. Constructed in the late nineteenth century, it was an example of a typical merchant house of this period, and was the location of the city's first billiard room. Despite efforts to secure its preservation, the house was demolished in 2016.

== History and description ==
The house was built at the end of the 19th century. The first written mention of it was found in the Assessment of Real Estate of Rostov-on-Don, published in 1894. The building was listed as No. 67 Shaumyana Street, and as being owned by Anna Aleksandrovna Ivanova. According to documents, the value of the property was estimated at 2,750 rubles. Information is recorded that that same year the Tuvardzhiyev brothers, Yegor and Stepan, became owners of the house. They were engaged in entrepreneurial activities, trading in wine, and renting shops for this purpose near the area of the Old Market.

At the beginning of the 20th century the structure became known in the city as "The house of the Tuvardzhiyev merchants with a billiard room", and this name became attached to the house in later years. In 1904 the house was valued at 5,500 rubles. In 1911 Stepan Khristoforovich and Yevgenia Dmitriyevna Tuvardzhiyev became owners of the house. They undertook the reconstruction of the house, increasing its value three times over. An attic level was built, the cellar was repurposed, and a billiards room was created. At some point between 1913 and 1914 the inscription "Billiardnaya" was placed on the facade, which survived until the house's demolition in 2016. The inscription was made in the Mishustin workshop, which was in the same area as the house, and subsequently moved to be one house away. The billiard room was closed in the 1920s. In the 20th century the house was occupied by several communal flats, and was often used as a backdrop during filming.

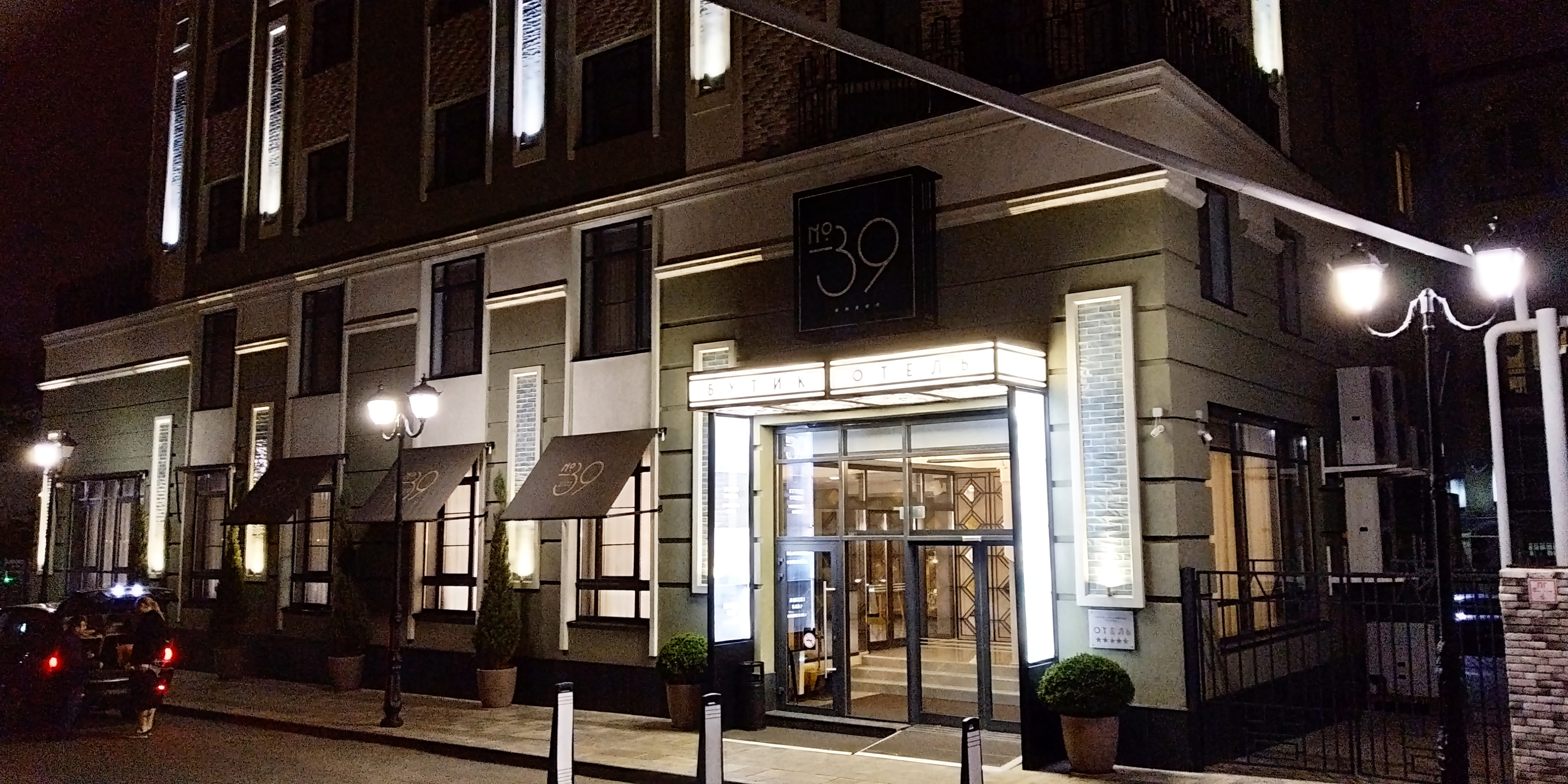
The former site of the Tuvardzhiyev House, now occupied by a hotel

In 2015 plans to demolish the house were revealed. The Rostov brance of the All-Russian Union of Protection of Monuments joined the attempts to preserve the building. Its representatives provided the necessary information and documents to the Ministry of Culture with a request to grant the building protected status and to recognize the Tuvardzhiyev House as an object of public value. The issue was resolved in February 2016, when the request to list the structure as an object of cultural heritage was refused. The Tuvardzhiyev House was demolished in late April 2016. A multistorey hotel was built on its site.

The house was an example of a typical development of the late 19th century, located in the city's historic centre.
