= Monument to Dimitry of Rostov =

Coordinates: 47.2178°N 39.7117°E

- Памятник Димитрию Ростовскому
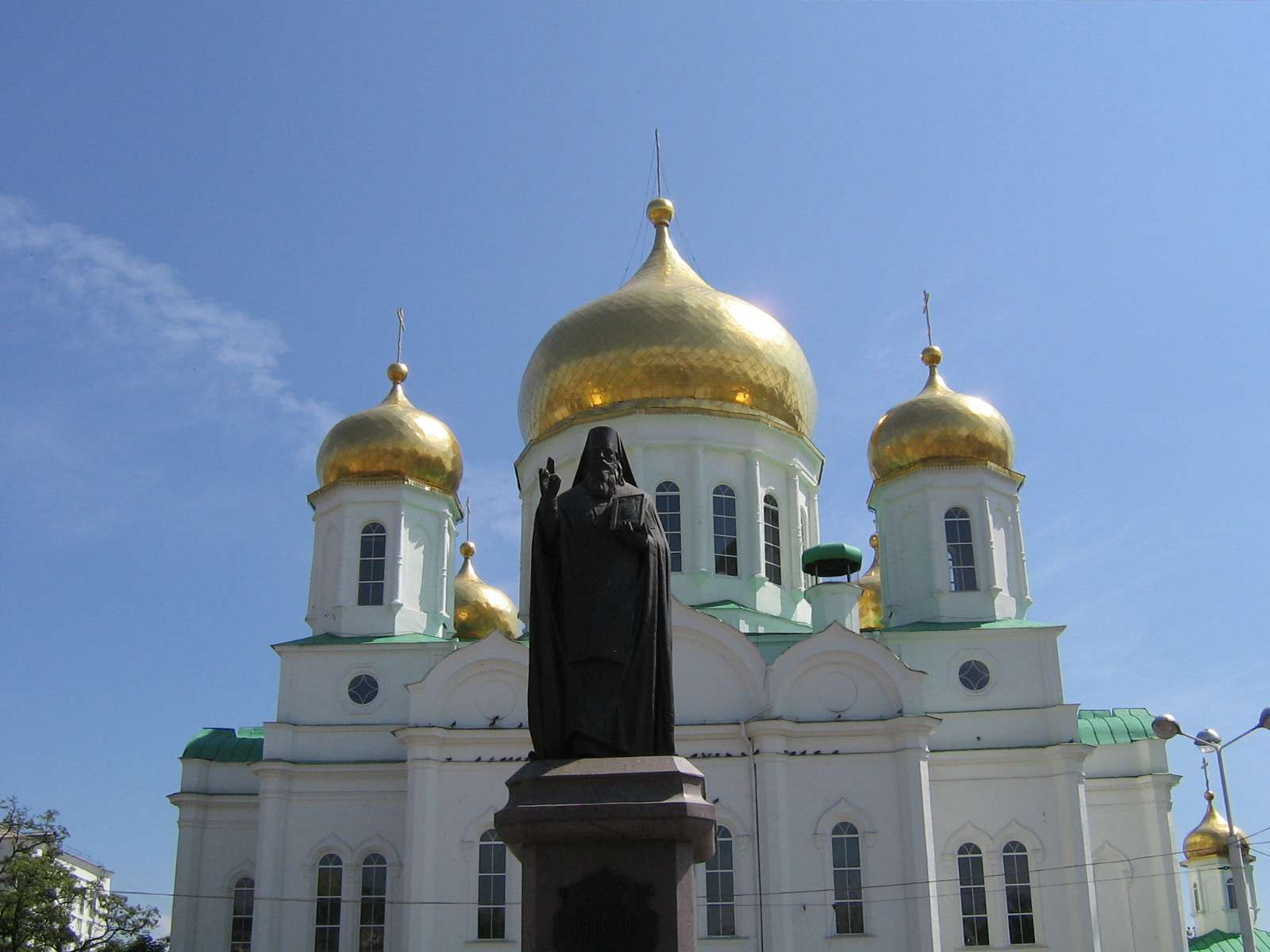
- Interactive map of Monument to Dimitry of Rostov
- Location: Sobornaya Square, Rostov-on-Don, Rostov Oblast, Russia
- Material: granite
- Opening date: 1999
- Dedicated to: Dimitry of Rostov

Monument to Dimitry of Rostov (Russian: Памятник Димитрию Ростовскому) ― is a statuary monument constructed in 1999. It is situated at the Cathedral Square in the city of Rostov-on-Don, Russia.

== History ==
The monument to the bishop of the Russian Orthodox Church and Metropolitan of Rostov and Yaroslavl Diocese Dimitry of Rostov was installed in front of the Cathedral of the Nativity of the Blessed Virgin Mary, which belongs to the Diocese of Rostov and Novocherkassk. Its grand opening was held on December 15, 1999 and was timed to the 250th anniversary of city's founding. The monument has caused mixed assessments from city residents and professional sculptors: it has been criticized for the low artistic level and inappropriate location.

The author of the original idea of the monument, who also drafted several projects on it was Don sculptor Anatoly Sknarin. Back in 1989, he received the approval from the Ministry of Culture. Later, however, the city government decided to hold an open competition of works, which was won by another sculptor, Vladimir Belyakov. In 1996, the construction works began.

In 2013 there was an active discussion about whether the monument should be turned the way it would face the cathedral, as well as whether it should be placed closer to the public square situated nearby.
