= Cathedral of the Intercession (Shakhty) =

Church in Rostov Oblast, Russia

- Собор Покрова Пресвятой Богородицы
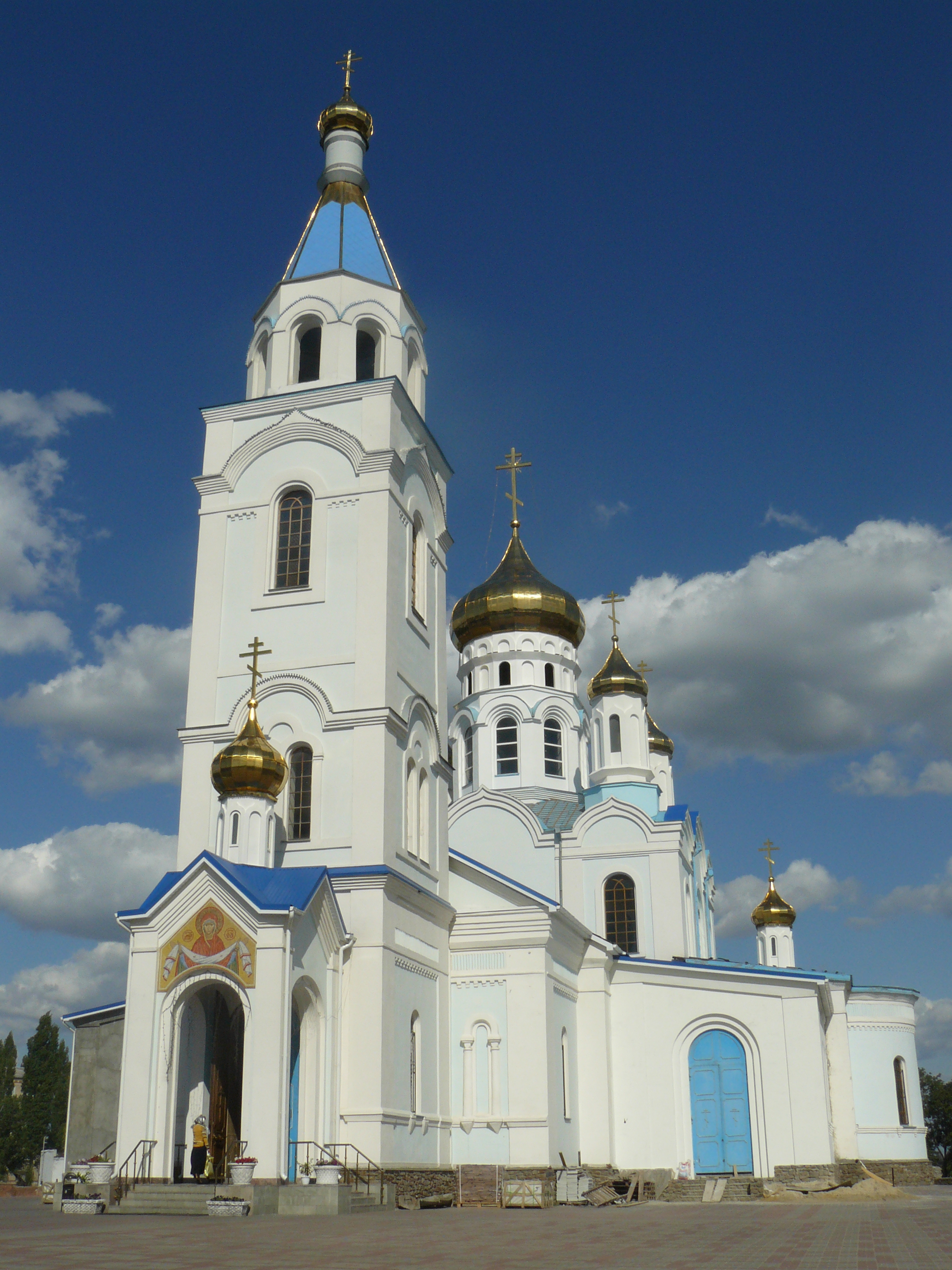
- The Church of the Intercession at the beginning of the 20th century
- Cathedral of the Intercession
- 47.7°N 40.23°E
- Location: Shakhty, Rostov-on-Don, Russia
- Country: Russia
- Denomination: Russian Orthodox

History
- Status: Cathedral

Architecture
- Completed: 1902

Administration
- Diocese: Diocese of Shakhty and Millerovo

The Cathedral of the Intercession of the Holy Virgin (Russian: Собор Покрова Пресвятой Богородицы) is a Russian Orthodox cathedral in Shakhty, Rostov Oblast, Russia, that belongs to the Diocese of Shakhty and Millerovo and was built in 1902.

== History ==
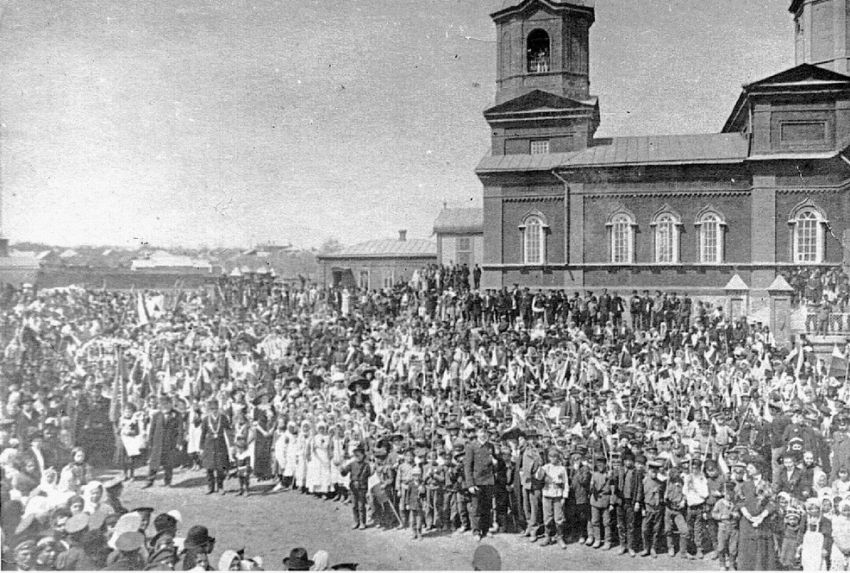
Cathedral of the Intercession

The Cathedral of the Intercession of the Holy Virgin in Alexandrovsk-Grushevsky town (present-day Shakhty) was built in 1902 in Eclecticist style. According to 1909 data, the cathedral had about 4,000 parishioners, a parochial school with 100 students, and a library.

In 1922, all of the cathedral property was nationalized. The temple was closed a year later along with two other churches in the town. In February 1933, the bells of cathedral were sent to the remelting, the dome of and bell tower were destroyed. The cathedral building had been used as a repair shop for tram depot until late 1990s.

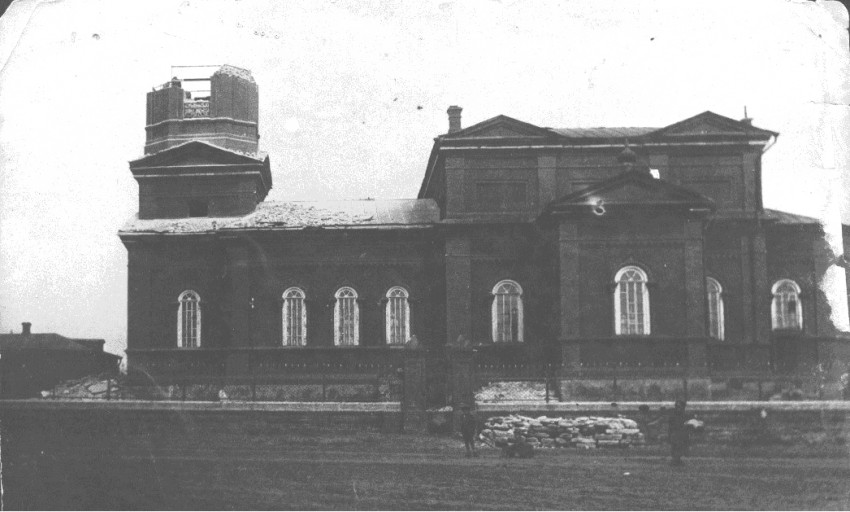
Cathedral of the Intercession in 1912

In 1997, tram depot was visited by Bishop of Rostov and Novocherkassk Panteleimon, who gave his blessing to revive the cathedral. Reconstruction works began in the fall of 1998. No old drafts of the cathedral has been preserved, so the builders had to rely on photos taken in 1912. The construction of the revived cathedral underwent substantial changes: a 33-meter high bell tower and two aisles were attached to the building.
