= Sobornaya Square (Rostov-on-Don) =

Square in Rostov-on-Don, Russia

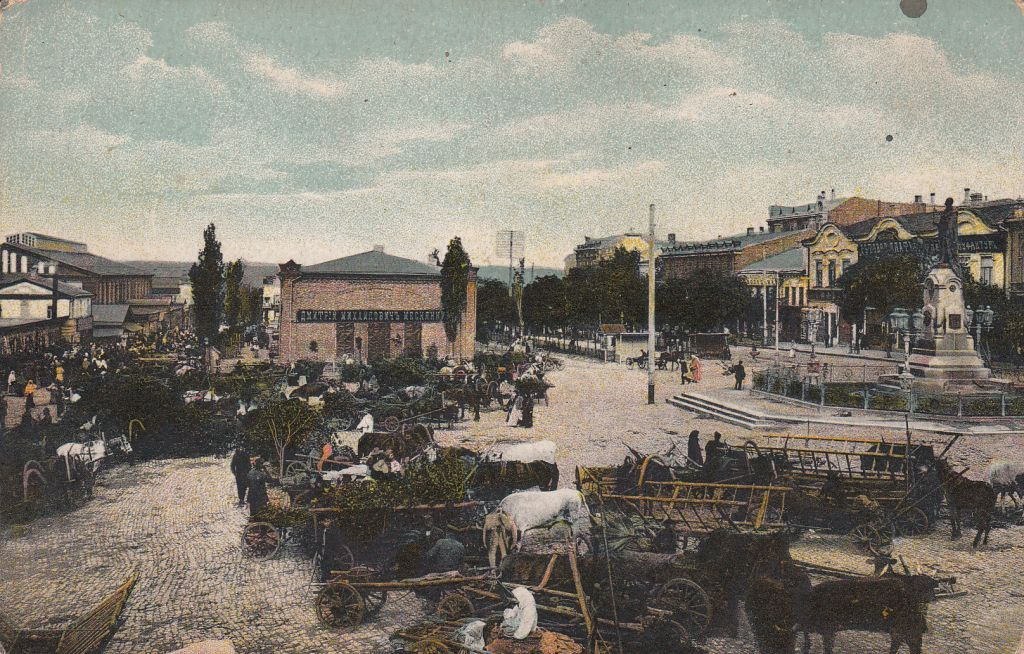
- Sobornaya Square before October Revolution
- Interactive map of Sobornaya Square
- Namesake: Rostov Cathedral
- Location: Rostov-on-Don, Russia
- Coordinates: 47.1303°N 39.4238°E

Sobornaya Square or Cathedral Square (Russian: Соборная площадь) — is a city square in Leninsky District of Rostov-on-Don, Russia.

== History ==
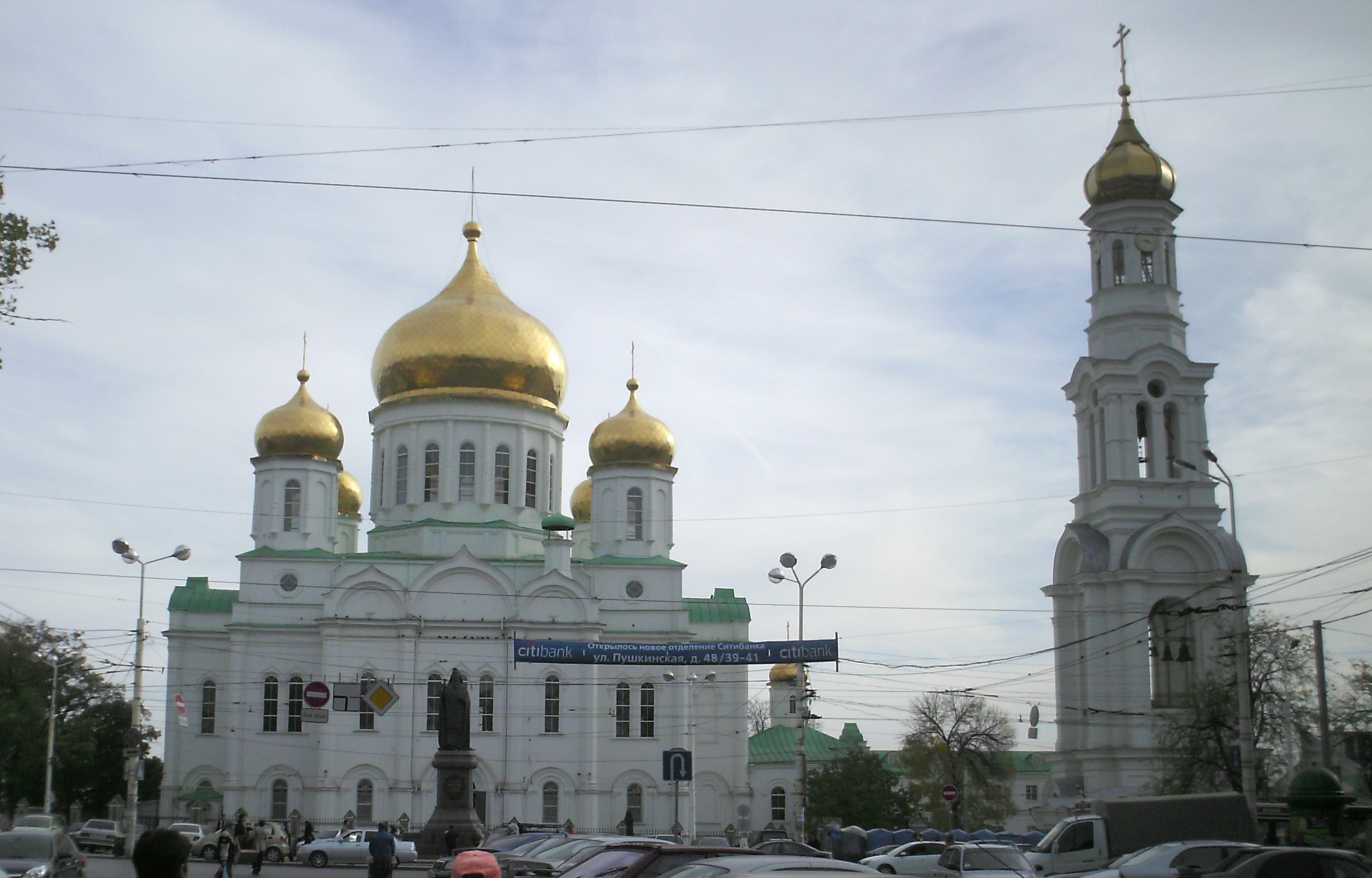
The square in 2008

At the end of the 18th century, the Soldier settlement (Soldatskya sloboda) of Rostov-on-Don began to get massively populated. It resulted in the emergence of a local city square, where a market was organized. In February 1781, the construction of a wooden church of the Nativity of the Blessed Virgin Mary, near the site of the square was started. The church was consecrated in September of the same year, yet, however, it burnt down when a lightning stroke it ten years later. In 1860, instead of wooden church, a stone one in the name of Nativity of the Blessed Virgin was built, and it still stands. In 1887 there was built a bell tower, the upper part of which was dismantled during World War II so it could not be used as a mark for shelling.

Before the cathedral, between Moskovskaya and Stanislavskogo streets, Sobornaya Square was located. In April 1890, there was erected a bronze monument to Alexander II there. In 1920, the monument was put under a plywood box with a red star, and in 1924 it was demolished. In 1999, about the site of the demolished monument to the Emperor, a monument to St. Dimitry of Rostov was opened in the days of celebrations dedicated to the 250th anniversary of Rostov-on-Don. In the same year, the bell tower of the church was finally rebuilt.

On April 14, 2012, on Holy Saturday, for the first time in history of the square a joint charity event of Rostov Cathedral and city dairy company "Polyarniy Medved" — timed to the day of Easter, the company produced the Tsar kulich. It had the weight of about half a ton, and a height of almost one meter. At the end of the Easter service it was divided and distributed among parishioners.

The tradition of making a grand kulich continued in 2014 and 2016, when the 500 kg pudding, baked in Rostov-on-Don, was delivered, respectively, to Sevastopol and Simferopol.

== See also ==
- Cathedral of the Nativity of the Blessed Virgin Mary, Rostov-on-Don
- Monument to Alexander II, Rostov-on-Don
