= Central Market (Rostov-on-Don) =

Market in Rostov-on-Don, Russia

Coordinates: 47°13′00″N 39°42′39″E

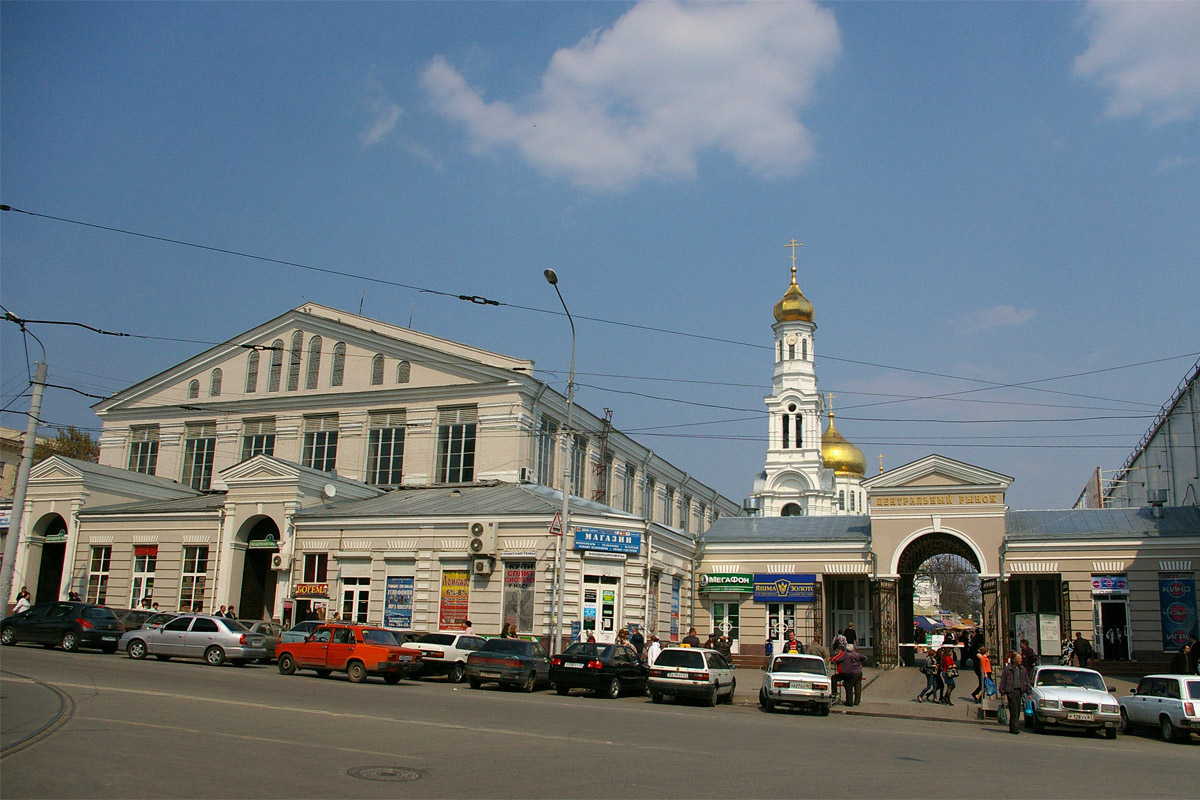
The entrance to the Central Market from Budyonnovsky Prospect

The Central Market (Russian: Центральный рынок; also known as the Old Bazaar (Russian: Старый базар) is a city market and trade enterprise in Rostov-on-Don. It is unofficially known as «Starbaz» (Russian: «Старбаз». Its official name during the Soviet period was the "Andreyevsky District Market". It is currently officially known as "CJSC «Central market» of Rostov-on-Don".

== Geography ==
The market is situated in the city's Leninsky District district. It is bordered by Semashko Lane to the east, Turgenevskaya Street to the south, Budyonnovsky Prospect to the west and Stanislavsky Street to the north.

== Occupants ==
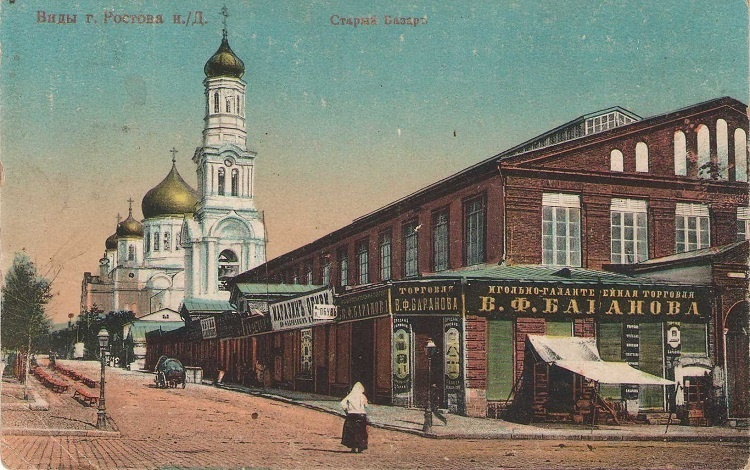
A view of the market halls in 1906, with the Cathedral of the Nativity of the Blessed Virgin Mary in the background

The market occupies a rectangle of land which includes Rostov-on-Don's branch of the Russian State University of Trade and Economy, the metochion of the Cathedral of the Nativity of the Blessed Virgin Mary and a Soviet-built two-storey house. The latter had been a shop, and is an object of architectural and cultural heritage, built in the classical style. The Maksimov House, the home of grain merchant P. R. Maksimov, also occupies the site. It was built in the first half of the 19th century, to the design of architect Trofim Sharzhinsky. It was one of the city's first stone buildings.

== History ==
The market in Rostov-on-Don is first mentioned in historical documents from the 1840s.

In 1820 a wooden Gostiny dvor was built on the site to the design of Trofim Sharzhinsky, marking the beginning of the architectural ensemble of the Central Market. It became known as the Old Bazaar after the construction of the New Bazaar, which specialized in non-food products, in 1840. The New Bazaar was completely destroyed by fire in 1905 during Anti-Jewish pogroms. It reopened in 1906, possibly in a different location than its previous site, but this has not been recorded.

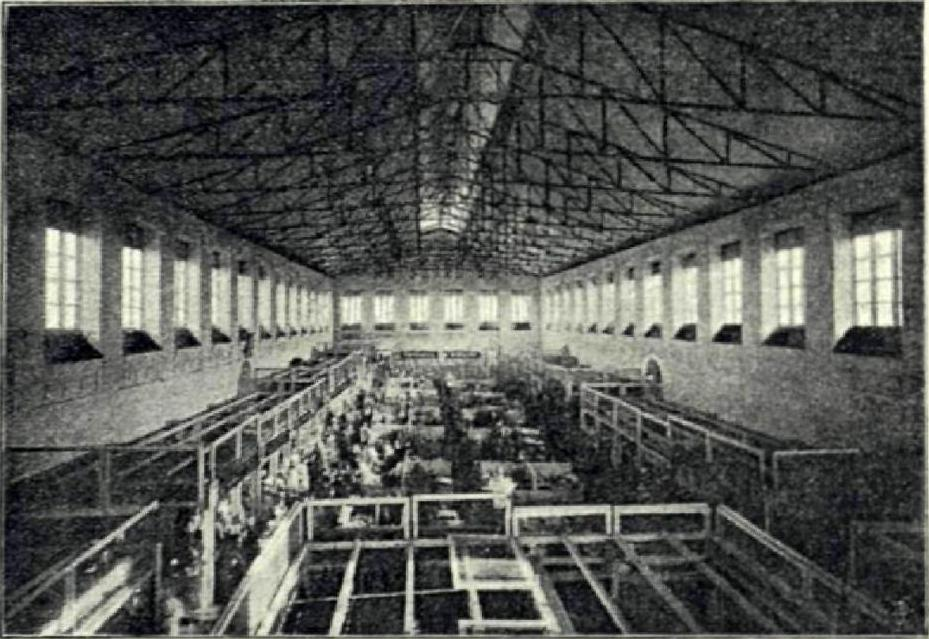
An interior view of the market hall shortly after completion

Only the third hall is extant. It bears name of "Commodity hall №1 of CSJC «Central market»" (Russian: Вещевой рынок №1 ЗАО "Центральный рынок"). The other two indoor halls and the bell tower were destroyed during the Great Patriotic War by German bombers. In the 1960s a meat hall was built over the ruins. After being reconstructed between 1989 and 1990 it became a landmark.
