= Maksimov House =

Building in Rostov-on-Don, Russia

- Дом Максимова
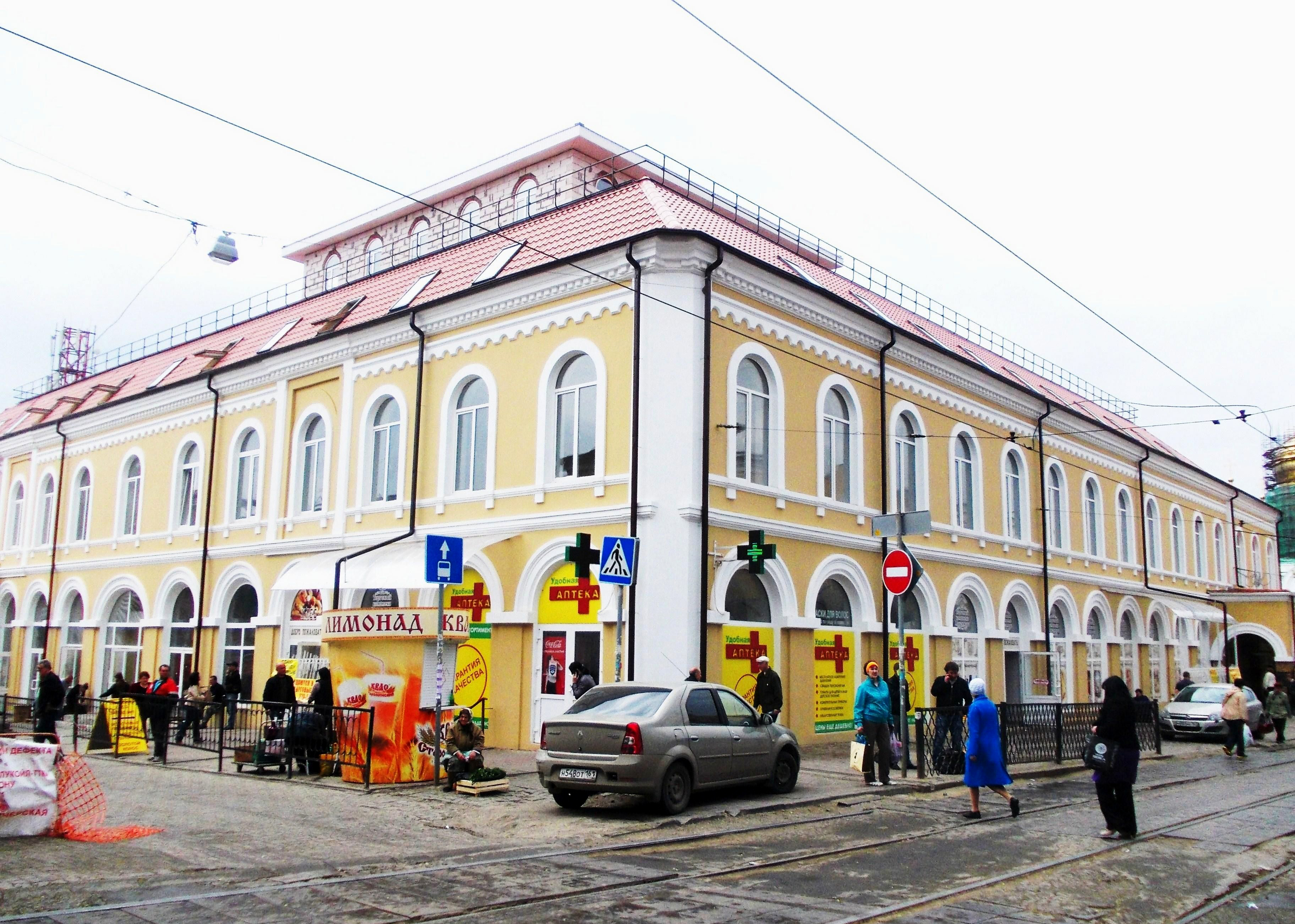
- Interactive map of Maksimov House
- Location: 60, Stanislavsky Street, Rostov-on-Don
- Coordinates: 47°13′04″N 39°42′51″E
- Beginning date: 1867
- Completion date: 1867

The Maksimov House (Russian: Дом Максимова) is a building in Rostov-on-Don, Russia, built in the middle of the 19th century in the neoclassical style. It is one of the oldest surviving stone buildings in the city. The first owner of the house was the merchant P. R. Maksimov. The Maksimov House has the status of an object of cultural heritage of regional significance.

== History and description ==
The house was built in 1867 on Rostov-on-Don's Staraya (Bazarnoy) Square, as a two-storeyed stone revenue house. It belonged to a grain dealer P. R. Maksimov, who owned granaries and mills. In 1868 a set of public spaces was opened, and the city council, merchant and bourgeois administrations moved into them.

In addition to the City Duma, the building also housed other institutions at different times: M. L. Levkova's women's school, the office of the head merchant, a factory training school, a sports school, and design institutes. There were also many merchant shops in the house.

In the 2000s (decade) the building passed through several owners, and housed various shops and offices. During the same period disputes on the security status of the house began. In April 2006, the Leninsky District Court of Rostov-on-Don stripped the house of its status as a cultural heritage site. The prosecutor's office tried to appeal this decision. The Maksimov House has undergone reconstruction and redevelopment. In 2006, a memorial plaque was installed on the building, but in 2011, during the renovation of the facade, it was removed. Later, a new board was installed.

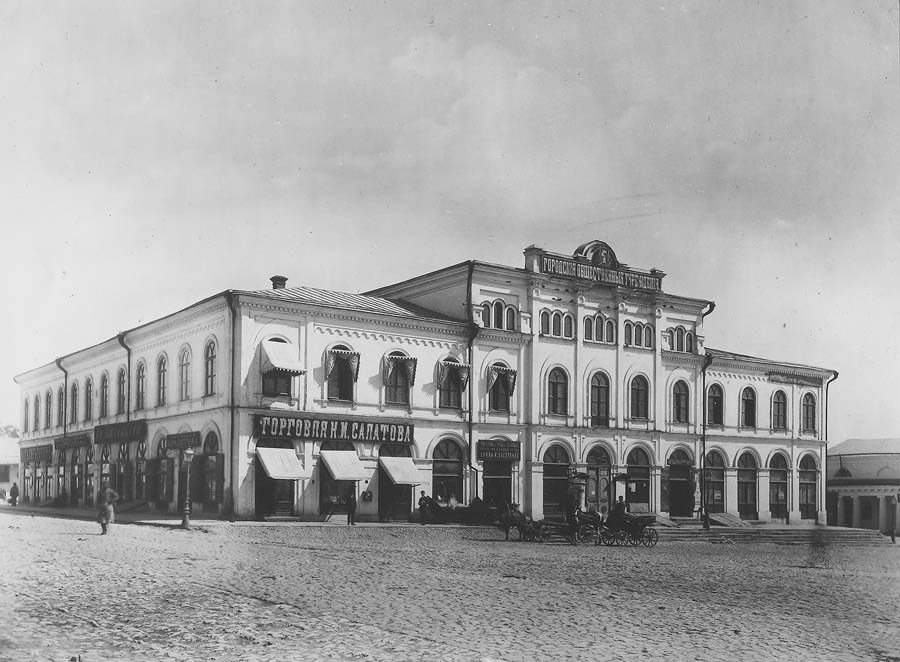
The Maksimov House as it appeared in the late nineteenth century

The building is located at the intersection of Stanislavsky Street and Semashko Lane. The main facade faces the Cathedral of the Nativity of the Theotokos. The building is built in traditions of late classicism. The window openings of the ground and second floor have semi-circular ends. A cornice with an arcature belt completes the decor of the facades. The central part of the main facade is highlighted by a mezzanine with a number of small arch windows.
