= Diocese of Rostov =

Diocese of Tver
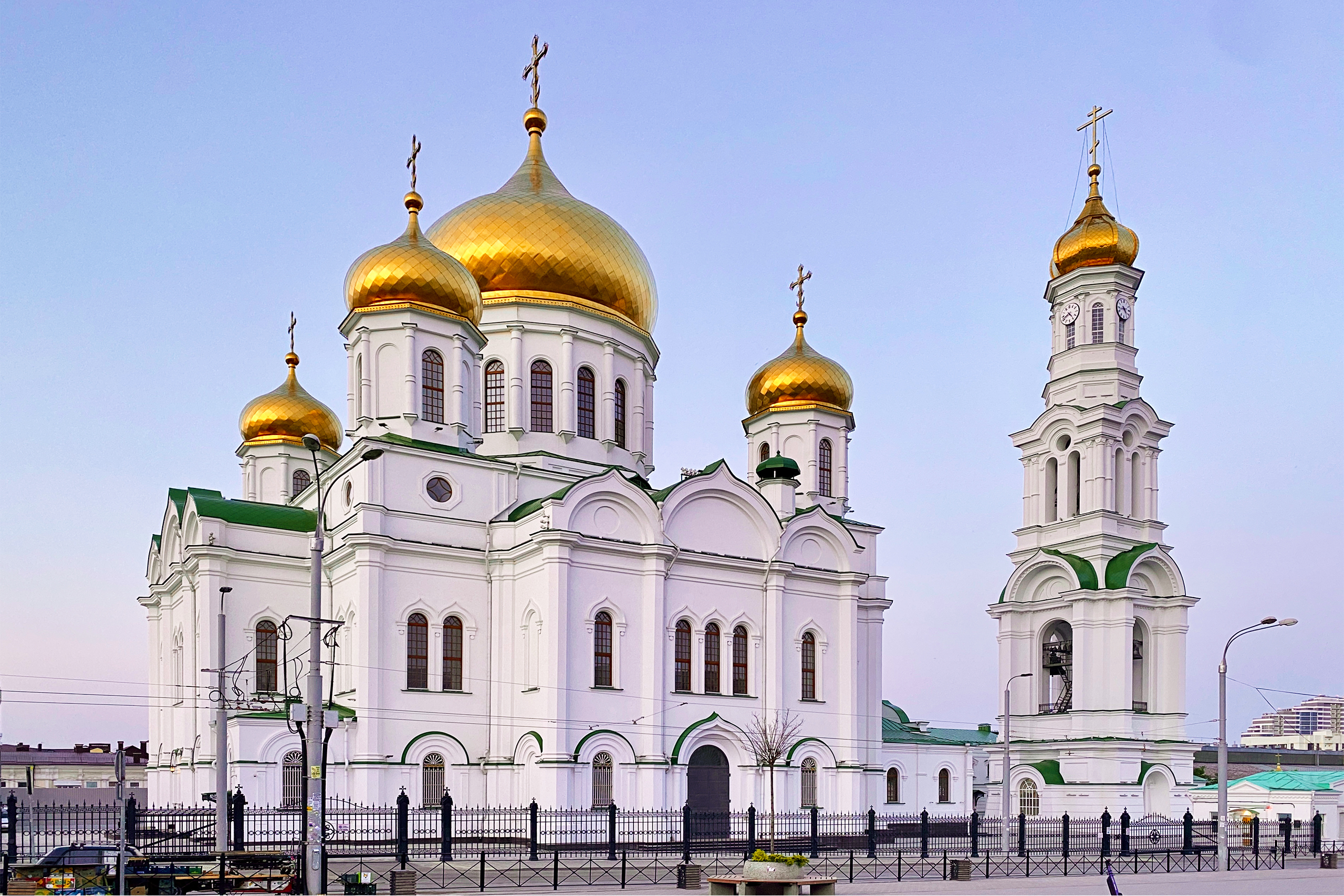
- Rostov-on-Don Cathedral

Location
- Deaneries: 17
- Headquarters: Rostov-on-Don

Information
- Denomination: Eastern Orthodox
- Sui iuris church: Russian Orthodox Church
- Established: 24 May 1919
- Cathedral: Rostov-on-Don Cathedral
- Language: Church Slavonic

Current leadership
- Governance: Eparchy
- Bishop: Mercurius (Ivanov) since 27 July 2011

Website
- rostoveparhia.ru

The Diocese of Rostov and Novocherkassk (Russian: Ростовская и Новочеркасская епархия) is an eparchy of the Russian Orthodox Church. It is a part of the Don Archdiocese, founded in 2011 and consists of various parishes and monasteries in Southwestern Rostov Oblast.

== History ==
Although the diocese's roots extend to the 13th century with the formation of the Ramsar eparchy, its official history began on April 5, 1829, when Emperor Nicholas I established the "Don and the Caucasus" eparchy. The territory of this new eparchy included the Black Sea and the Caucasus region. Its bishops were granted the titles of Novocherkassk and St. George. In 1842, with the establishment of a separate Diocese of the Caucasus, the bishops at Novocherkassk received the titles of Don and Novocherkassk.

Clergy proposed the creation of a Rostov and Taganrog district as an independent department in the center of Rostov-on-Don. In response to this proposal, the Ekaterinoslavskogo-Don Bishopric clergy sent a petition to the Holy Synod to "open Vikariystvo at Don arch-priest." The Synod did not approve this application.

During the Russian Civil War, the Stavropol Council (convened May 19–24, 1919), called for the temporary administration of Orthodox sites located in territory occupied by General Denikin's troops. On May 24, the council established the Diocese of Rostov and Taganrog, per approval of the Provisional Supreme Church Authority of Southeast Russia. This diocese was separated from the Katerynoslavs'ka diocese.

In the early 1920s, after the establishment of the Don Diocese, Soviet authorities began a systematic crackdown on the Orthodox Church. A commission was established to enforce the Decree "On the separation of church and state and school and church." This group's activities focused on closing holy sites. By 1923, seven churches were closed in Rostov alone.

In the 1930s mass church closures continued, as well as the destruction and desecration of places of worship. In 1937, Rostov Cathedral was closed. It reopened during the Nazi occupation of 1942, and remains active. The Rostov Diocese resumed full operations in 1943. It then included the territory of the former Don Diocese.

On July 27, 2011 the Diocese of Rostov, Shakhty and Volgodonsk was formed. On October 6, 2011, the diocese was incorporated into the newly formed Don Metropolis.

== Bishops ==
=== Rostov and Taganrog (1919-1948) ===
- Arsenius (Smolenets) (May 24, 1919 - November 1, 1927)
- Seraphim (Silichev) (October 27, 1927 - November 17, 1931)
- Alexander (Bialozor) (1931-1932)
- Nicholas (Amasiysky) (November 22, 1933 - 1935)
- Dionysius (Prozorovsky) (January - end of 1936)
- Nicholas (Amasiysky) (1942) v/u
- Eleutherius (Vorontsov) (August 10, 1943 - April 5, 1946)
- Seraphim (Sharapov) (April 14, 1946 - October 30, 1947)
- Sergius (Larin) (October 30, 1947 - October 19, 1949)

Rostov and Novocherkassk (February 24, 1948 - 1954)

- Nicholas (Chufarovsky) (October 19, 1949 - March 23, 1951)
- Benjamin (Fedchenkov) (March 23, 1951 - November 28, 1955)

=== Rostov and Kamensky (1954-1957) ===
- Flavian (Ivanov) (November 28, 1955 - October 7, 1958)

=== Rostov and Novocherkassk (since 1957) ===
- Innocent (Zelnitsky) (December 8, 1958 - March 16, 1961)
- Nicander (Viktorov) (March 16 - August 16, 1961)
- Sergius (Petrov) (August 1961 - January 12, 1962) v/u, Bishop of Voronezh
- Jerome (Zakharov) (January 12, 1962 - December 14, 1966)
- Alexius (Konoplyov) (December 15, 1966 - October 7, 1967) v/u, Archbishop of Krasnodar
- Hilarion (Prokhorov) (October 7, 1967 - December 16, 1969)
- Nicholas (Kutepov) (December 16, 1969 - December 1, 1970)
- Vladimir (Kotlyarov) (December 1, 1970 - May 31, 1973)
- Joasaph (Ovsyannikov) (May 31, 1973 - April 2, 1982)
- Vladimir (Sabodan) (July 16, 1982 - May 27, 1992)
- Vladimir (Kotlyarov) (again, February 23, 1993 - December 27, 1995)
- Panteleimon (Dolganov) (December 27, 1995 - July 27, 2011)
- Mercurius (Ivanov) (since July 27, 2011)

== See also ==
- Russian Orthodox Church
- Eparchies and Metropolitanates of the Russian Orthodox Church
