= Rostov-on-Don Cathedral =

Cathedral in Rostov-on-Don, Russia

Coordinates: 47.2172°N 39.7115°E

Cathedral of the Nativity of the Blessed Virgin Mary
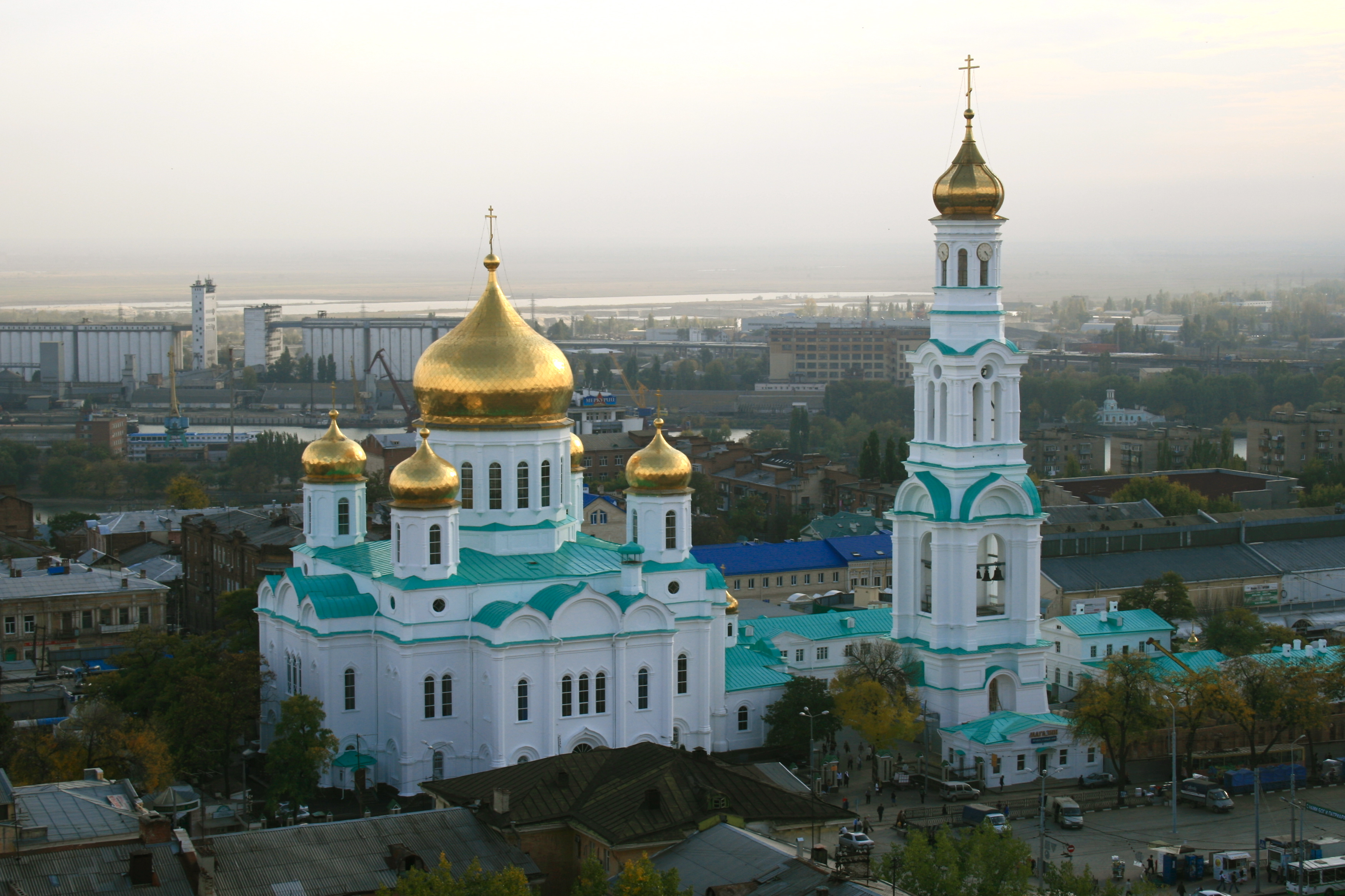

Religion
- Affiliation: Russian Orthodox

Location
- Location: Rostov-on-Don, Russia
- Interactive map of Cathedral of the Nativity of the Blessed Virgin Mary

Architecture
- Architect: Konstantin Ton
- Completed: 1860

The Cathedral of the Nativity of the Theotokos (Russian: Кафедральный собор во имя Рождества Пресвятой Богородицы) is the main church of the city of Rostov-on-Don and the Orthodox Diocese of Rostov and Novocherkassk.

== Background ==
At the end of the 18th century, after a large-scale resettlement to suburbs of soldiers, burghers and merchants, the city authorities decided to build a temple dedicated to the Navity of the Theotokos. The church was founded on February 20, 1781, and opened on September 5, 1781. However, only ten years after, on December 27, 1791, a lightning strike burned the temple.

The then mayor of the city―M. Naumov, a merchant―petitioned to Metropolitan Gavriil, who was the head of Ekaterinoslav Diocese and supervised the territory of Rostov on the construction of the new church. In 1795 at the same place began the construction works of the Church of the Nativity of the Blessed Virgin. In 1822 the church received cathedral status on decree of the Holy Synod.

== History ==
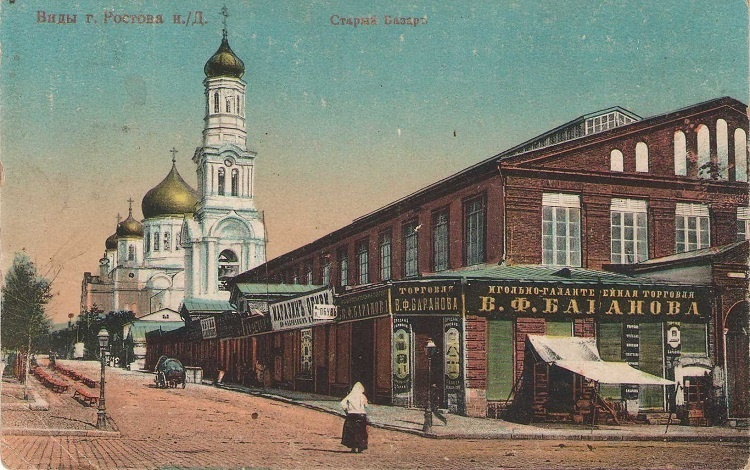
A vintage postcard

In the mid-19th century, the population of Rostov was growing steadily. As a result, Emperor Nicholas I approved the draft for a new stone church to replace the old masonry temple with wooden domes that could no longer contain the crowds of worshippers.

The cathedral was built between 1854 and 1860 to Konstantin Ton's generic, or model design.

In 1937 the cathedral was closed, and on its territory was opened a zoo, and the cathedral itself was used as warehouse. In the 1940s the upper tiers of the bell tower were destroyed.

The cathedral was opened again in 1942, when Rostov was occupied by the German army.

In 1999, on the 250th anniversary of the city of Rostov, the bell tower was restored in its original form.

== Exterior and interior ==
A glimpse of the interior

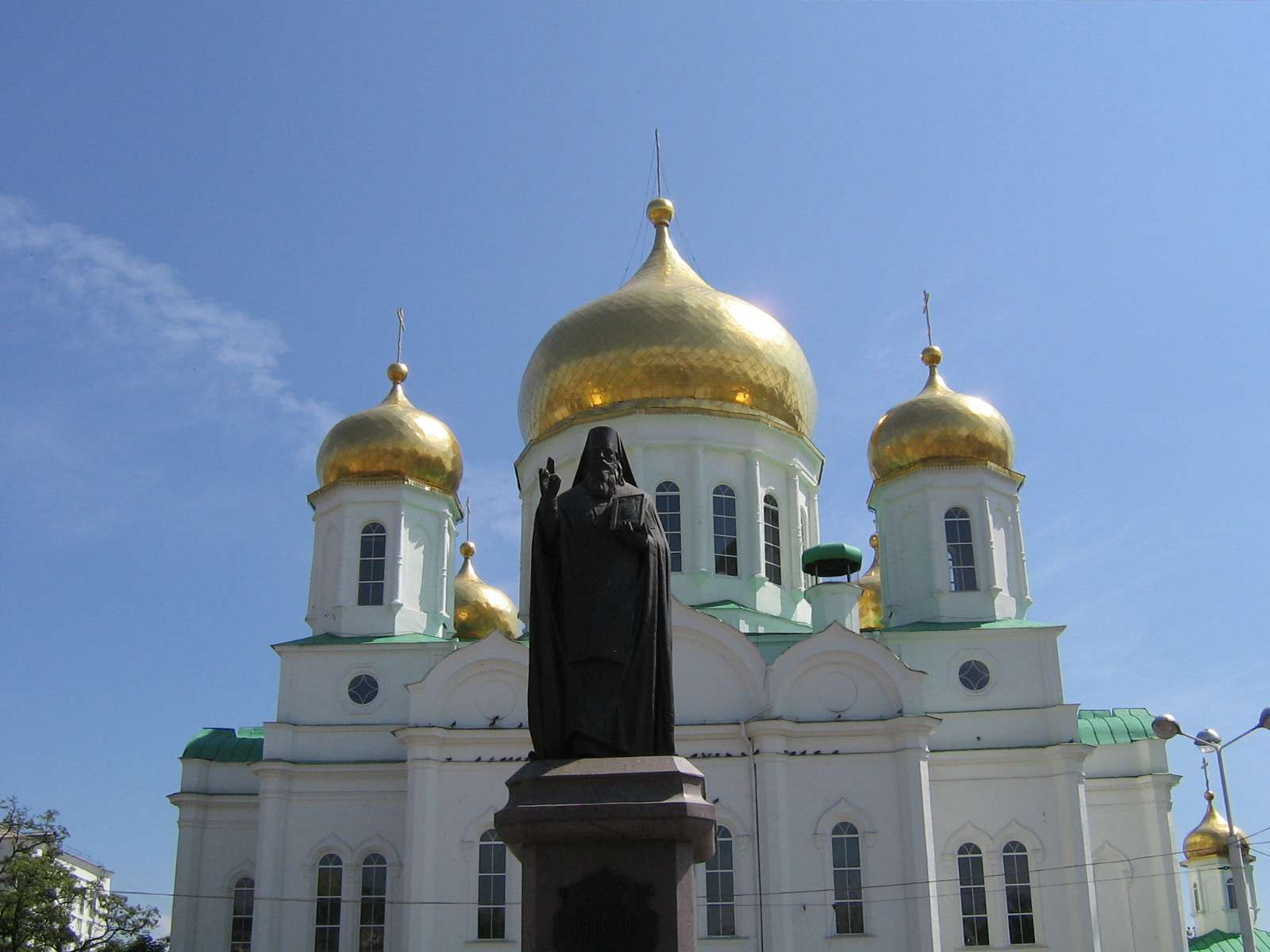
Monument to Dimitry of Rostov

Nativity Cathedral is a five-domed stone church, the building itself has a shape of cross. It was built in Russian-Byzantine style. Three-tiered iconostasis in the eastern part of the cathedral is made in the form of a chapel, topped with hipped roof and cupola.

== The bell tower ==
In 1875, the west side of the bell tower of the cathedral was founded. It was built on project of architect-engineer Anton Campioni and artist-architect Dmitry Lebedev.

During World War II there were fears that the bell tower can be used by the Germans as a reference point for artillery and bombers. In July 1942 the top two tiers were blown up. In 1949 the second tier was also demolished.

The bell tower was restored in 1999. Architect N. Solnyshkin was the author of restoration project. New bells differ from their predecessors with names and their smaller sizes.
