= Fortress of Saint Dimitry of Rostov =

Fortification structure of the Russian Empire

Fortress of Saint Dmitry of Rostov
- Rostov-on-Don
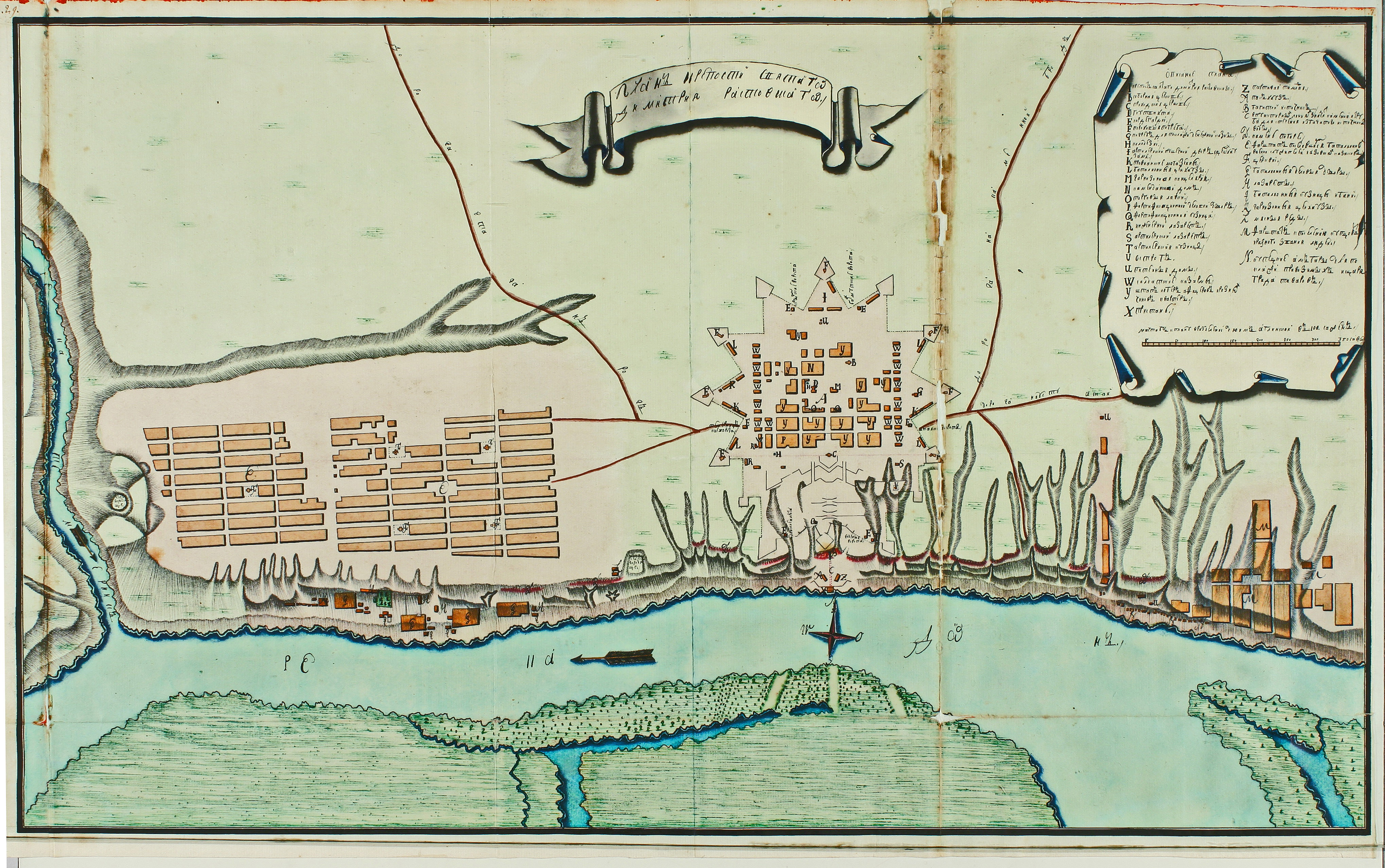
- Plan of Saint Dmitry of Rostov Fortress in 1768

Site information
- Type: Fortress
- Controlled by: Russian Empire

Location
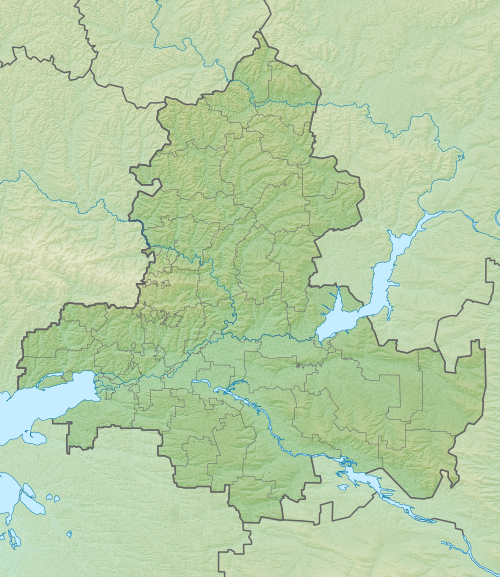
- Coordinates: 47°13′30″N 39°43′48″E

Site history
- Built: 1761–1763

The Fortress of Saint Dmitry of Rostov (Russian: Крепость Святого Димитрия Ростовского) was a fortification structure of the Russian Empire. In the middle of the 18th century it was of great military and strategic importance and also was the most powerful among the southern fortresses of Russia. The city of Rostov-on-Don was named after the fortress.

The fortress was never a direct place of any military operations; at the end of the Russo-Turkish War of 1768-1774, it lost the importance of border fortification. From one of its former vorstadt the city of Rostov-on-Don of Ekaterinoslav Governorate was established by 1811. In 1835 the garrison and military property of the Rostov Fortress was transferred to Anapa. The ramparts and bastions were demolished at the end of the 19th century.

== History ==
=== Construction ===
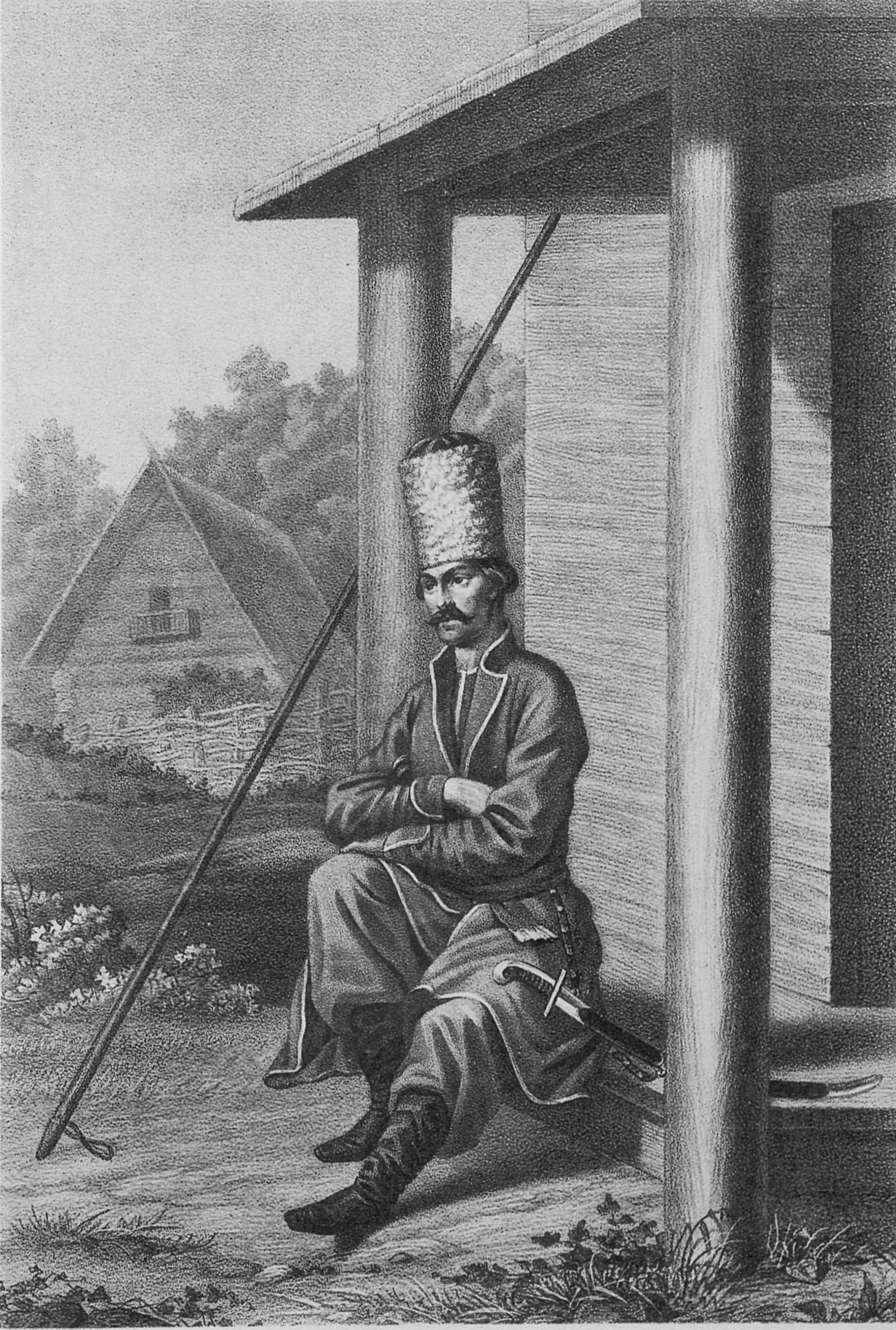
A cossack in the Fortress of Saint Dimitry, 1774.

In the 1740s there arose the need to build a more powerful fortification on the Don for the protection of Temernitskaya Customs, rather than the existing Fortress of Saint Anna. In 1744, Captain Sipyagin reported on the choice of a place for the construction of fortifications near the Rich Well tract. The Senate rejected the first seven projects, but when two other projects (stone and earth fortifications) were approved, the garrison of the fortress of St. Anna was transferred to a new place on 20 December 1760. On 6 April (17 April New Style) 1761, the Empress Elizaveta Petrovna issued the decree which granted fortress the name of Saint Dmitry of Rostov. On 23 September of the same year took place the laying of its foundations.[4] The construction works were carried out under the leadership of military engineer General Alexander Rigelman.

In 1761 Rigelman ordered to build a brick factory at the Kizierinsky Gully for the needs of construction of Saint Dimitry Fortress. Stone for construction was extracted from the Rich spring, and logs were brought from the Leontievsky and Glukhie gullies, which are located near Mius and Kalmius rivers. The forest was cut down and floated along the Mius River up to the Miuss Estuary. From the estuary, logs were transported to the construction site by horses and oxen. By 1761, seven redoubts were created in the fortress.

Earthworks and the main buildings of the fortress were completed in 1763.

=== Description ===
The fortress of St. Dimitry of Rostov was of great military and strategic importance. It was the most powerful among the southern fortifications of Russia. The circumference of the fortress was about 3.5 km, and its area - about 76 hectares.

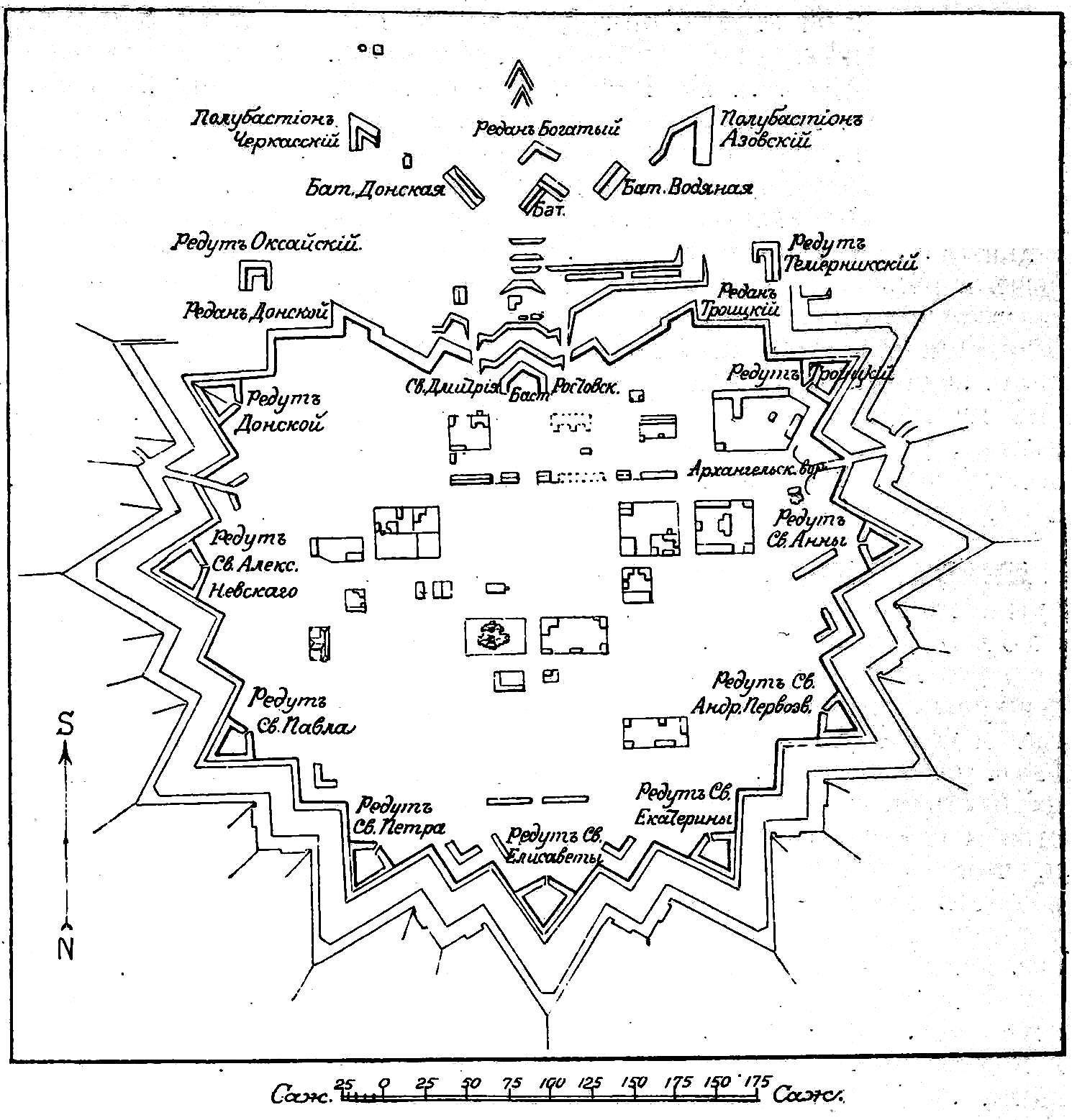
Another plan of the fortress

The fortress was star-shaped in plan and consisted of nine redoubts, surrounded by a moat and connected by eight ravelins. On the Don side, the fortress defended by a bastion with crownworks. Below the bastion, the precipitous shore was fortified with two redoubts, three batteries and two half-bastions, placed one above the other. The total length of the fortification front was 3.5 kilometers. In the fortress wall there were two gates - from the west and east sides. Redoubts were named Troitsky, Anninsky, St. Andrew, Ekaterininsky, Elizavetinsky, Petrovsky, Pavlovsky, Alexandra Nevskogo and Donskoy.

The fortress was armed with 238 guns.

Powder, artillery and food stores, 28 military barracks and military infirmaries, as well as officer houses and houses of artisans and merchants were also constructed on the territory of the fortress.

The fortress had two gates: Arkhangelsk Gates in the west, and St. George's - in the east. The streets inside the fortress, with a width of 10 to 20 meters, formed rectangular quarters. At the same time, wide streets were laid perpendicular to the river. The central street was named Bogatyanovskiy Lane (present-day Kirov Avenue).

On the central square in the fortress there was built the Intercession Cathedral. The facades of the main administrative buildings of the military department were constructed in front of this cathedral. By the end of the 18th century, five churches were built on the territory of the fortress: Sobornaya Pokrovskaya, Kazan, Nikolayevskaya, Kupecheskaya (Nativity-Theotokos) and the Church of All Saints.

In the fortress, began his service the naval commander Fyodor Ushakov. In 1778 the fortress was visited by Alexander Suvorov.

In 1768, the population of the fortress exceeded five thousand people.

At the beginning of the 19th century the fortress decayed, the fortifications were gradually destroyed, and the territory was built up. The earthen ramparts were razed. In 1835, weapons, ammunition and ammunition were transported to the Anapa Fortress.

== Legacy ==
The Monument to the founders of Rostov-on-Don Fortress was opened in 2009, in the year of 260th official anniversary of Rostov-on-Don. It presents the sculptures of Alexander Rigelman, Captain Somov (the first commander of fortress), Danila Efremov (the Ataman of the Don Army), and the merchant Hastanov (the first head of the Temernitskaya Customs).
