= May Day Park (Rostov-on-Don) =

Park in Rostov-on-Don, Russia

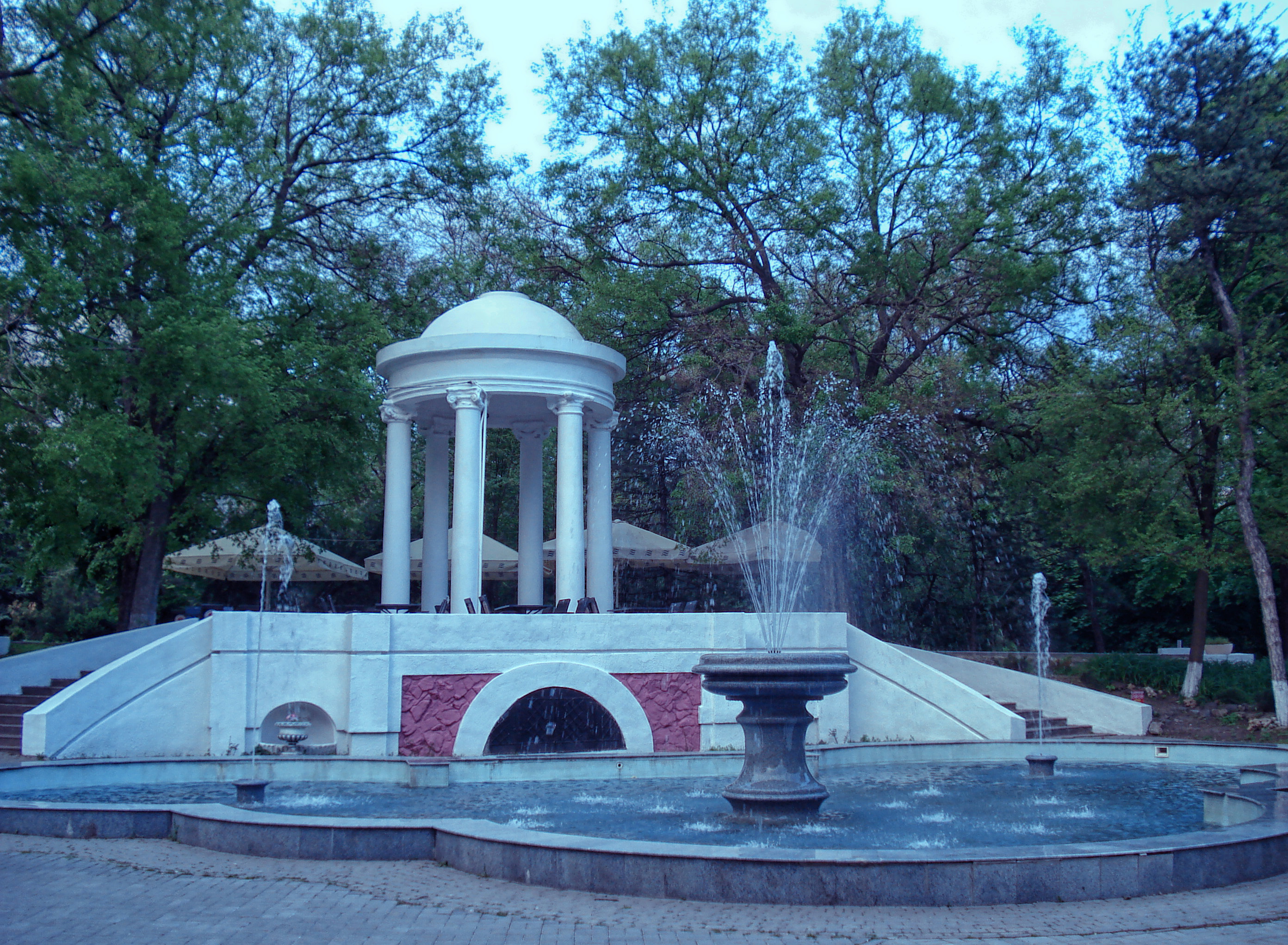
- The rotunda in May Day Park
- Interactive map of May Day Park
- Location: Rostov-on-Don, Russia
- Coordinates: 47.1339°N 39.4424°E
- Created: 1855

May Day Park (Russian: Парк имени 1 Мая) is a park in Rostov-on-Don established in 1855. It is situated in Kirovskiy City District at the site of the former Fortress of Saint Dimitry of Rostov. May Day Park have retained its historical planning and, to some extent, landscaping, as it was initially organized in the second half of the 19th century. The park has underground structures, so it is also an archeological site.

The fortress and the park are objects of cultural heritage of federal significance.

== History and description ==
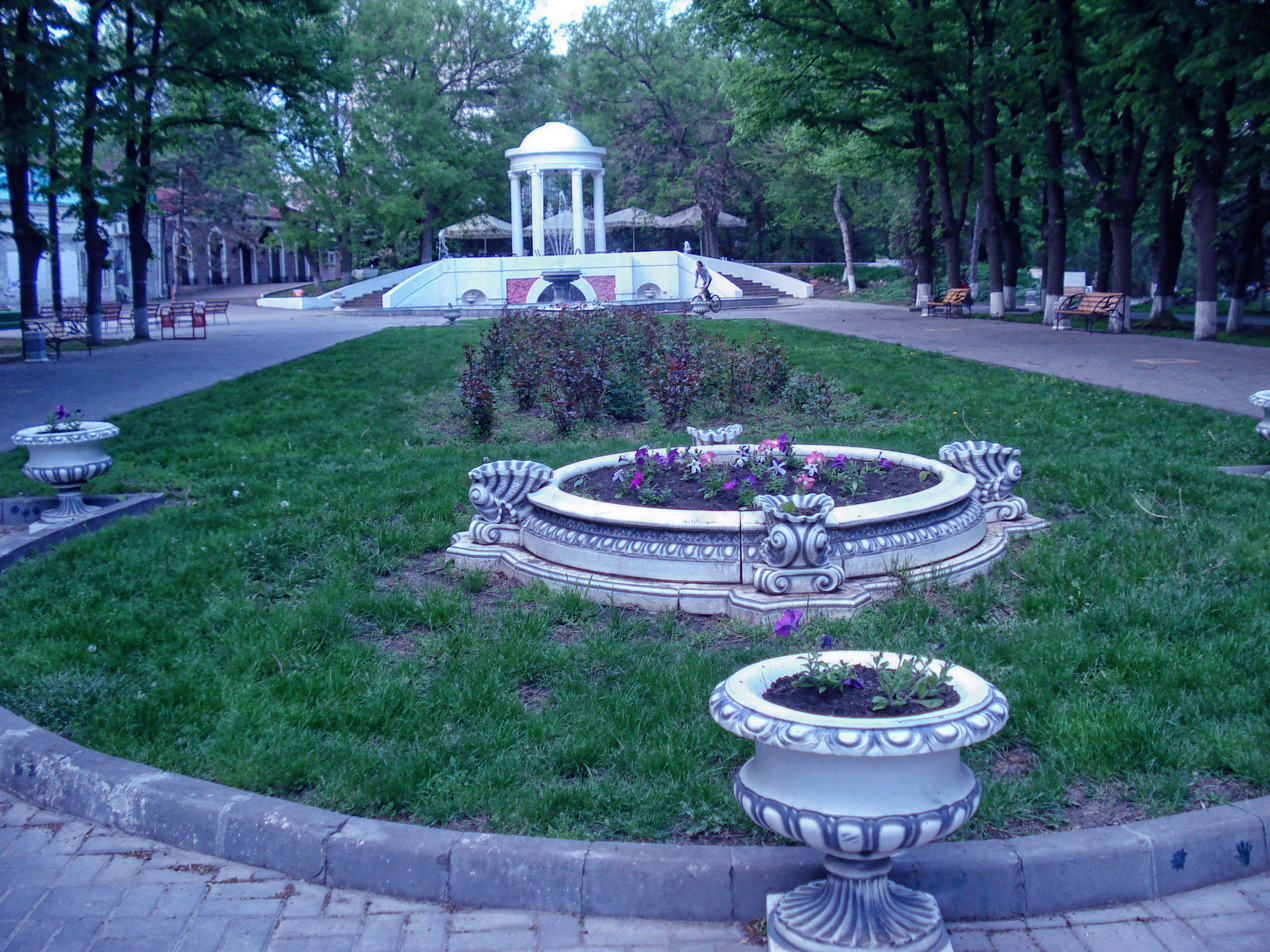
May Day Park

The territory of the former Fortress of St. Dmitry of Rostov in 1855 became the property of Rostov-on-Don Summer Commercial Club. The owners once decide to invite mr. Peters, an architect from St. Petersburg, to draft a project for the arrangement of the garden. During the construction works, the builders discovered casemates and tunnels. This was taken into account by Peters: when he was drawing his plan, he decided to arrange all the massive structures on sections that were free of underground structures. Thus, above the tunnels there were garden alleys, and a fountain was built above the two-level underground room. The main alley of the park was paved in the form of a diagonal line from the rotunda to the flower garden. On the territory of the new garden sports grounds were arranged, a greenhouse was established and an alley of lime trees was planted.

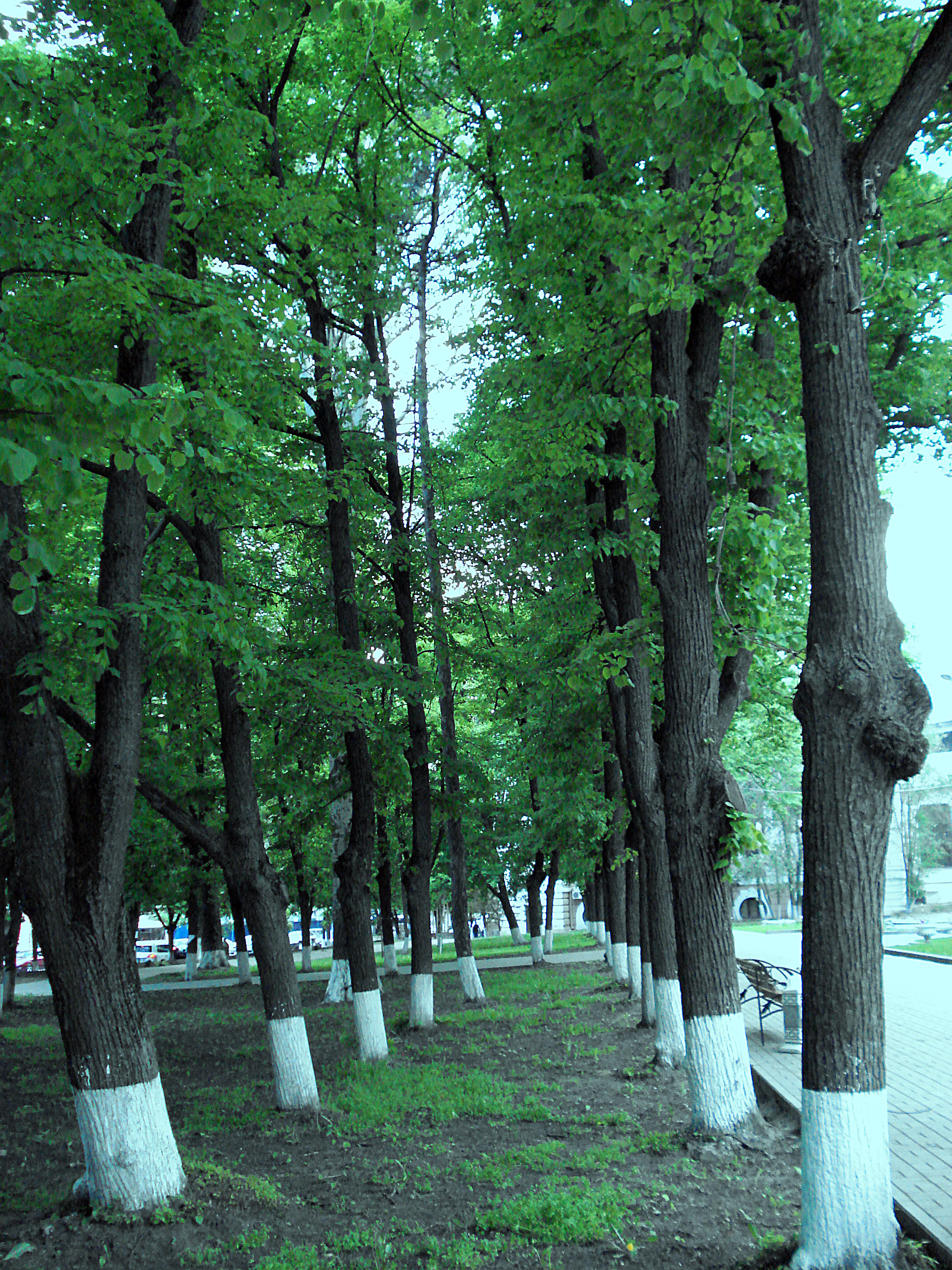
The hundred years old linden in May Day Park

In 1901, a rotunda with 6 columns in neoclassical style was also built there. The builders used old fortress brick and the author of this project was architect Nikolai Aleksandrovich Doroshenko. Under the basement of the rotunda there was an underground room. In 1912-1913 in the western part of the garden was constructed a three-storey brick building of Summer Commercial Club in Art Nouveau style, designed by architect Georgi Gelat.

At the beginning of the 20th century, this garden, which later would be known as May Day Park, was a favorite meeting place for Rostov-on-Don and Nakhichevan-on-Don dwellers. In the summer time, an orchestra played here, art performances and various musical concerts were held. In the greenhouses grew palm trees, and lighting was established here. Among the visitors were influential people of the city, merchants and local government officials.

Back in time, the park had a fence, but now it needs to be restored. In the 1920s, garden and park compositions with geometric patterns embedded in them still remained in the park. There also was a floral calendar, which was regularly updated. In the 1970s, flower exhibitions were held there. In 1986, because of the fire, the greenhouse was damaged, and at its place a parking lot was subsequently established.

At the territory of the park there is a linden alley, whose age is more than 120 years. In 2000, a new alley was planted out of 55 linden seedlings. By May 2005, five more trees were planted.

In October 2015 it was announced that the park would be reconstructed with the help of attracted investors.
