= Linden Allee (Rostov-on-don) =

Garden alley in Rostov-on-Don, Russia

Linden Allee (Russian: Липовая аллея) is a garden alley that crosses the western part of May Day Park located in the city of Rostov-on-Don in southwest Russia. It is more than 120 years old, and used to be the garden of the Summer Commercial Club, now called the House of Physical Culture Rostov-on-Don.

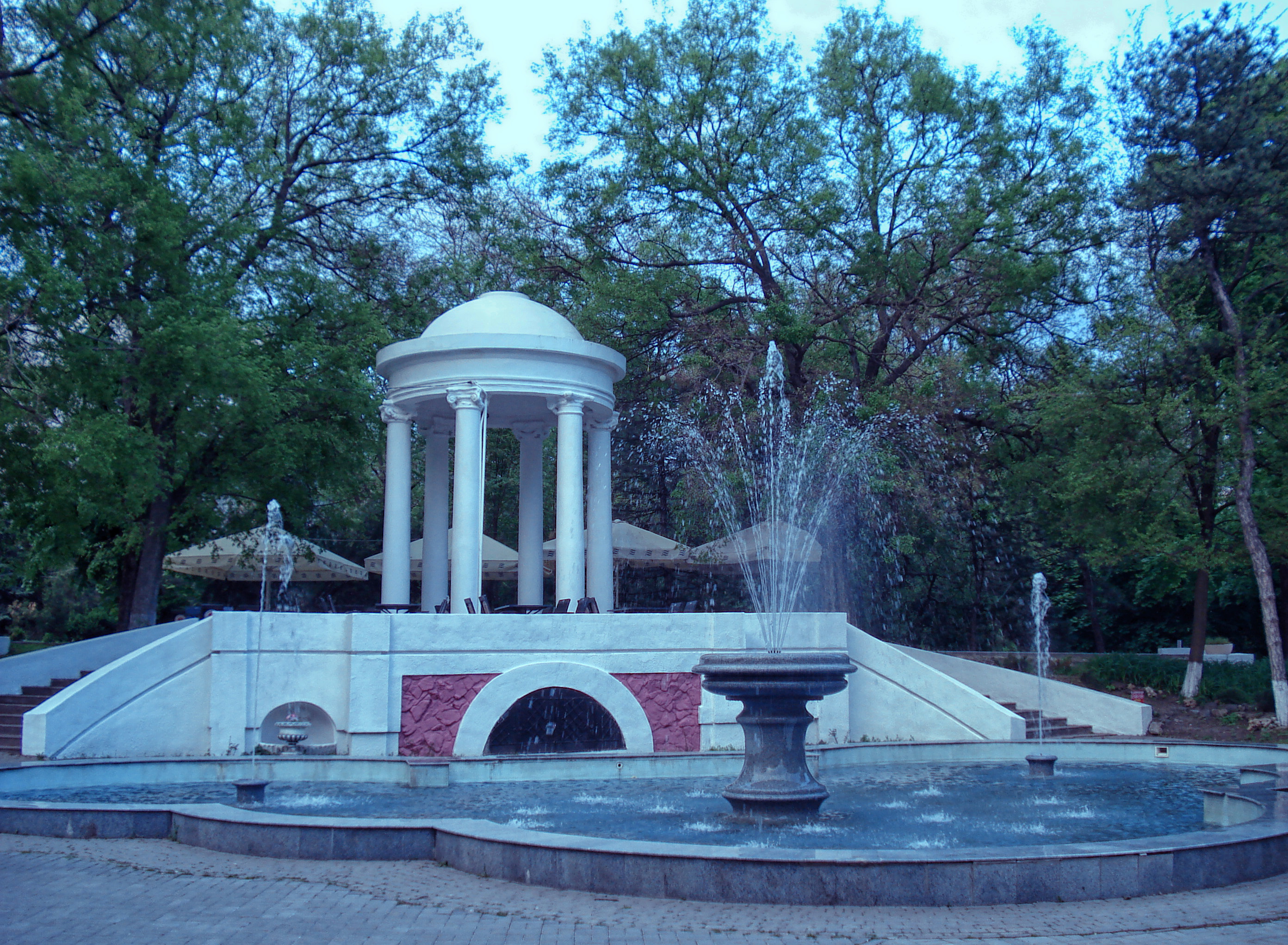
Pervomayskiy Park. Rotunda

== History and description ==
The garden area was laid out in 1860 by the St. Petersburg architect Peters. The alley follows the underground gallery that connects a hill (remaining from the excavation of the earthen rampart of a fortress) to the basements of former warehouse buildings near Bolshaya Sadovaya street.

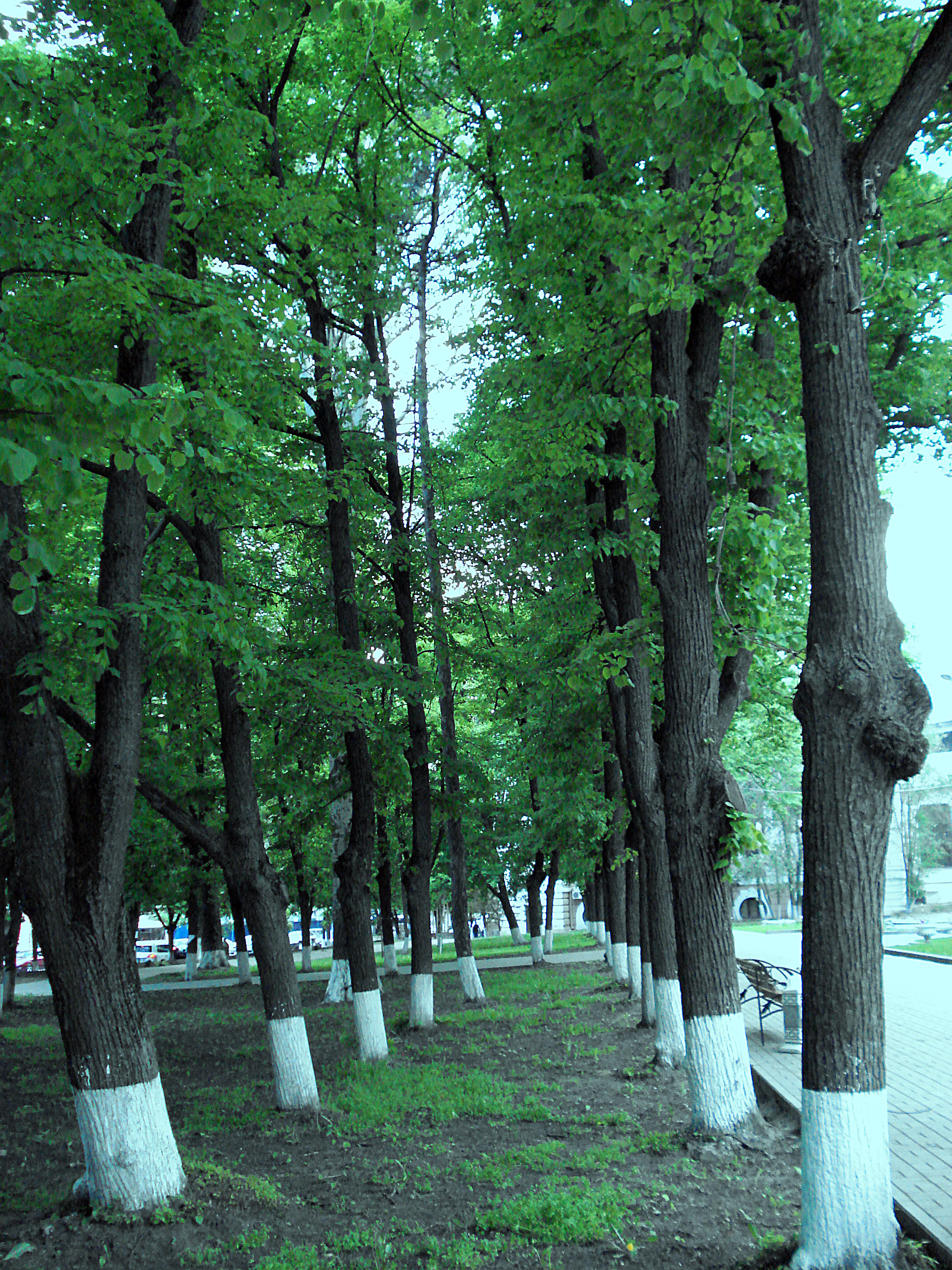
Ancient lindens in Pervomaysky Park

Avenues of linden trees were planted on both sides of the alley in the early 1890s. At its center are lawns enclosed by flower beds decorated with floral carpet patterns adding elegant festivity to the space between the trees.

In 1901, the east end of the alley was closed off by a memorial rotunda erected on the hill formerly occupied by the fortress. The rotunda was set in the upper basement level, hiding the remains of the earthworks. A fountain was installed in front of the rotunda in the 1910s. The rotunda's gazebo features six Ionic columns under a low dome. Its vantage point is oriented to facilitate views of the arrangements of the flower beds.

The alley remained intact until the end of the 20th century, escaping damage from bombings and fires during military operations against Rostov-on-Don during the first and second World Wars. After the park greenhouse was dismantled in 1986, the lawns and flower beds lost their former beauty and richness. More recently, the lindens' canopies have grown unchecked, and sometimes invade the modern pavilions of the Park or encroach upon the alley.

== Source ==
- Voloshinov V. F., Voloshinov L. F. 100 unique places of the Rostov region: an Illustrated Handbook. Rostov-on-Don: Rostizdat, 2011.-176 p., Il. ISBN 978-5-7509-0631-4
