= Monument to the founders of Rostov-on-Don =

- Russian: Памятник основателям Ростовской крепости
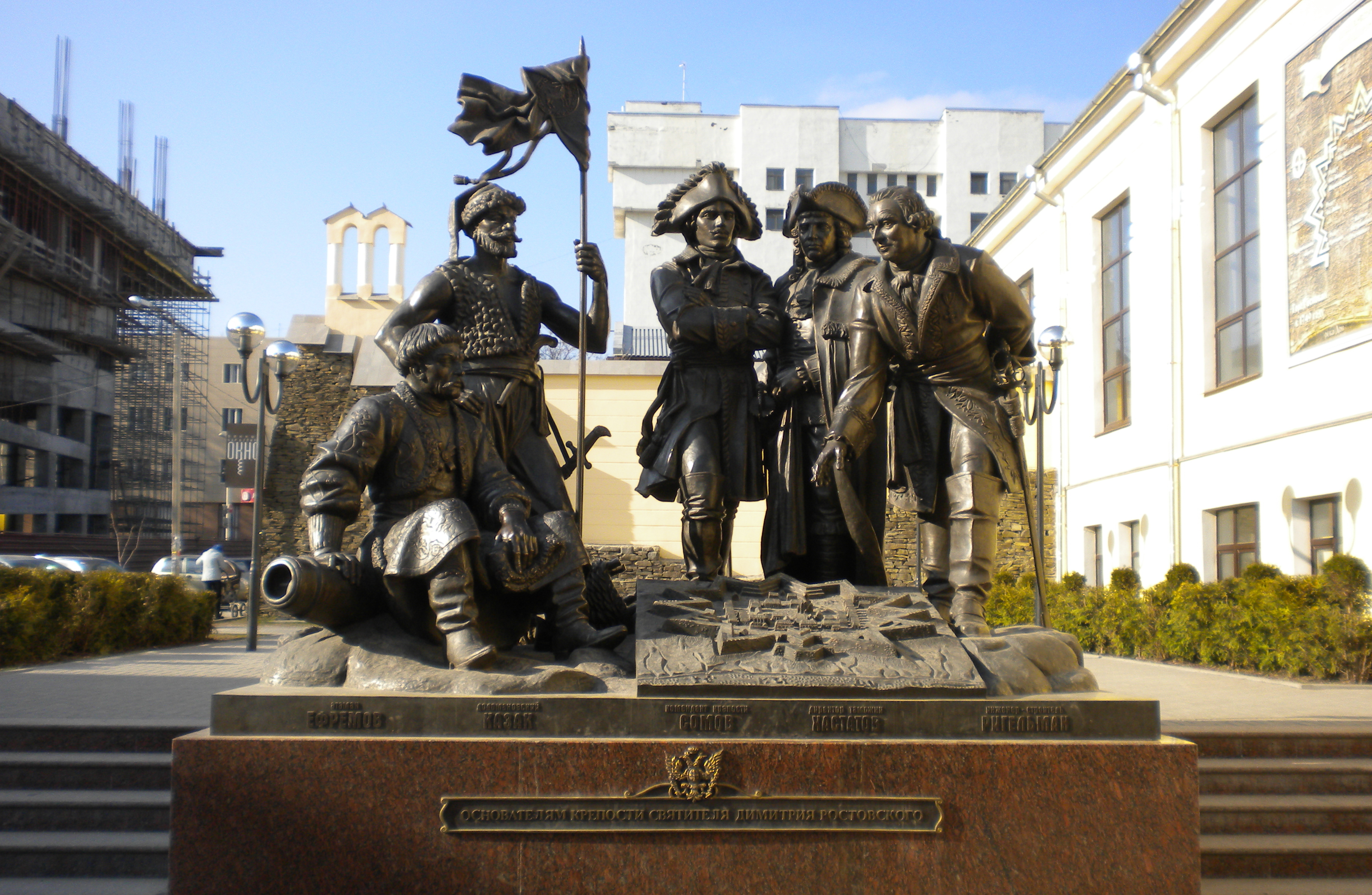
- Current state (2010)
- Interactive map of Monument to the founders of Rostov-on-Don
- Location: Bolshaya Sadovaya Street in Rostov-on-Don, Russia
- Coordinates: 47°13′35″N 39°44′13″E
- Designer: V. Fomenko
- Type: Monument
- Material: Bronze
- Opening date: December 15, 2009

Monument to the founders of Rostov-on-Don (Russian: Памятник основателям Ростовской крепости) is a bronze monument of founders of Rostov-on-Don on Bolshaya Sadovaya street in Rostov-on-Don, Russia. Sculptor Sergei Oleshnya and architect V. Fomenko created design of the sculptures of five Rostov-on-Don founders: Alexander Rigelman (construction manager), Ivan Somov (the first commandant), Vasily Hastatov (customs manager), Danila Yefremov (commander of the Don Cossack Host) and a cossack. The opening ceremony of the monument took place on 15 December 2009 and was held in conjunction by the 260-year anniversary of Rostov-on-Don.

The monument is a 5-ton massive bronze sculpture composition. The monument is designed in the style of a city sculpture. The small pedestal slightly rises above the street level. The pedestal is built into a low four-step ladder, which leads to the platform. Ataman Yefremov sits on a trophy cannon, the cossack keeps the flag flying. Other sculptures bower over raised plan of the fortress.

Some of the locals criticized the composition for this scene has nothing to do with Rostov-on-Don. The project of the fortress was not discussed. The fortress was designed in Saint-Petersburg by engineer Vendeev and adjusted several times, maybe with the participation of A. Rigelman. Rigelman arrived on the Almighty Don Host as a construction engineer, who was required to put into effect introduced the plan of the fortress. He had not authority to discuss with someone else this project.
