= The Rich Well =

Monument in Russia

- Богатый колодезь (Russian)
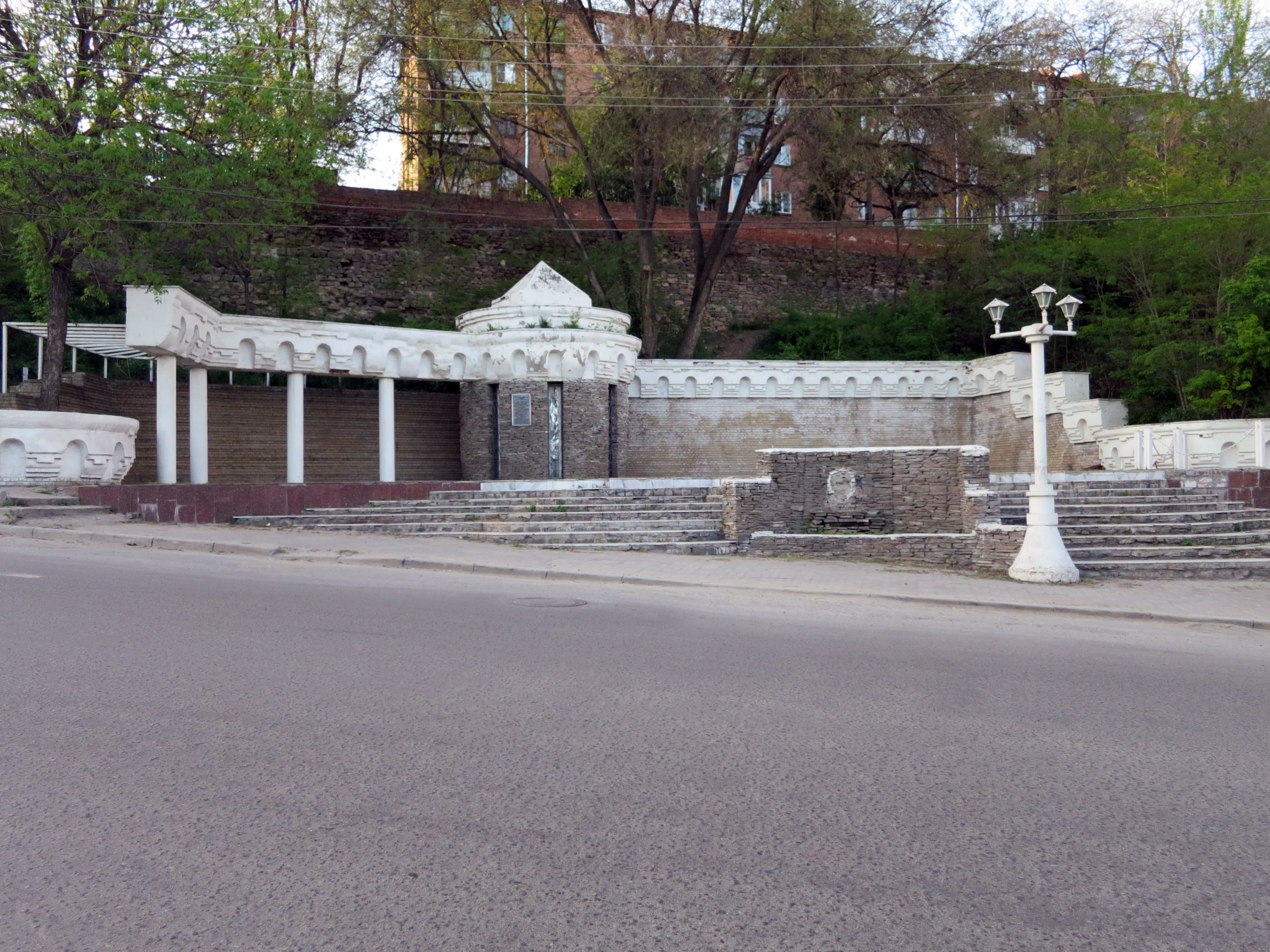

- Location within Russia
- Type: Spring
- Location: Rostov-on-Don, Rostov oblast Russia

History
- Built: end of XVII century

Bogatuanovsky spring (The Rich Well) is a monument of history and nature in the city of Rostov-on-Don on the Bogatuanovsky descent, situated between Sedova Street and Beregovaya Street.

== The history and description ==
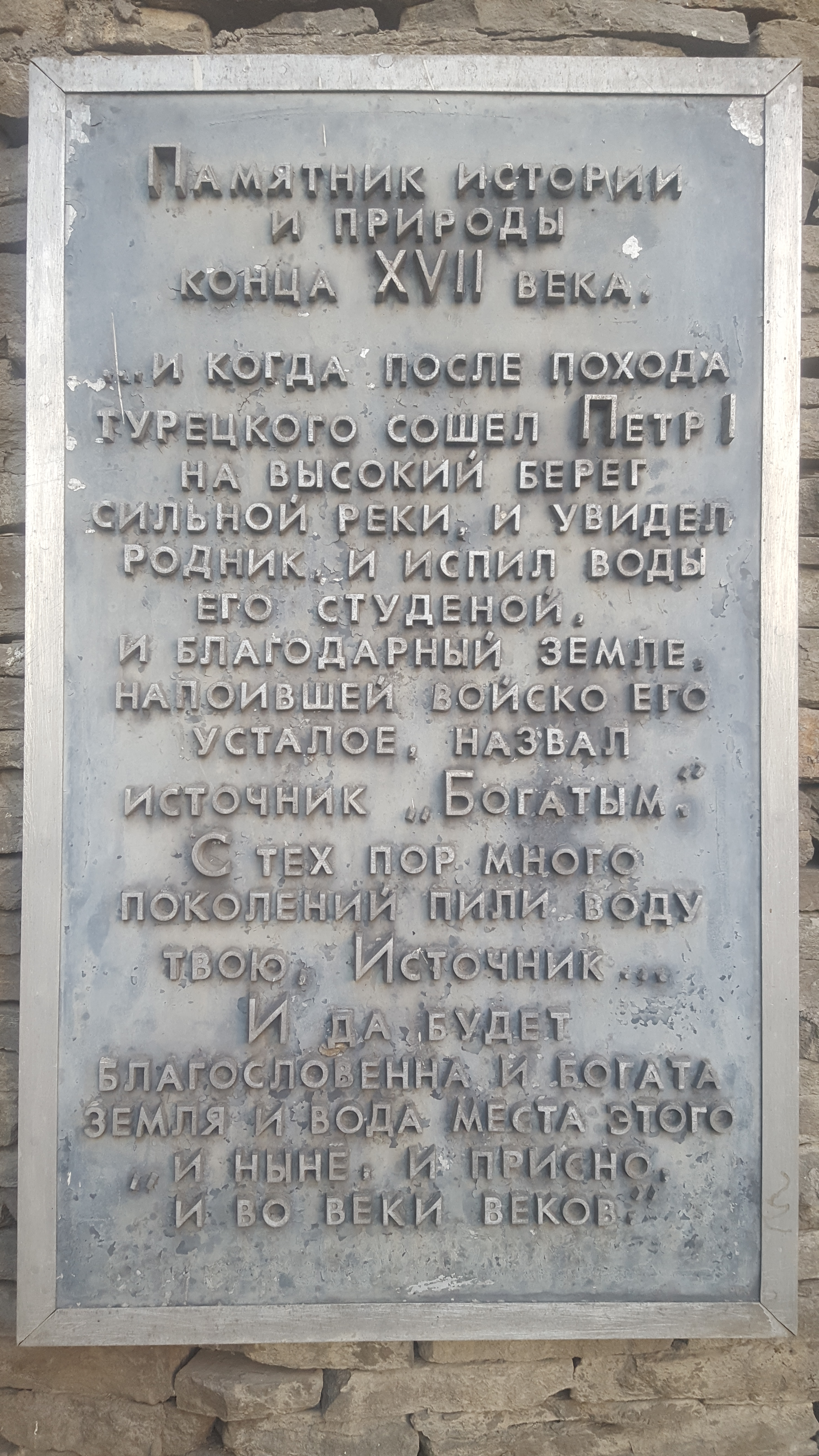
Memorial plaque

According to the legend, young sir Petr Alekseevich, traveling around the neighborhood with his generals, watched the movement of Russian ships to the shipyard to the mouth of Temernik. Noticing the place, where springs were flowing from the calcareous slope, sir, drinking water from the most deep-water spring, exclaimed:

‘’The rich well!’’

This place got such a geographical name, when the drafting of the first Russian maps of the territories near the Don River was after the conquest of Azov.

Temernitskaya customs house was founded in 1749 near the Rich well.

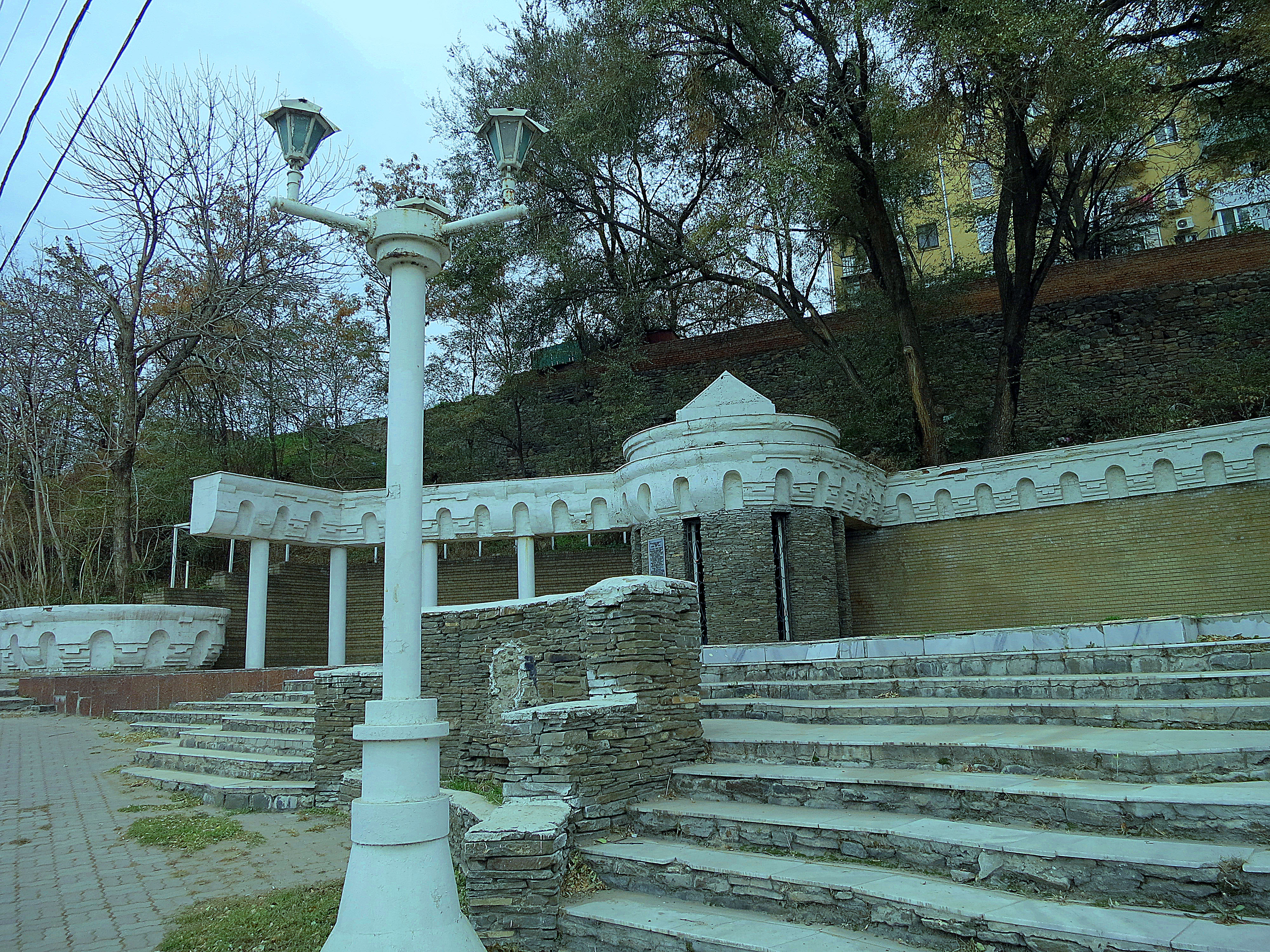
The Rich Well

Then, the spring, which called Bogatuanovsky spring, supplied water to the city's quarters in 19 and 20 centuries. The first city plumbing, which began its work in 1860, took water from Bogatuanovsky spring. from the mid-1920s the water from the spring is used only for technical purposes. On the eve of the 250th anniversary of Rostov-on-Don, the rotunda and the territory around it were reconstructed using the forms of industrial architecture of the end of 19 century, installed memorial plaque.
