= Kechekyan Mansion =

- Особняк Кечекьяна
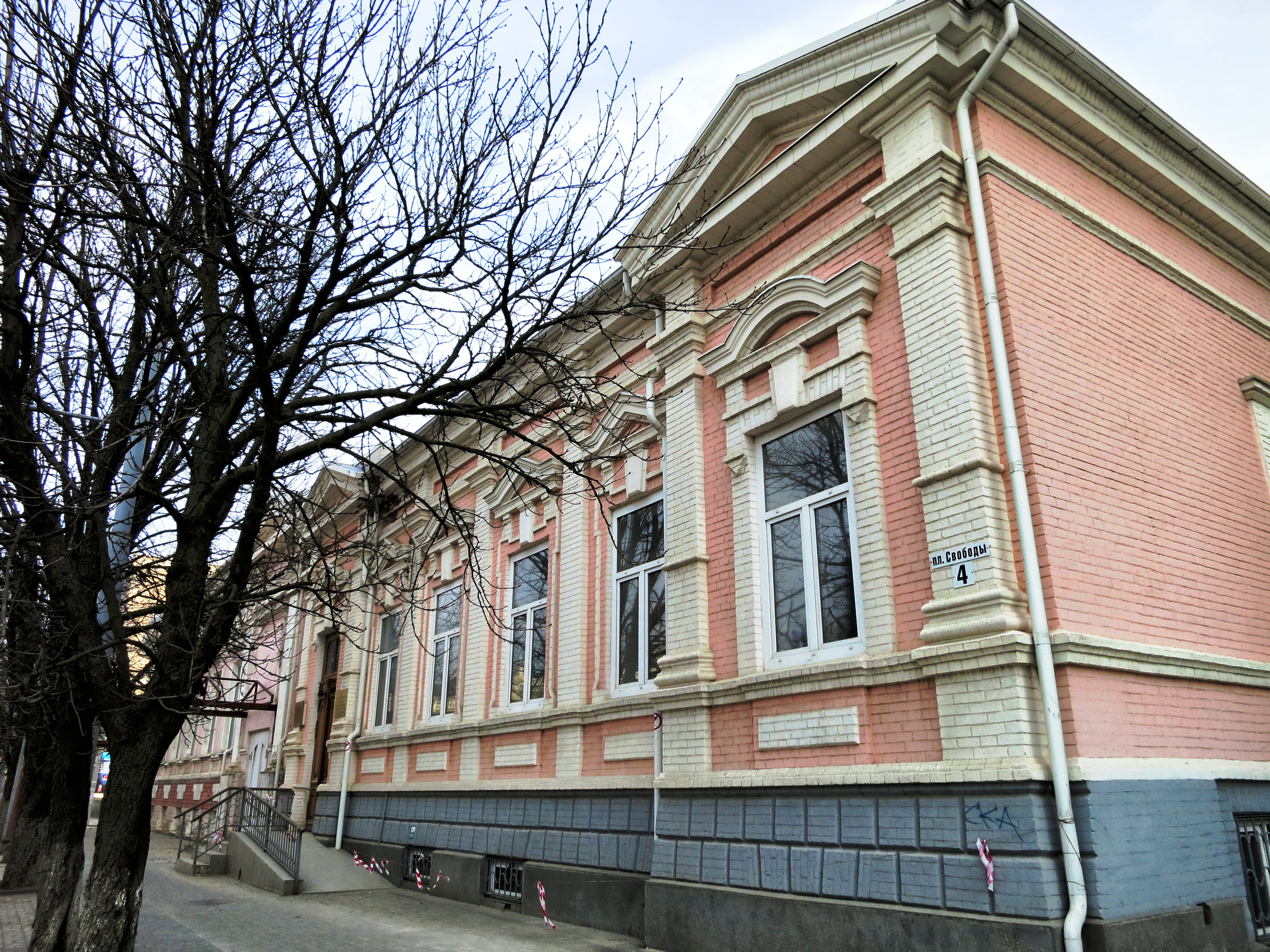
- 47°13′43″N 39°45′48″E
- Location: House 4, Liberty Square, Rostov-on-Don

The Kechekyan Mansion (Russian: Особняк Кечекьяна) is a building in Rostov-on-Don located at Liberty Square. It was constructed in the third quarter of the 19th century on the central square of the city of Nakhichevan-on-Don (now part of Proletarsky District, Rostov-on-Don). The mansion is currently occupied by the A. S. Pushkin Children's Library. The building has the status of an object of cultural heritage of regional significance.

== History ==
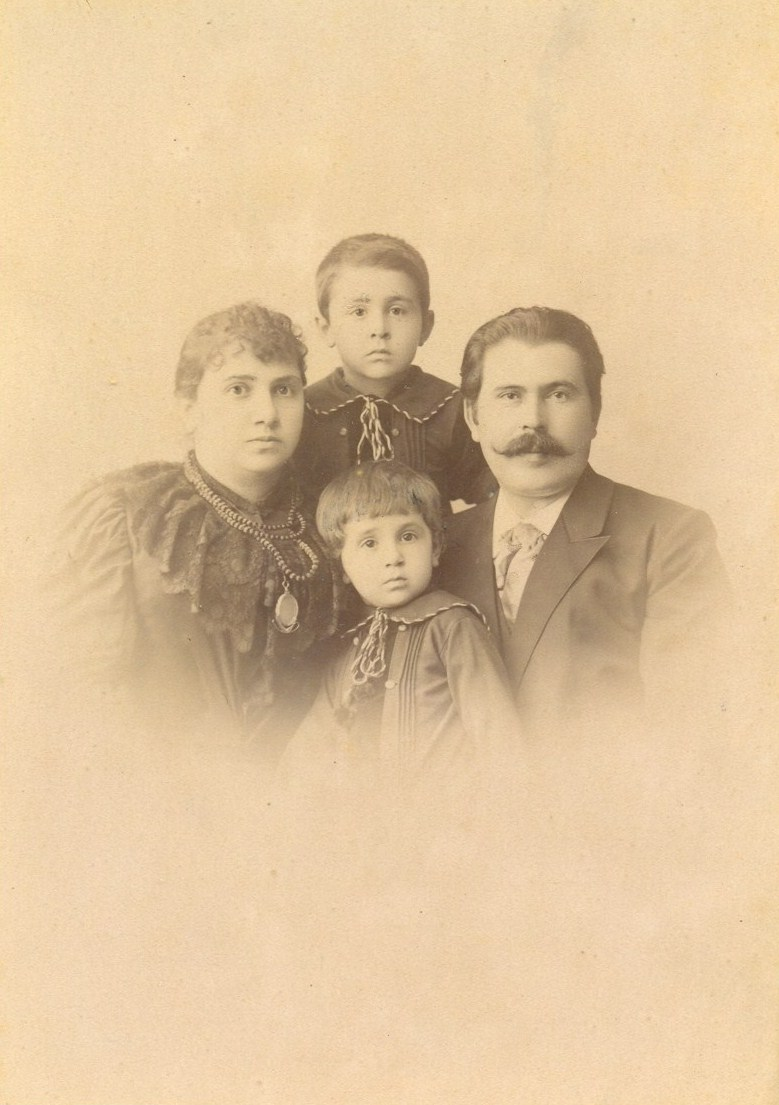
The Kechekyan family, 1893

The mansion on Nakhichevan-on-Don's Bulvarnaya Square was built the third quarter of the 19th century, with its initial address being House 7, Bulvarnaya Square. City architect Nikolai Durbakh oversaw its construction. Contemporary documents show that the house belonged to Olga Tarasovna Hodzhayeva, a member of the bourgeoisie, since at least 1886. In 1894 Hodzhayeva sold the manor for 8,000 rubles in silver to Iskugi Khacheresovna Kechekyan (née Aladzhalova), the wife of the doctor Fyodor (Astvatsatur) Stepanovich Kechekyan.

The Kechekyans lived in the mansion with their children. Iskugi Khacheresovna Kechekyan was a member of the Armenian Women's Charitable Society "Care" and a member of the board of "The Nakhchivan N. Nikolaev Charitable Society of Benefits to the Poor". Her brother was the artist Manuil Aladzhalov. Fedor Stepanovich Kechekyan was a city doctor, a public official of the City Duma of Nakhichevan-on-Don, a member of the Financial Commission of the City Duma, the Hospital Commission of the City Duma, the "Nakhichevan Armenian Charitable Society", and a board member of the "Nakhichevan Department of the Society for Water Rescue". He was also a member of the Board of Trustees of the Yekaterinskaya Women's Gymnasium, the Board of Trustees of the "Women's Commercial Courses", and held the Order of Saint Anna third class.

After the establishment of the Soviet Union, the mansion was nationalized. In 1926 (according to other sources — in 1929) the A. S. Pushkin Children's Library took over the building.

== Description ==
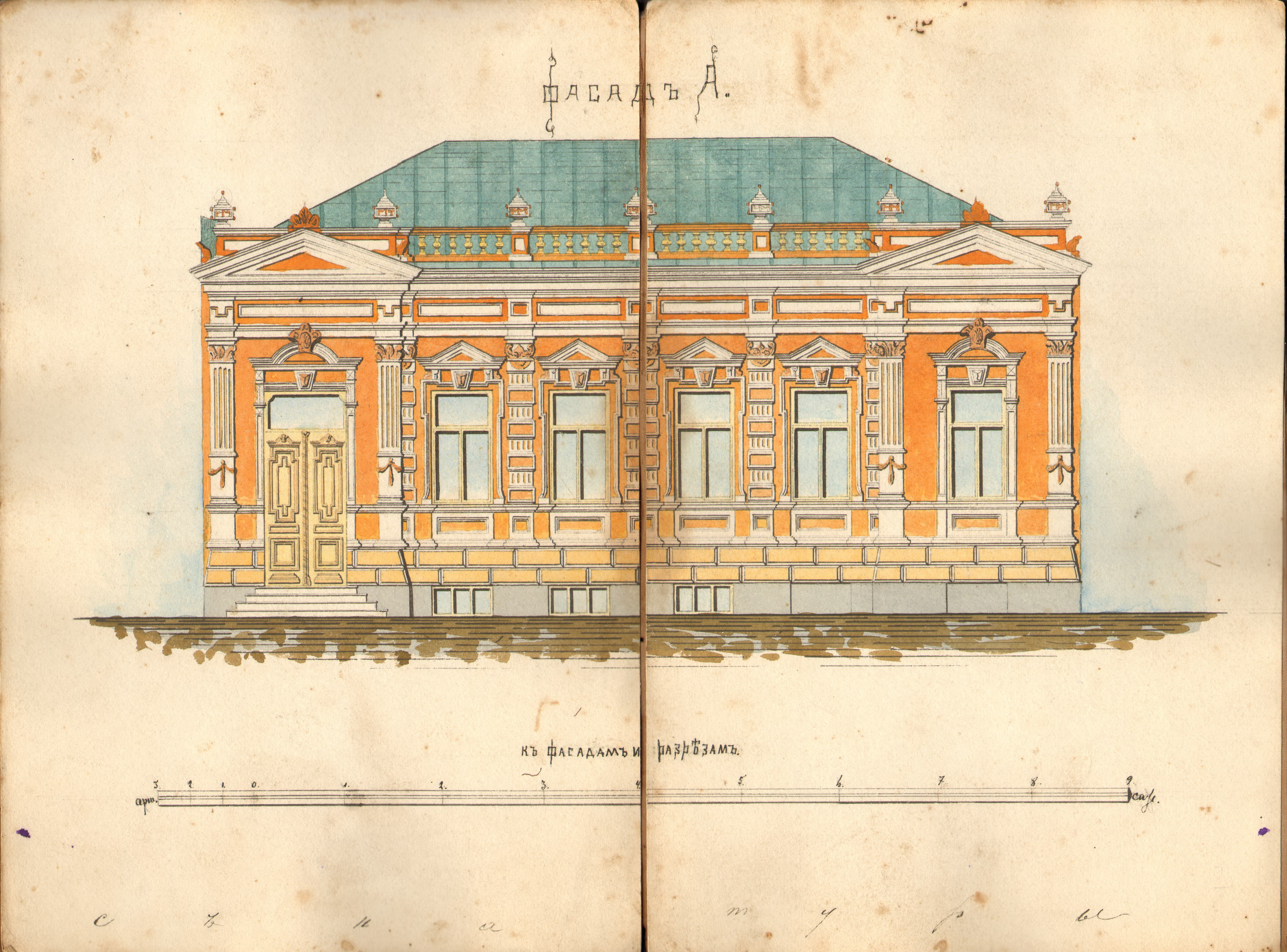
Facade of the Kechekyan Mansion, dated 20 August 1895

A one-storey mansion with the high ground floor, the main facade overlooks Liberty Square. In the east, the house is adjoined by the Sagirov mansion. Behind the Kechekyan Mansion is a courtyard where previously outbuildings were located: an ice house, coach house, and stable. The front facade has classical order composition. Extreme ripples are accented by pilaster portals. The four central window openings are decorated with platbands and sandrids in the Baroque style. The main entrance is located on the left side, the original wooden door has survived to this day. At the beginning of the 20th century, a dome with a spire was erected over the hallway, but this has since been lost.

The rooms of the mansion were located in two rows: along the main facade and along the courtyard facade. Three windows of the central hall faced the main facade. The hall was adjoined by a study and a living room. The library and other living rooms faced the courtyard. The ground floor had a separate entrance from the courtyard. There was an office where the doctor F. S. Kechekyan received patients. From the side of the courtyard, a small veranda adjoined the mansion.
