= Sagirov mansion =

Mansion in Russia

- Особняк Сагирова
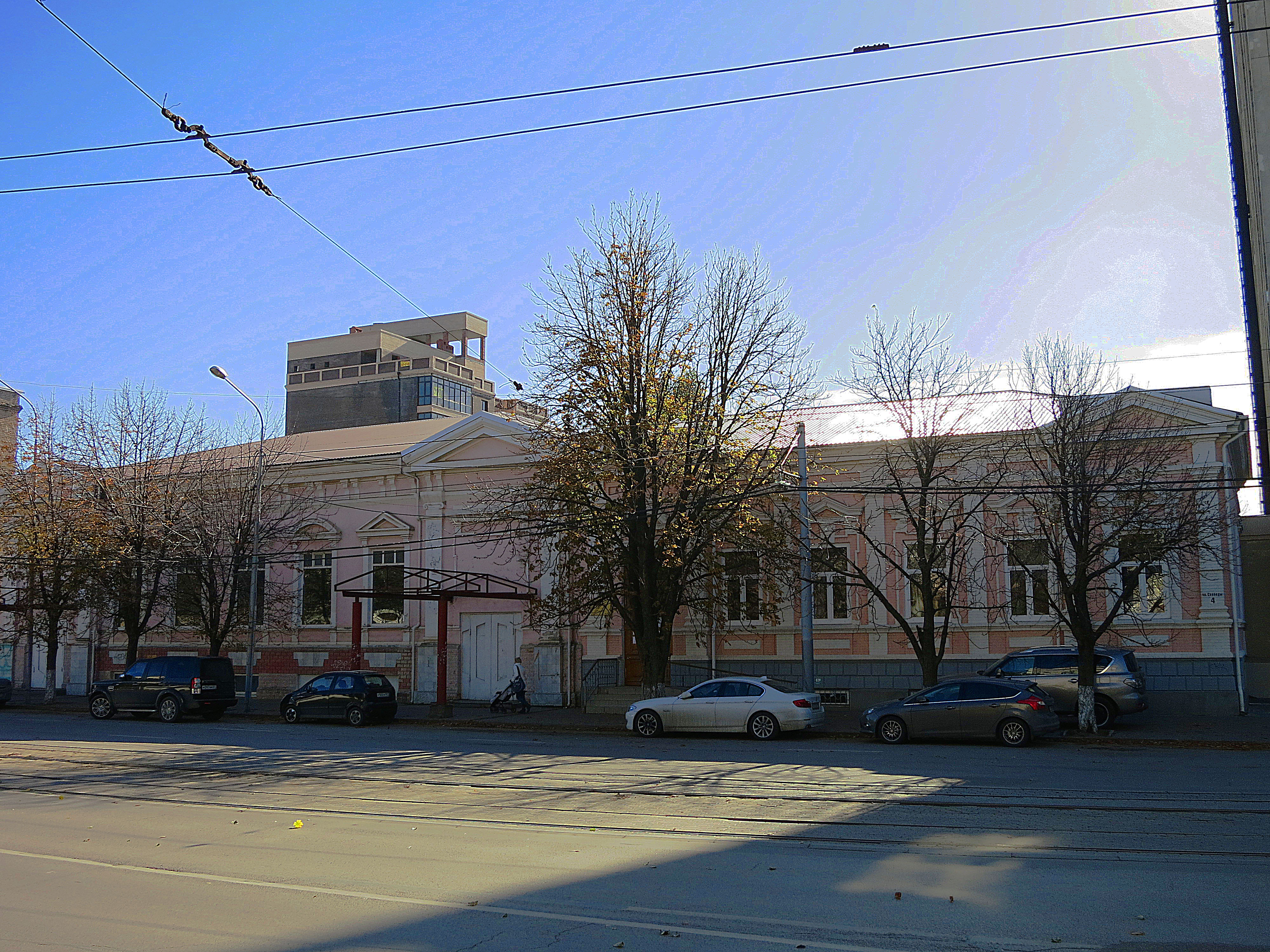
- Interactive map of Sagirov mansion
- Location: Rostov-on-Don, Liberty Square, house 6
- Coordinates: 47°13′44″N 39°45′50″E
- Designer: N. N. Durbakh (architect)
- Completion date: 1890s

The Sagirov Mansion (Russian: Особняк Сагирова) is a building in Rostov-on-Don located at Liberty Square. It is constructed in the 1890s on the central square of the city of Nakhchivan-on-Don (nowadays as a part of Proletarsky district of Rostov-on-Don). The building has the status of an object of cultural heritage of regional value.

== History and description ==
Development of the project of the building is attributed to the city architect of Nakhchivan-on-Don to N. N. Durbakh. In the mansion there lived a hlebopromyshlennik A. S. Sagirov. In 1906 the building was got by A. Shelgunova. At the beginning of the 1910th years, the mansion was rented by the businessman B. A. Kamerstein who opened in it a cinematography of Eldorado – one of the first in the city.

In 1921 the movie theater was renamed into honor of the 3rd International. In three years it began to be called "Casino". By the end of the 1920th years, the movie theater received the name Spartak. After the war, the mansion lost a canopy over an entrance and a part of a modeled decor. During a change of the equipment at the movie theater planning was changed, the new entrance appeared. In 1999 to the anniversary of the city repairs under the leadership of the architect Mr. Shevchenko was made. The architect and the restorer Lyubov Voloshinova noted the bad quality of this repair: the socle was revetted with a melkorazmerny cement tile, the initial color scale was changed, modern metal canopies are built.

The Polutoraetazhny mansion is turned by the main facade on Liberty Square. In the east, the house is adjoined by the Kechekyan Mansion. In the registration of the house of Sagirov elements of classicism and baroque are combined. The side raskrepovka finished by triangular pediments are allocated. In the central part of a facade five rectangular windows issued by decorative platbands. The facade comes to the end with eaves on which decorative modeled vases settled down earlier.

Initially in the southern part of the mansion the lobby and the ceremonial hall, and in northern – a drawing room and bedrooms settled down. The first floor was occupied by utility rooms. The ceremonial hall was visually divided by poles, one couple of which was decorated with caryatids, and another – Atlases. Walls were decorated with eaves and decorative friezes, on a ceiling three modeled plafonds were placed.
