= Rostov-on-Don Cathedral Mosque =

Mosque in Rostov-on-Don, Rostov, Russia

Coordinates: 47°16′21″N 39°43′27″E

Rostov-on-Don Cathedral Mosque Соборная мечеть Ростова-на-Дону
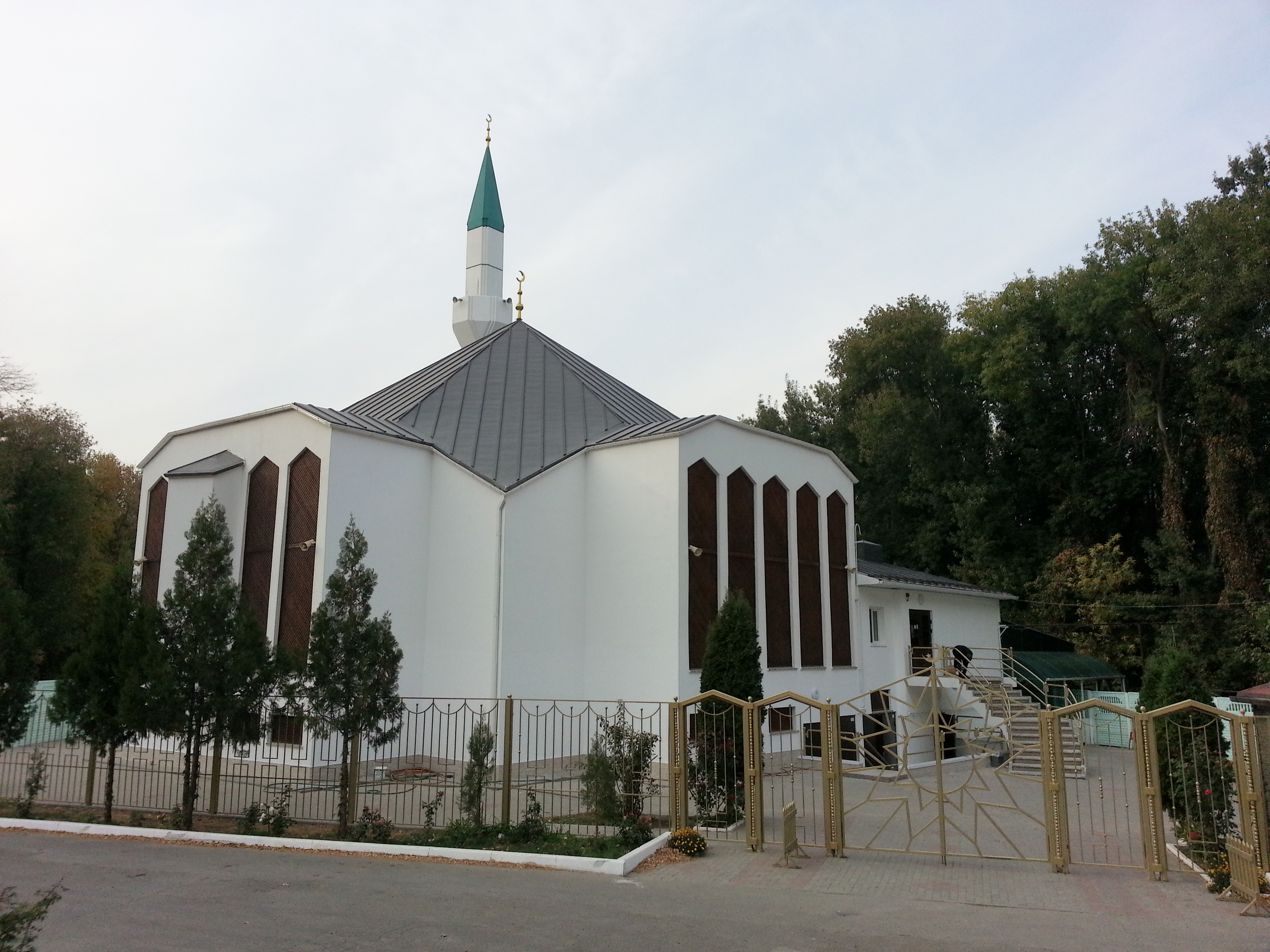

Religion
- Affiliation: Islam

Location
- Location: Rostov-on-Don, Russia
- Interactive map of Rostov-on-Don Cathedral Mosque; Соборная мечеть Ростова-на-Дону

Architecture
- Type: Mosque
- Completed: 2003

Specifications
- Minaret: 1
- Materials: brick

Rostov-on-Don Cathedral Mosque (Russian: Соборная мечеть Ростова-на-Дону) is the only functioning mosque in the city of Rostov-on-Don, Rostov Oblast, Russia.

== History ==
At the beginning of the 20th century, on Krasnoarmeyskaya street of the city there was a built a large Central Mosque. In 1968, it was closed on the order of city authorities without any explanation. Later Muslim community have been allocated a plot of land within the territory of a city park, which is situated at the center of Rostov-on-Don. Attempts to begin construction of a mosque in the city led to conflicts between local residents. As a result, a place for a mosque in Rostov-on-Don was found in a forest park area where no residential buildings were situated within a radius of one hundred meters.

== Architecture ==
The new mosque was being built from 1999 to 2003. The building has two stories: the first one is used for prayer by women and is occupied by Sunday school, while the second one is entirely accommodated for men who can pray here.

Near the two-story building of the mosque rises a 27-meter-high minaret. At the weekend, the mosque holds classes on the study of Arabic language, Koran and the history of Islam. Up to 1,500 people can come here for worship at the same time.
