= Kamensk-Shakhtinsky constituency =

Russian legislative constituency

Kamensk-Shakhtinsky single-member constituency
- Constituency of the Russian State Duma
- Deputy: None
- Federal subject: Rostov Oblast
- Districts: Bokovsky, Chertkovsky, Donetsk, Kamensk-Shakhtinsky, Kamensky, Kasharsky, Millerovsky, Milyutinsky, Morozovsky, Oblivsky, Sholokhovsky, Sovetsky, Tarasovsky, Tatsinsky, Verkhnedonskoy
- Voters: 436,922 (2005)

The Kamensk-Shakhtinsky constituency (No.144 (Note: No.143 in 1993-1995)) was a Russian legislative constituency in Rostov Oblast in 1993–2007. It covered parts of Eastern Donbass and northern Rostov Oblast. The seat was last occupied by United Russia faction member Vadim Varshavsky, a billionaire businessman in coal mining and metallurgy, who won a by-election in 2004.

The constituency was dissolved in 2007 when State Duma adopted full proportional representation for the next two electoral cycles. Kamensk-Shakhtinsky constituency was not re-established for the 2016 election, currently all of former Kamensk-Shakhtinsky constituency is part of Belaya Kalitva constituency.

== Boundaries ==
1993–1995: Belaya Kalitva, Belokalitvinsky District, Bokovsky District, Chertkovsky District, Donetsk, Kamensk-Shakhtinsky, Kamensky District, Kasharsky District, Millerovo, Millerovsky District, Milyutinsky District, Morozovsky District, Oblivsky District, Sholokhovsky District, Sovetsky District, Tarasovsky District, Tatsinsky District, Verkhnedonskoy District
The constituency covered parts of Eastern Donbass and mostly rural northern Rostov Oblast.

1993–2007: Bokovsky District, Chertkovsky District, Donetsk, Kamensk-Shakhtinsky, Kamensky District, Kasharsky District, Millerovo, Millerovsky District, Milyutinsky District, Morozovsky District, Oblivsky District, Sholokhovsky District, Sovetsky District, Tarasovsky District, Tatsinsky District, Verkhnedonskoy District
After 1995 redistricting the constituency lost Belaya Kalitva and Belokalitvinsky District to the newly-created Belaya Kalitva constituency. The rest of the Kamensk-Shakhtinsky constituency retained intact.

== Members elected ==
Election	Member	Party
1993	Boris Danchenko	Independent
1995	Boris Danchenko	Agrarian Party
1999	Boris Danchenko	Communist Party
2003	Vladimir Litvinov (Note: drowned in June 2005)	United Russia
2005	Vadim Varshavsky	Independent

== Election results ==
=== 1993 ===
==== Declared candidates ====
- Mikhail Bardakov (DPR), youth club lecturer
- Viktor Burkhovetsky (Independent), coal mine director
- Georgy Chernov (Independent), Deputy Chief of Property Management for the Rostov-on-Don Administration
- Boris Danchenko (Independent), Deputy Head of Administration of Kasharsky District – Head of the Department of Agriculture (1991–present)
- Sergey Ryndin (Independent), Chairman of the Rostov Oblast Property Fund

==== Results ====
Summary of the 12 December 1993 Russian legislative election in the Kamensk-Shakhtinsky constituency
Candidate	Party	Votes	%
Boris Danchenko	Independent	125,650	35.54%
Viktor Burkhovetsky	Independent	60,351	17.07%
Mikhail Bardakov	Democratic Party	47,743	13.50%
Georgy Chernov	Independent	31,120	8.80%
Sergey Ryndin	Independent	23,580	6.67%
against all			
Total		353,538	100%

=== 1995 ===
==== Declared candidates ====
- Boris Danchenko (APR), incumbent Member of State Duma (1994–present)
- Vladimir Gavrilov ((ROD), businessman
- Aleksandr Kasyanov (LDPR), coordinator of the party regional office
- Lyudmila Mazurok (KRO), Member of Legislative Assembly of Rostov Oblast (1994–present)
- Irina Pasechnikova (PGL), journalist
- German Petrov (Independent), Head of the North Caucasus Military District Headquarters Department
- Ivan Yevdokimov (Independent), Member of Legislative Assembly of Rostov Oblast (1994–present), agriculture businessman
- Vitaly Yermolenko (Independent), former Minister of Russia – Director of the Federal Centre for Land and Agro-Industrial Reform (1992–1993)

==== Results ====
Summary of the 17 December 1995 Russian legislative election in the Kamensk-Shakhtinsky constituency
Candidate	Party	Votes	%
Boris Danchenko (incumbent)	Agrarian Party	83,259	24.75%
Vitaly Yermolenko	Independent	60,059	17.85%
Lyudmila Mazurok	Congress of Russian Communities	54,148	16.10%
Ivan Yevdokimov	Independent	29,447	8.75%
Irina Pasechnikova	Pamfilova–Gurov–Lysenko	22,688	6.74%
Vladimir Gavrilov	Russian All-People's Movement	21,508	6.39%
Aleksandr Kasyanov	Liberal Democratic Party	18,611	5.53%
German Petrov	Independent	12,184	3.62%
against all		25,933	7.71%
Total		336,372	100%

=== 1999 ===
==== Declared candidates ====
- Nikolay Astapov (Nikolayev–Fyodorov Bloc), brick factory director
- Boris Danchenko (CPRF), incumbent Member of State Duma (1994–present)
- Yevgeny Fayustov (LDPR), kolkhoz chairman
- Igor Koryagin (Independent), industrial association executive
- Sergey Mrykhin (Independent), deputy director of the North Caucasus Academy of Public Administration Rostov Law Institute
- Irina Pasechnikova (SPS), journalist, 1995 PGL candidate for this seat
- Yevgeny Stupak (Independent), Deputy Chief of the North Caucasus Railway
- Valery Titarenko (Independent), disabled rights nonprofit chairman
- Vladimir Vasilevsky (DN), militsiya officer
- Aleksandr Zelenkov (Independent), coal processing plant foreman

==== Did not file ====
- Nikolay Kolesnikov (Independent), agriculture businessman
- Vasily Krasulin (RSP), agriculture businessman
- Vitaly Linnik (NDR), Member of State Duma (1996–present)
- Aleksey Martynov (Independent)
- Valery Nadezhdin (Independent)
- Gennady Pigunov (For Civil Dignity), businessman
- Viktor Rudometov (Stalin Bloc), coal miner
- Mikhail Sholokhov (Independent), chief consultant to the National Sholokhov Museum-Reserve
- Anatoly Skorotenko (Independent)
- Nikolay Tsygankov (Independent)
- Vyacheslav Vasilenko (Independent), First Deputy Minister of Agriculture of Rostov Oblast (1996–present)
- Yevgeny Yevchenko (KRO-Boldyrev)

==== Results ====
Summary of the 19 December 1999 Russian legislative election in the Kamensk-Shakhtinsky constituency
Candidate	Party	Votes	%
Boris Danchenko (incumbent)	Communist Party	76,825	25.03%
Yevgeny Stupak	Independent	52,579	17.13%
Igor Koryagin	Independent	46,931	15.29%
Irina Pasechnikova	Union of Right Forces	29,079	9.47%
Yevgeny Fayustov	Liberal Democratic Party	24,744	8.06%
Nikolay Astapov	Andrey Nikolayev and Svyatoslav Fyodorov Bloc	13,247	4.32%
Aleksandr Zelenkov	Independent	12,914	4.21%
Sergey Mrykhin	Independent	8,663	2.82%
Vladimir Vasilevsky	Spiritual Heritage	6,676	2.17%
Valery Titarenko	Independent	4,938	1.61%
against all		25,490	8.30%
Total		306,975	100%

=== 2003 ===
==== Declared candidates ====
- Boris Danchenko (CPRF), incumbent Member of State Duma (1994–present)
- Sergey Khoroshilov (Independent), nonprofit chairman
- Vladimir Litvinov (United Russia), Member of State Duma (2000–present)
- Aleksey Martynov ((ORP Rus'), phytosanitary certification specialist, 1999 candidate for this seat
- Sergey Shatsky (Independent), ecological centre director

==== Withdrawn candidates ====
- Vladislav Govorovsky (Independent), senior bailiff

==== Did not file ====
- Vladimir Kishko (RPP-PSS), pensioner
- Valery Ponkratov (Independent), pensioner

==== Results ====
Summary of the 7 December 2003 Russian legislative election in the Kamensk-Shakhtinsky constituency
Candidate	Party	Votes	%
Vladimir Litvinov	United Russia	148,188	53.93%
Boris Danchenko (incumbent)	Communist Party	45,492	16.56%
Sergey Khoroshilov	Independent	33,465	12.18%
Sergey Shatsky	Independent	9,240	3.36%
Aleksey Martynov	United Russian Party Rus'	5,503	2.00%
against all		28,441	10.35%
Total		274,796	100%

=== 2005 ===
==== Declared candidates ====
- Viktor Kolomeytsev (Independent), former Member of State Duma (2000–2003)
- Artyom Mekhtibekov (Independent), undergraduate student
- Oleg Mikheyev (Independent), construction businessman
- Vadim Varshavsky (Independent), billionaire businessman

==== Withdrawn candidates ====
- Nikolay Kolesnikov (Independent), Member of Donetsk City Duma, agriculture businessman, 1999 candidate for this seat

==== Did not file ====
- Vladimir Grishin (Independent), aide to State Duma member
- Arkady Pavlinov (Independent), community activist
- Vladimir Shlyakhtin (Independent), insurance executive
- Aleksandr Zhukov (Independent), senior repairman

==== Declined ====
- Boris Danchenko (CPRF), former Member of State Duma (1994–2003)

==== Results ====
Summary of the 9 October 2005 by-election in the Kamensk-Shakhtinsky constituency
Candidate	Party	Votes	%
Vadim Varshavsky	Independent	95,818	46.79%
Oleg Mikheyev	Independent	55,003	26.86%
Viktor Kolomeytsev	Independent	26,411	12.89%
Artyom Mekhtibekov	Independent	3,942	1.92%
against all		17,677	8.63%
Total		204,762	100%
