= Belaya Kalitva constituency =

Constituency of the State Duma of the Russian Federation

Belaya Kalitva single-member constituency
- Constituency of the Russian State Duma
- Deputy: Aslan Huade; United Russia
- Federal subject: Rostov Oblast
- Districts: Belokalitvinsky, Bokovsky, Chertkovsky, Donetsk, Kamensk-Shakhtinsky, Kamensky, Kasharsky, Krasnosulinsky, Millerovsky, Milyutinsky, Oblivsky, Sholokhovsky, Sovetsky, Tarasovsky, Tatsinsky, Verkhnedonskoy, Zverevo
- Voters: 508,715 (2026)

The Belaya Kalitva constituency (No.155 (Note: No.142 in 1995-2007, No.153 in 2016–2026)) is a Russian legislative constituency in Rostov Oblast. The constituency covers mostly rural and industrial coal-mining northern Rostov Oblast, including the cities Belaya Kalitva, Donetsk, Kamensk-Shakhtinsky and Millerovo.

The constituency has been represented since 2026 by United Russia deputy Aslan Huade, former Chief of the Investigative Committee of Russia Regional Office, who won the open seat after one-term United Russia incumbent Nikolay Goncharov unsuccessfully sought re-election on the party list.

== Boundaries ==
1995–2007: Bagayevsky District, Belaya Kalitva, Belokalitvinsky District, Konstantinovsky District, Novocherkassk, Oktyabrsky District, Semikarakorsky District, Ust-Donetsky District, Yegorlyksky District, Zernogradsky District
The constituency was created after the 1995 redistricting when Rostov Oblast gained seventh district. This seat was based in central Rostov Oblast, stretching from Belaya Kalitva in the north to Yegorlykskaya in the south, which previously were parts of Kamensk-Shakhtinsky (Belaya Kalitva), Shakhty (north-central part), Taganrog (Novocherkassk), Volgodonsk (south-central part) and Rostov (southern part) constituencies.

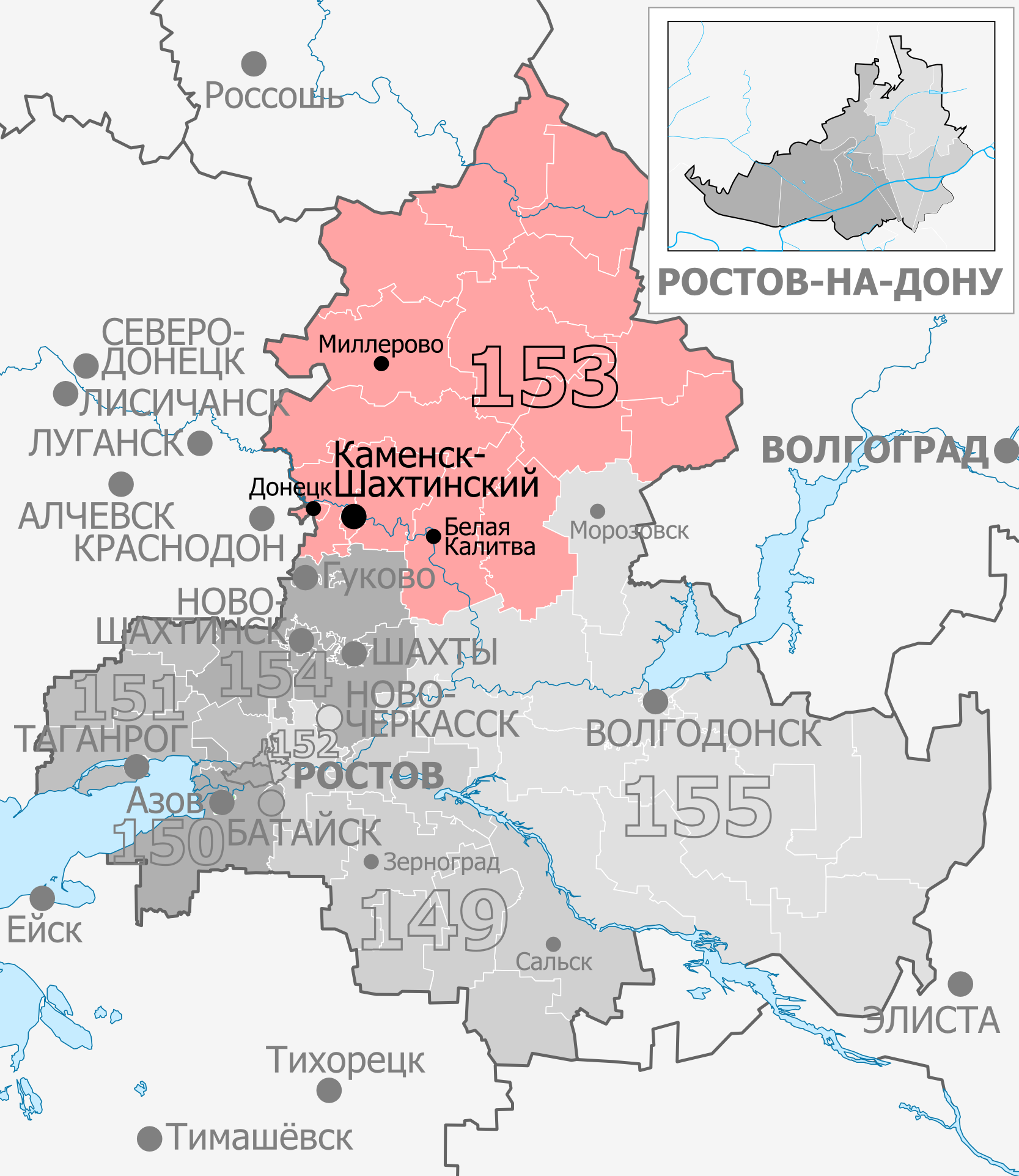
Constituency boundaries from 2016 to 2026

2016–2026: Belokalitvinsky District, Bokovsky District, Chertkovsky District, Donetsk, Kamensk-Shakhtinsky, Kamensky District, Kasharsky District, Millerovsky District, Milyutinsky District, Oblivsky District, Sholokhovsky District, Sovetsky District, Tarasovsky District, Tatsinsky District, Verkhnedonskoy District
The constituency was re-created for the 2016 election and retained only Belaya Kalitva and Belokalitvinsky District, losing Novocherkassk to Southern constituency, Oktyabrsky District – to Shakhty constituency, Konstantinovsky,Semikarakorsky and Ust-Donetsky districts – to Volgodonsk constituency, Bagayevsky, Yegorlyksky and Zernogradsky districts – to Rostov constituency. This seat instead took almost all of the dissolved Kamensk-Shakhtinsky constituency, except Morozovsky District.

2026–present: Belokalitvinsky District, Bokovsky District, Chertkovsky District, Donetsk, Kamensk-Shakhtinsky, Kamensky District, Kasharsky District, Krasnosulinsky District, Millerovsky District, Milyutinsky District, Oblivsky District, Sholokhovsky District, Sovetsky District, Tarasovsky District, Tatsinsky District, Verkhnedonskoy District, Zverevo
Following the 2025 redistricting Rostov Oblast lost one of its seven constituencies, so all the remaining seats saw major changes. The constituency retained all of its former territory and was pushed to the south-west into Eastern Donbass, gaining coal-mining Gukovo, Zverevo and Krasnosulinsky District from the dissolved Shakhty constituency.

== Members elected ==
Election	Member	Party
1995	Igor Bratishchev	Communist Party
1999	Vladimir Averchenko (Note: appointed Head of Rosstroy in March 2004)	Independent
2003	Vladimir Averchenko	People's Party
2004	Fyodor Shvalev	United Russia
2007	Proportional representation - no election by constituency	
2011	Proportional representation - no election by constituency	
2016	Aleksandr Sholokhov	United Russia
2021	Nikolay Goncharov	United Russia
2026	Aslan Huade	United Russia

== Election results ==
=== 1995 ===
Summary of the 17 December 1995 Russian legislative election in the Belaya Kalitva constituency
Candidate	Party	Votes	%
Igor Bratishchev (incumbent) (Note: redistricted from Rostov constituency)	Communist Party	88,884	26.67%
Sergey Shapovalov	Independent	60,624	18.19%
Valentina Cherevatenko	Independent	35,178	10.56%
Viktor Ratiyev	Russian All-People's Movement	32,796	9.84%
Vladimir Kuznetsov	Agrarian Party	25,947	7.79%
Sergey Tyukavkin	Liberal Democratic Party	17,194	5.16%
Roman Tsykora	Party of Workers' Self-Government	12,694	3.81%
Aleksandr Ovchinnikov	Ivan Rybkin Bloc	12,670	3.80%
Vasily Bodlo	Independent	6,112	1.83%
against all		31,877	9.57%
Total		333,239	100%

=== 1999 ===
Summary of the 19 December 1999 Russian legislative election in the Belaya Kalitva constituency
Candidate	Party	Votes	%
Vladimir Averchenko	Independent	121,082	37.90%
Igor Bratishchev (incumbent)	Movement in Support of the Army	66,439	20.79%
Valentina Cherevatenko	Independent	42,620	13.34%
Vasily Mokrikov	Independent	23,324	7.30%
Vladimir Shevtsov	Liberal Democratic Party	13,132	4.11%
Aleksandra Pyatakova	Independent	10,884	3.41%
against all		36,433	11.40%
Total		319,512	100%

=== 2003 ===
Results by district: Vladimir Averchenko: 30–40% 40–50% 60–70%; Valentin Shukshunov: 30–40% 40–50%

Summary of the 7 December 2003 Russian legislative election in the Belaya Kalitva constituency
Candidate	Party	Votes	%
Vladimir Averchenko (incumbent)	People's Party	93,438	34.27%
Valentin Shukshunov	Independent	75,678	27.76%
Yevgeny Volgunin	Communist Party	27,476	10.08%
Aleksey Averchenko	Independent	18,460	6.77%
Sergey Pryadilnikov	Liberal Democratic Party	9,767	3.58%
Yury Kholodov	Independent	6,492	2.38%
Pyotr Moroz	United Russian Party Rus'	3,239	1.19%
against all		31,774	11.65%
Total		272,797	100%

=== 2004 ===
Summary of the 19 December 2004 by-election in the Belaya Kalitva constituency
Candidate	Party	Votes	%
Fyodor Shvalev	United Russia	142,470	59.35%
Viktor Kolomeytsev	Independent	53,094	22.11%
Nikolay Kolomiytsev	Independent	12,849	5.35%
against all		23,406	9.75%
Total		240,047	100%

=== 2016 ===
Summary of the 18 September 2016 Russian legislative election in the Belaya Kalitva constituency
Candidate	Party	Votes	%
Aleksandr Sholokhov	United Russia	184,670	69.32%
Sergey Shapovalov	Communist Party	24,565	9.22%
Anatoly Borodachev	Liberal Democratic Party	22,497	8.44%
Sergey Kosinov	A Just Russia	8,323	3.12%
Igor Katayev	Communists of Russia	7,997	3.00%
Vladimir Averchenko	Rodina	7,302	2.74%
Denis Chebotarev	Patriots of Russia	3,489	1.31%
Dmitry Korochensky	Civic Platform	2,079	0.78%
Total		266,401	100%

=== 2021 ===
Summary of the 17-19 September 2021 Russian legislative election in the Belaya Kalitva constituency
Candidate	Party	Votes	%
Nikolay Goncharov	United Russia	129,211	54.74%
Vitaly Abakumov	Communist Party	47,958	20.32%
Denis Chebotarev	A Just Russia — For Truth	19,598	8.30%
Marina Gogu	Party of Pensioners	13,690	5.80%
Artur Tsapenko	Liberal Democratic Party	11,734	4.97%
Andrey Klimov	New People	8,738	3.70%
Total		236,036	100%

=== 2026 ===
Summary of the 18-20 September 2026 Russian legislative election in the Belaya Kalitva constituency
Candidate	Party	Votes	%
Aslan Huade	United Russia	196,053	56.62%
Vitaly Abakumov	Communist Party	55,542	16.04%
Alina Yegorova	A Just Russia	27,650	7.98%
Denis Punda	Liberal Democratic Party	26,165	7.56%
Maksim Ilyinov	New People	20,466	5.91%
Daniil Bondarenko	Yabloko	16,311	4.71%
Total		346,291	100%
