= Chernovsky (rural locality) =

Chernovsky (Russian: Черновский; masculine), Chernovskaya (Черновская; feminine), or Chernovskoye (Черновское; neuter) is the name of several rural localities in Russia:

- Chernovsky, Republic of Bashkortostan, a village in Krasnoyarsky Selsoviet of Ufimsky District of the Republic of Bashkortostan
- Chernovsky, Oryol Oblast, a settlement in Titovsky Selsoviet of Shablykinsky District of Oryol Oblast
- Chernovsky, Oblivsky District, Rostov Oblast, a khutor in Nesterkinskoye Rural Settlement of Oblivsky District of Rostov Oblast
- Chernovsky, Sholokhovsky District, Rostov Oblast, a khutor in Kolundayevskoye Rural Settlement of Sholokhovsky District of Rostov Oblast
- Chernovsky, Ryazan Oblast, a settlement under the administrative jurisdiction of the work settlement of Yelatma, Kasimovsky District, Ryazan Oblast
- Chernovsky, Samara Oblast, a settlement in Volzhsky District of Samara Oblast
- Chernovsky, Volgograd Oblast, a khutor in Pristenovsky Selsoviet of Chernyshkovsky District of Volgograd Oblast
- Chernovskoye, Chelyabinsk Oblast, a selo under the administrative jurisdiction of the city of Miass, Chelyabinsk Oblast
- Chernovskoye, Kirov Oblast, a selo in Chernovsky Rural Okrug of Shabalinsky District of Kirov Oblast
- Chernovskoye, Leningrad Oblast, a logging depot settlement in Chernovskoye Settlement Municipal Formation of Slantsevsky District of Leningrad Oblast
- Chernovskoye, Bolsheboldinsky District, Nizhny Novgorod Oblast, a selo in Chernovskoy Selsoviet of Bolsheboldinsky District of Nizhny Novgorod Oblast
- Chernovskoye, Vachsky District, Nizhny Novgorod Oblast, a village in Filinsky Selsoviet of Vachsky District of Nizhny Novgorod Oblast
- Chernovskoye, Perm Krai, a selo in Bolshesosnovsky District of Perm Krai
- Chernovskaya, Ivanovo Oblast, a village in Pestyakovsky District of Ivanovo Oblast
- Chernovskaya, Vladimir Oblast, a village in Selivanovsky District of Vladimir Oblast
- Chernovskaya, Vologda Oblast, a village in Nizhneslobodsky Selsoviet of Vozhegodsky District of Vologda Oblast
