= Sholokhov (surname) =

Sholokhov is a surname. Notable people with this surname include:

- Mikhail Sholokhov (1905–1984), Russian writer
- Mikhail Mikhailovich Sholokhov (1935–2013), Russian biologist, son of the above
- Aleksandr Sholokhov (born 1962), Russian politician and biologist, son of the above
- Boris Sholokhov (1919–2003), Soviet artist
- Dmitry Sholokhov (born 1980), Belarus-American fashion designer and reality television contestant
- Pyotr Sholokhov, 20th-century Russian artist
- Sergei Sholokhov (born 1980), Russian footballer

== See also ==
- Olga Sholokhova
- Named for Mikhail Mikhailovich Sholokhov:
  - National Sholokhov Museum-Reserve, in Rostov, Russia
  - Sholokhov Moscow State University for Humanities
