= Sovetsky, Russia =

Sovetsky (Russian: Сове́тский; masculine), Sovetskaya (Сове́тская; feminine) or Sovetskoye (Сове́тское; neuter) is the name of several inhabited localities in Russia.

Urban localities

- Sovetsky, Khanty–Mansi Autonomous Okrug, a town in Sovetsky District of Khanty-Mansi Autonomous Okrug
- Sovetsky, Leningrad Oblast, a settlement of urban type in Vyborgsky District of Leningrad Oblast
- Sovetsky, Mari El Republic, an urban-type settlement in Sovetsky District of the Mari El Republic
- Sovetskoye, Saratov Oblast, a work settlement in Sovetsky District of Saratov Oblast

Rural localities

- Sovetsky, Republic of Adygea, a khutor in Maykopsky District of the Republic of Adygea
- Sovetsky, Kostroma Oblast, a settlement in Mezhevskoy District of Kostroma Oblast
- Sovetsky, name of several other rural localities
- Sovetskaya, Krasnodar Krai, a stanitsa in Sovetsky Rural Okrug of Novokubansky District of Krasnodar Krai
- Sovetskaya, Kurgan Oblast, a village in Shchuchansky District of Kurgan Oblast
- Sovetskaya, Rostov Oblast, a stanitsa in Sovetsky District of Rostov Oblast
- Sovetskaya, Stavropol Krai, a stanitsa in Kirovsky District of Stavropol Krai
- Sovetskoye, Altai Krai, a selo in Sovetsky District of Altai Krai
- Sovetskoye, Altai Republic, a selo in Choysky District of Altai Republic
- Sovetskoye, Belgorod Oblast, a selo in Alexeyevsky District of Belgorod Oblast
- Sovetskoye, name of several other rural localities

Historical names

- Sovetskoye, name of Zelenokumsk, a town in Stavropol Krai, from 1963 to 1965

Abolished inhabited localities

- Sovetsky, a former urban-type settlement in the Komi Republic; since 2002—a part of the town of Vorkuta
