= Tarasovsky =

Set index of articles associated with the same name

Tarasovsky (Russian: Тарасовский; masculine), Tarasovskaya (Тарасовская; feminine), or Tarasovskoye (Тарасовское; neuter) is the name of several rural localities in Russia:

- Tarasovsky, Kirov Oblast, a pochinok in Buysky Rural Okrug of Urzhumsky District of Kirov Oblast
- Tarasovsky, Rostov Oblast, a settlement in Tarasovskoye Rural Settlement of Tarasovsky District of Rostov Oblast
- Tarasovskoye, Leningrad Oblast, a village under the administrative jurisdiction of Primorskoye Settlement Municipal Formation in Vyborgsky District of Leningrad Oblast
- Tarasovskoye, Tver Oblast, a village in Vasyukovskoye Rural Settlement of Bezhetsky District of Tver Oblast
- Tarasovskoye, Vologda Oblast, a village in Orlovsky Selsoviet of Velikoustyugsky District of Vologda Oblast
- Tarasovskaya, Kargopolsky District, Arkhangelsk Oblast, a village in Pavlovsky Selsoviet of Kargopolsky District of Arkhangelsk Oblast
- Tarasovskaya, Krasnoborsky District, Arkhangelsk Oblast, a village in Telegovsky Selsoviet of Krasnoborsky District of Arkhangelsk Oblast
- Tarasovskaya, Ustyansky District, Arkhangelsk Oblast, a village in Dmitriyevsky Selsoviet of Ustyansky District of Arkhangelsk Oblast
- Tarasovskaya, Velsky District, Arkhangelsk Oblast, a village in Ust-Velsky Selsoviet of Velsky District of Arkhangelsk Oblast
- Tarasovskaya, Komi Republic, a village in Loyma Selo Administrative Territory of Priluzsky District of the Komi Republic
- Tarasovskaya, Babayevsky District, Vologda Oblast, a village in Pyazhozersky Selsoviet of Babayevsky District of Vologda Oblast
- Tarasovskaya, Baranovsky Selsoviet, Kaduysky District, Vologda Oblast, a village in Baranovsky Selsoviet of Kaduysky District of Vologda Oblast
- Tarasovskaya, Nikolsky Selsoviet, Kaduysky District, Vologda Oblast, a village in Nikolsky Selsoviet of Kaduysky District of Vologda Oblast
- Tarasovskaya, Razinsky Selsoviet, Kharovsky District, Vologda Oblast, a village in Razinsky Selsoviet of Kharovsky District of Vologda Oblast
- Tarasovskaya, Slobodskoy Selsoviet, Kharovsky District, Vologda Oblast, a village in Slobodskoy Selsoviet of Kharovsky District of Vologda Oblast
- Tarasovskaya, Tarnogsky District, Vologda Oblast, a village in Verkhovsky Selsoviet of Tarnogsky District of Vologda Oblast
- Tarasovskaya, Beketovsky Selsoviet, Vozhegodsky District, Vologda Oblast, a village in Beketovsky Selsoviet of Vozhegodsky District of Vologda Oblast
- Tarasovskaya, Maryinsky Selsoviet, Vozhegodsky District, Vologda Oblast, a village in Maryinsky Selsoviet of Vozhegodsky District of Vologda Oblast
