= Oblivsky =

Oblivsky (masculine), Oblivskaya (feminine), or Oblivskoye (neuter) may refer to:

- Oblivsky District, a district of Rostov Oblast, Russia
- Oblivsky (rural locality), a rural locality (a khutor) in Volgograd Oblast, Russia
- Oblivskaya, a rural locality (a stanitsa) in Rostov Oblast, Russia
