= Belokalitvinsky =

Belokalitvinsky (masculine), Belokalitvinskaya (feminine), or Belokalitvinskoye (neuter) may refer to:

- Belokalitvinsky District, a district of Rostov Oblast, Russia
- Belokalitvinskoye Urban Settlement, an administrative division and a municipal formation which the town of Belaya Kalitva and three rural localities in Belokalitvinsky District of Rostov Oblast, Russia are incorporated as
