= Bokovsky =

Bokovsky (masculine), Bokovskaya (feminine), or Bokovskoye (neuter) may refer to:

- Bokovsky District, a district of Rostov Oblast, Russia
- Bokovskaya, a rural locality (a stanitsa) in Rostov Oblast, Russia
