= Milyutinsky =

Milyutinsky (masculine), Milyutinskaya (feminine), or Milyutinskoye (neuter) may refer to:

- Milyutinsky District, a district of Rostov Oblast, Russia
- Milyutinsky (rural locality), a rural locality (a khutor) in Krasnodar Krai, Russia
- Milyutinskaya, a rural locality (a stanitsa) in Rostov Oblast, Russia
