= Mikhailovich (name) =

Mikhailovich, also spelled Mikhaylovich, is a name. People associated with the name include:

== Surname ==
- Aleksandr of Tver
- Grand Duke Alexander Mikhailovich of Russia
- Alexei Mikhailovich
- Grand Duke George Mikhailovich of Russia
- Count Michael Mikhailovich of Torby
- George Mikhailovich, Count Brasov
- Grand Duke Sergei Mikhailovich of Russia
- Roman Mikhailovich
- Grand Duke Nicholas Mikhailovich of Russia
- Grand Duke George Mikhailovich of Russia (1863–1919)
- Rostislav Mikhailovich
- Draja Mikhailovich

== Middle name ==
- Andrei Mikhailovich Driessen
- Sergey Mikhailovich Brin
- Mikhail Mikhailovich Golitsyn (disambiguation)
- Fyodor Mikhailovich Dostoyevsky
- Alexander Mikhailovich Ovechkin
- Sergei Mikhailovich Eisenstein
- Vyacheslav Mikhailovich Molotov
- Yakov Mikhailovich Sverdlov
- Yakov Mikhailovich Yurovsky
- Sergei Mikhailovich Prokhudin-Gorskii
- Vladimir Mikhailovich Komarov
- Sergey Mikhailovich Mironov
- Viktor Mikhailovich Chebrikov
- Aleksandr Mikhailovich Lyapunov
- Vasili Mikhailovich Blokhin
- Sergei Mikhailovich Makarov
- Mikhail Mikhailovich Sholokhov
- Vladimir Mikhailovich Gundyayev
- Nikolai Mikhailovich Shvernik
- Akim Mikhailovich Tamiroff
- Alexander Mikhailovich Zverev
- Alexander Mikhailovich Vasilyevski
- Victor Mikhailovich Kalashnikov
- Mikhail Mikhailovich Kasyanov
- Viktor Mikhailovich Vasnetsov
- Nikolay Mikhailovich Kharitonov
- Grigory Mikhailovich Semenov
- Evgeny Mikhailovich Lifshitz
- Dmitry Mikhailovich Golitsyn (disambiguation)
- Viktor Mikhailovich Chernov
- Alexander Mikhailovich Prokhorov
- Mikhail Mikhailovich Zoshchenko
- Vyacheslav Mikhailovich Mirilashvili
- Vsevolod Mikhailovich Garshin

=== Mikhaylovich ===
- Boris Mikhaylovich Kustodiev
- Mikhail Mikhaylovich Gromov
- Aleksandr Mikhaylovich Raskatov
- Aleksandr Mikhaylovich Prokhorov

=== Fictional characters ===
- Aleksei Mikhailovich Sytsevich
