= Nikolay Goncharov =

Russian politician (born 1984)

- Николай Гончаров
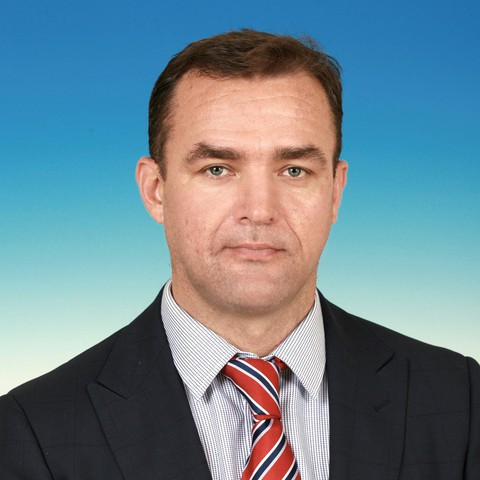
- official portrait, circa 2021

Member of the State Duma for Rostov Oblast
- Incumbent
- Assumed office 12 October 2021
- Preceded by: Aleksandr Sholokhov
- Constituency: Belaya Kalitva (No. 153)

Personal details
- Born: 13 January 1984 (age 42) Verkhnemakeevka, Kasharsky District, Rostov Oblast Russian SFSR, Soviet Union
- Party: United Russia
- Education: Southern Federal University

Nikolay Alexandrovich Goncharov (Russian: Гончаров, Николай Александрович; born 13 January 1984, Verkhnemakeevka, Kasharsky District) is a Russian political figure and a deputy of the 8th State Duma.

From 2006 to 2010, he worked as an assistant prosecutor and a lawyer. In 2010 he was appointed the CEO of "Donskoy Khleb". In 2014 he was elected deputy of the Assembly of deputies of the Kasharsky District of the 5th convocation. In September 2021, he was elected to the 8th State Duma from the Belokalitvinsky District constituency.

== Sanctions ==
He was sanctioned by the UK government in 2022 in relation to the Russo-Ukrainian War.
