= Chernaya Balka =

Russian botanical park

Chernaya Balka is a Russian botanical park. It is one of the Protected areas of Russia. It is a zakaznik and was created on September 22, 1977. The main population centers are Bogatov, Belaya Kalitva, village Kakichev. The monument has value for soil-protection, water security and erosion control. It plays environmental, scientific, recreational and educational roles.

== Geography ==
It is located on the right bank of the river Seversky Donets, southwest Bogatov, Rostov Oblast. It occupies 212,67 hectares.

The terrains is forest steppe. The soil type is south chernozem. The most typical relief is a ridge-hollow. The site is a highly ramified beam web, located in a Chernaya Balka that flows directly into the valley of Seversky Donets.

== Flora and fauna ==
Twenty species of trees and over one hundred species of herbaceous plants occupy the park.
