= Chernovsky =

Chernovsky (masculine), Chernovskaya (feminine), or Chernovskoye (neuter) may refer to:

- Chernovsky Administrative District, an administrative district of the city of Chita, Russia
- Chernovsky (rural locality) (Chernovskaya, Chernovskoye), name of several rural localities in Russia
