= Avilova Cave =

- Авилова пещера
- Location within Rostov Oblast Location within European Russia
- Location: Belokalitvinsky District, Rostov Oblast, Russia
- Coordinates: 48°11′N 40°48′E

Avilova Cave (Russian: Ави́лова пеще́ра, romanized: Avilova peshchera) is the cave that is situated in Avilovy Mountains in Belokalitvinsky District in Rostov Oblast.

== Geography ==
Avilovy Mountains are part of Donets Ridge. They are situated on the bank of the river Kalitva.

== History ==
The cave is called after the name of the elder Avil. He used to live in Ryginskaya cave, but then he moved to this place. He got his fame because he had an ability to predict the future as people told. In Peter’s the Great times, in that region occurred a flood and Avil had been taking out of the cave. Nobody knows what had happened to him then.

There are caves and grooves looking as signs of living there, in the mountains. The majority of caves were destroyed by stone-throwers.

You need to traverse a narrow precipitous path to get to the cave. The shrubbery blocks the entrance. There is a small cave behind the shrubbery made with an iron instrument.
