= Martyn Brothers House =

- Дом братьев Мартын (Russian)
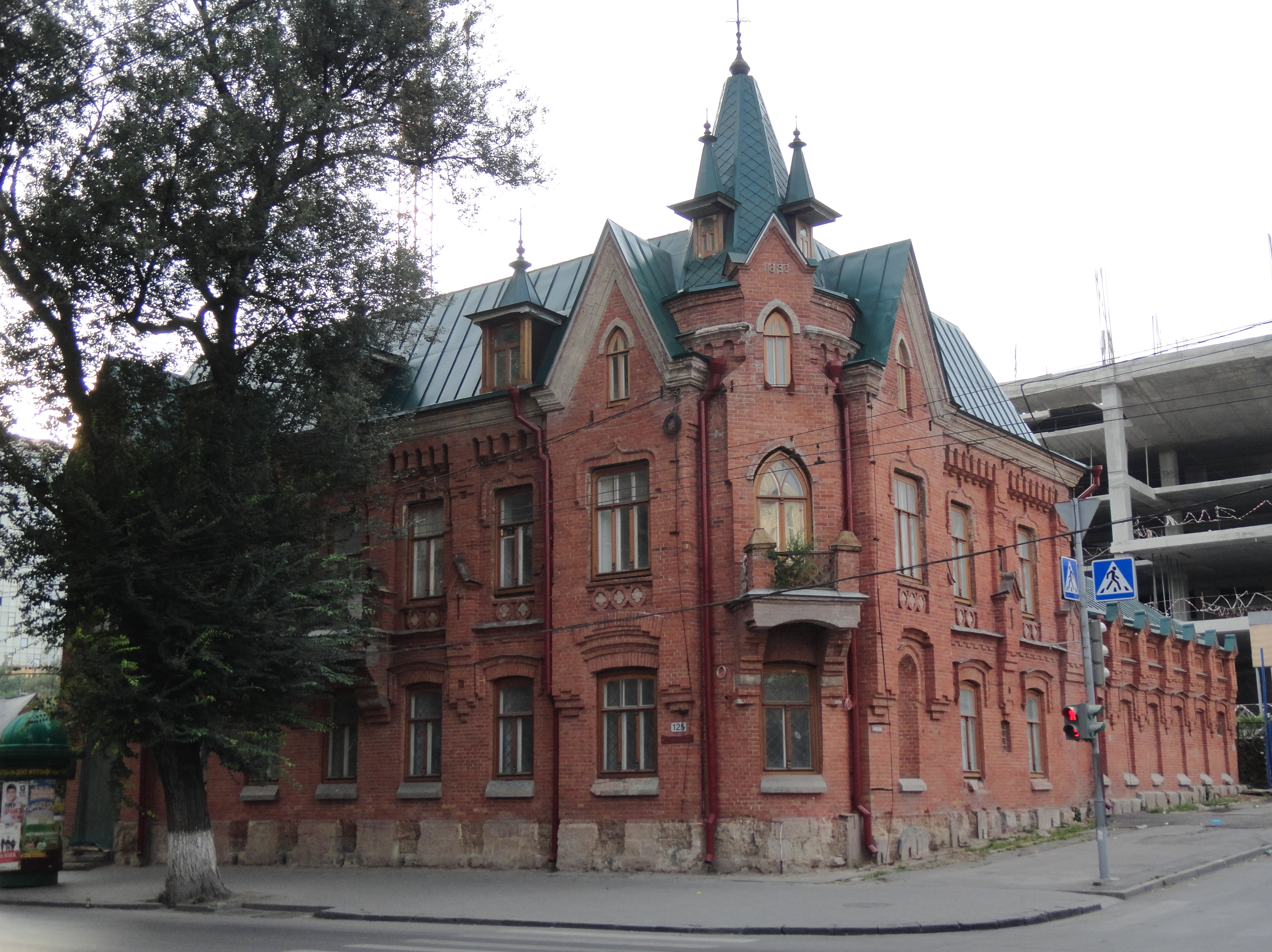

- Location within Rostov Oblast
- 47°13′34″N 39°44′10″E
- Location: 125 Bolshaya Sadovaya Street, Rostov-on-Don, Russia

History
- Built: 1893

Site notes
- Architect: Nikolai Sokolov
- Architectural style: Russian Gothic Revival eclecticism

The Martyn Brothers House (Russian: Дом братьев Мартын), also known as the Red Cottage (Russian: Красный домик), is a building in Rostov-on-Don, located at the intersection of Bolshaya Sadovaya Street and Fortress Lane. The building was built by architect Nikolai Sokolov in 1893, in the centre of the former Fortress of Saint Dimitry of Rostov. The first owner of the building was a British citizen, Ivan Romanovich Martyn. The Martyn Brothers' House has the status of an object of an object of cultural heritage of federal significance. The building currently houses the Sholokhov Centre, part of the National Sholokhov Museum-Reserve, and functions as an exhibition space and a venue for cultural and educational projects.

== History ==
The two-storey red brick house was built in 1893 to the design of Rostov architect Nikolai Matveyevich Sokolov. The house was built in the spirit of Russian Gothic Revival eclecticism, combining elements of Russian and German architecture.

In the 1910s, George Martyn was Consul of the United States, and had his reception room in the building. In the 1920s, the building was nationalized. On the ground floor were various institutions, and on the upper floor were communal apartments. After the Great Patriotic War, the building was renovated, during which time the roof windows were lost.

In 2007, the building was transferred to the National Sholokhov Museum-Reserve, and restoration works began. Repairs lasted between 2008 and 2014, with the building opening as the Sholokhov Centre on 22 May 2015, marking the 110th anniversary of Mikhail Sholokhov's birth, and Russia's Year of Literature. The centre provides exhibition space and a venue for cultural and educational projects. It hosts lectures, museum classes, creative meetings, and theme nights. Its first exhibition was "Traces of Cossack Antiquity", displaying artefacts from the Hermitage Museum's collections.
