= By-elections to the 4th Russian State Duma =

By-elections to the 4th State Duma of the Russian Federation were held to fill vacant seats in the State Duma between the 2003 election and the 2007 election.

| Constituency | Date | Former MP | Party | Cause | Winner | Party | Retained |
|---|---|---|---|---|---|---|---|
| Verkh-Isetsky No.162, Sverdlovsk Oblast | 14 March 2004 | None | None | Nobody received enough votes in the general election | Yevgeny Zyablitsev | Independent | Yes |
| Ulyanovsk No.181, Ulyanovsk Oblast | 14 March 2004 | None | None | Nobody received enough votes in the general election | Vacant. By-election declared invalid due to against all line receiving most votes. | | No |
| Eastern No.207, Saint Petersburg | 14 March 2004 | None | None | Nobody received enough votes in the general election | Aleksandr Morozov | Independent | No |
| Borzya No.187, Chita Oblast | 24 October 2004 | Yury Lossky | Independent | Death | Yevgeny Blokhin | Independent | Yes |
| Ulyanovsk No.181, Ulyanovsk Oblast | 5 December 2004 | None | None | Nobody received enough votes in the previous by-election | Yury Kogan | Liberal Democratic Party | No |
| Preobrazhensky No.199, Moscow | 5 December 2004 | Aleksandr Zhukov | United Russia | New post | Vacant. By-election declared invalid due to low turnout. | | No |
| Belaya Kalitva No.142, Rostov Oblast | 19 December 2004 | Vladimir Averchenko | People's Party | New post | Fyodor Shvalev | United Russia | No |
| Bryansk No.66, Bryansk Oblast | 24 April 2005 | Nikolay Denin | United Russia | New post | Vacant. By-election declared invalid due to low turnout. | | No |
| Kamensk-Shakhtinsky No.144, Rostov Oblast | 9 October 2005 | Vladimir Litvinov | United Russia | Death | Vadim Varshavsky | Independent | No |
| Preobrazhensky No.199, Moscow | 4 December 2005 | None | None | Nobody received enough votes in the previous by-election | Sergey Shavrin | United Russia | Yes |
| Universitetsky No.201, Moscow | 4 December 2005 | Mikhail Zadornov | Yabloko | New post | Stanislav Govorukhin | United Russia | No |
| Kalininsky No.183, Chelyabinsk Oblast | 25 December 2005 | Mikhail Yurevich | People's Party | New post | Dmitry Yeryomin | United Russia | No |
| Bryansk No.66, Bryansk Oblast | 12 March 2006 | None | None | Nobody received enough votes in the previous by-election | Viktor Malashenko | United Russia | Yes |
| Medvedkovo No.196, Moscow | 12 March 2006 | Georgy Boos | United Russia | New post | Leonid Govorov | United Russia | Yes |
| Sakhalin No.160, Sakhalin Oblast | 8 October 2006 | Ivan Zhdakayev | Communist Party | Death | Svetlana Ivanova | Communist Party | Yes |
| Ust-Orda Buryat No.220, Ust-Orda Buryat Autonomous Okrug | 8 October 2006 | Valery Kuzin | Independent | Death | Valery Maleyev | United Russia | No |
