= Aleksandr Sholokhov =

Russian politician and museum director

- Александр Шолохов
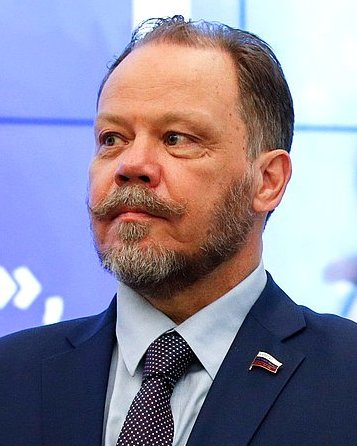

Member of the State Duma (Party List Seat)
- Incumbent
- Assumed office 12 October 2021

Member of the State Duma for Rostov Oblast
- In office 5 October 2016 – 12 October 2021
- Preceded by: constituency re-established
- Succeeded by: Nikolay Goncharov
- Constituency: Belaya Kalitva (No. 153)

Personal details
- Born: 25 January 1962 (age 63); Moscow, RSFSR, USSR
- Political party: United Russia
- Spouse: Valeriya Vladimirovna Sholokhova
- Children: 2 sons
- Parents: Mikhail Mikhailovich Sholokhov (father); Valentina Ismailovna Sholokhova (mother)
- Relatives: Mikhail Sholokhov (grandfather)
- Education: Rostov State University; Moscow State University (Ph.D.)
- Occupation: Biologist

Aleksandr Mikhailovich Sholokhov (Russian: Александр Михайлович Шолохов; born 25 January 1962 in Moscow) is a Russian politician and biologist. Member of the 7th State Duma, Director of the National Sholokhov Museum-Reserve in 2001–2016, Candidate of Biological Sciences.

He is a grandson of novelist Mikhail Sholokhov and son of Mikhail Mikhailovich Sholokhov.

== Biography ==
Aleksandr Mikhailovich Sholokhov was born on 25 January 1962 in Moscow. He graduated from the Biology and Soil Faculty of Rostov State University in 1984 and later worked as a lecturer there.

He also studied at the graduate school of Moscow State University. Candidate of Biological Sciences (1989).

Since 1989 he was an employee of the National Sholokhov Museum-Reserve. In 1999 he graduated from Rostov State Economic University, majoring in law. In 2001–2016 he was the Director of National Sholokhov Museum-Reserve.

In 2003–2008 he was a deputy of the Legislative Assembly of Rostov Oblast.

In 2014 he became a member the Presidium of the Council under the President of the Russian Federation for Culture and Art. In 2016 he was elected President of the Russian Committee of the International Union of Museums.

On 18 September 2016 he was elected a deputy of the 7th State Duma. He is a member of United Russia and a deputy chairman of the State Duma Committee on Culture.

He was awarded the Order of Honour, Medal of the Order "For Merit to the Fatherland".
