= Boris Sholokhov =

Soviet artist

Boris Anatolyevich Sholokhov (Russian: Бори́с Анато́льевич Шо́лохов; 1919–2003) was a Socialist realism artist from the Soviet Union, a student of Pyotr Ivanovich Sholokhov, and a candidate of art criticism, whose artworks are stored in the Tretyakov Gallery in Moscow.

== Biography ==
Boris Anatolyevich Sholokhov was born in Borisoglebsk in the Voronezh Oblast. He was a gifted Russian artist - master of the portrait, landscape, and the nude genre.

Originally, he studied under the leadership of his uncle, the renowned artist of the 1930s Pyotr Ivanovich Sholokhov. Boris Anatolyevich began his studies at the St. Petersburg Academy of Arts, and ended his studies at the Moscow Surikov State Academic Institute of Fine Arts with teachers including S. Chuykov, V. Yakovlev, A. Gritsaya, and also teachers D. Corin and D. Oreshnikov.

Boris Anatolyevich taught at Moscow State University of Printing Arts of I. Fedorov. The participant of many All-Union and personal exhibitions (since 1950).

Sholokhov's works are stored in the State Tretyakov Gallery in Moscow, in a collection of the Moscow Art Institute of Surikov, in the museum of children's camp "Artek" in Crimea, and in the art museums of Penza and Voronezh, and also - Borisoglebsk and Livadiya.

== Bibliography ==
"The Artist and Time" (2014): where he frankly tells about the time of participation in the Great Patriotic War, giving advice to beginner painters.
