= Sovetskoye, Belgorod Oblast =

Sovetskoye Советское
- Selo
- Location within Belgorod Oblast Location within Russia
- Coordinates: 50°20′N 39°00′E
- Country: Russia
- Region: Belgorod Oblast
- District: Alexeyevsky District
- Time zone: UTC+3:00

Sovetskoye (Russian: Совéтское) is a rural locality (a selo) and the administrative center of Sovetskoye Rural Settlement, Alexeyevsky District, Belgorod Oblast, Russia. The population was 1,006 as of 2010. There are 15 streets.

== Geography ==
Sovetskoye is located 47 km southeast of Alexeyevka (the district's administrative centre) by road. Zapolnoye is the nearest rural locality.
