= Milyutinskaya =

Rural locality in Rostov Oblast, Russia

Coordinates: 48°37′34″N 41°40′21″E

Milyutinskaya (Russian: Милютинская) is a rural locality (a stanitsa) and the administrative center of Milyutinsky District, Rostov Oblast, Russia. Population: 2,518 (2010 census); 2,747 (2002 census); 2,758 (1989 Soviet census).
