= Chernovsky, Republic of Bashkortostan =

Chernovsky Черновский
- Village
- Location within Bashkortostan Location within Russia
- Coordinates: 54°51′N 55°52′E
- Country: Russia
- Region: Bashkortostan
- District: Ufimsky District
- Time zone: UTC+5:00

Chernovsky (Russian: Черновский) is a rural locality (a village) in Krasnoyarsky Selsoviet, Ufimsky District, Bashkortostan, Russia. The population was 60 as of 2010. There are 5 streets.

== Geography ==
Chernovsky is located 23 km northwest of Ufa (the district's administrative centre) by road. Mudarisovo is the nearest rural locality.
