= Oblivsky (rural locality) =

Rural locality in Volgograd, Russia

Oblivsky Обливский
- Khutor
- Location within Volgograd Oblast Location within Russia
- Coordinates: 49°54′N 42°35′E
- Country: Russia
- Region: Volgograd Oblast
- District: Kumylzhensky District
- Time zone: UTC+4:00

Oblivsky (Russian: Обливский) is a rural locality (a khutor) in Kumylzhenskoye Rural Settlement, Kumylzhensky District, Volgograd Oblast, Russia. The population was 293 as of 2010. There are 9 streets.

== Geography ==
Oblivsky is located in forest steppe, on Khopyorsko-Buzulukskaya Plain, 4 km north of Kumylzhenskaya (the district's administrative centre) by road. Kumylzhenskaya is the nearest rural locality.
