= Pyotr Sholokhov =

Russian painter

Pyotr Ivanovich Sholokhov (Russian: Пётр Иванович Шолохов) was a Russian realist artist, who was a member of the Union of Russian Artists as well as the Association of Revolutionary Visual Artists. He was also a professor of Fine Arts, a graduate of Vkhutemas, and an apprentice of Russian realist artist Abram Arkhipov. Today many of his works are held in the State Tretyakov Gallery in Moscow. A museum under his name was opened in Borisoglebsk in the Voronezh Oblast. He is also the author of «From the Viewpoint of an Artist: Countrymen, Colleagues, and the Second World War» (М.2009).

== Biography ==
Pyotr Ivanovich Sholokhov was born on 5 October 1898 in Borisoglebsk in the Voronezh Oblast to a merchant family. From 1915-1920, he studied fine arts in Borisoglebsk. In 1920 he moved to Moscow and enrolled in Vkhutemas, where he was an apprentice to Favorsky and Pavlinov until 1923, later getting transferred to the Arkhipov's workshop. Sholokhov was an avid participant in republic and all-union exhibitions. In 1929 he became a member of the Association of Revolutionary Visual Artists. In 1959 and 1975, Sholokhov's personal exhibitions were held in Moscow. Sholokhov is an author of pictures of military theme and picturesque outlines in Yasnaya Polyana, in different places which are connected to the life of Leo Tolstoy and in Melikhovo where Anton Chekhov set his foot. Sholokhov was a teacher of drawing in Verhniy Karachan in the Gribanovsky district. In 1950 he visited Borisoglebsk, where he created many works capturing different parts of the city. Pyotr Ivanovich is known for the portrait genre, landscape, as well as still life. Many of his works are dedicated to landscapes of Borisoglebsk and its surroundings.

In 1941, Pyotr Ivanovich was drafted into the army, and while being at the front, he managed to paint decorations and portraits of generals, posters and nameplates on the graves of the perished. He was able to freely cite poetry of Vladimir Mayakovsky and Sergei Esenin, and argue on contemporary tendencies in the art world. In his free time, the artist painted military landscapes where he showed dugouts, burnt forests, and the remains of peasant's houses and roads.

Sholokhov was named «The singer of Borisoglebsk and its surroundings». In postwar years he worked on industrial themes, creating famous paintings such as «The Plant of Hammer and Sickle». Pyotr Ivanovich was a Professor of Art History in a studio of the publishing house «Pravda». In 1982 he donated more than 100 works to numerous art museums in Voronezh and Borisoglebsk. The paintings of this author are kept in the Tretyakov State Gallery in Moscow, as well as in Yasnaya Polyana, Melikhovo, and various museums in Serpukhov and Taganrog.

== Legacy ==
Pyotr Sholokhov was a highly-skilled painter of the socialist realism period, and he inspired other artists including his nephew Boris Anatolievich Sholokhov. His last personal exhibition took place in 1982 on Begovaya street in Moscow. While realism was largely abandoned in the West in the 20th century, the Soviet state devoted vast resources to supporting traditional landscape and portrait artists. In 2000, an art gallery under his name was opened in Borisoglebsk, in the Voronezh oblast. The art gallery is a branch of Etnographical museum and is located in an old mansion of a Russian merchant, rebuilt in recent times. In this gallery there are over 300 pictures, 70 of which are painted by Sholokhov. Art collector Alexei Ananyev sees Socialist Realism as a historical Russian style, inherited from such 19th-century masters as Ilya Repin. “There is a century-long academic tradition, which fortunately for this art has been transferred from one generation of painters to another and preserved." According to Ananyev, the “emotion” of realist painting distinguishes it from other modern movements of the twentieth century.
