= Bokovskaya =

Bokovskaya Боковская
- Stanitsa
- Interactive map of Bokovskaya
- Location of Bokovskaya Bokovskaya (Rostov Oblast)
- Coordinates: 49°13′20″N 41°50′01″E
- Country: Russia
- Federal subject: Rostov Oblast
- Administrative district: Bokovsky District
- Founded: 1866
- Elevation: 94 m (308 ft)

Population (2010 Census)
  - Total: 4,832
  - Estimate (2010): 4,832 (0%)
- Time zone: UTC+3 (MSK)
- Postal code: 346250
- OKTMO ID: 60607411101

Bokovskaya (Russian: Боковская) is a rural locality (a stanitsa) in Bokovsky District of Rostov Oblast, Russia, located on the Chir River 354 kilometers (220 mi) south of Rostov-on-Don. Population: 4,832 (2010 census); 5,040 (2002 census). It is also the administrative center of Bokovsky District.

== History ==
Before a stanitsa was established, there had already been a post station called Bokovskaya, which was first mentioned in official lists in 1873. At the end of the 19th century, the land near the Chir River was being quickly settled by Cossacks and peasants from other regions, although it was situated very far from any major cities.

According to the 1915 census, 395 people lived in the khutor of Bokov. There were two parish schools, a church and two mills. In 1918 the khutor changed its status to stanitsa.

== Landmarks ==
- St. John the Baptist Church
- Local History Museum of Bokovsky District
- "Heroes never perish" Memorial Complex

Also there are several archaeological sites around. The territory was first settled in the Neolithic Era, and many mounds have been preserved there. All of them are placed under state protection, as they are officially recognized as objects of cultural heritage of Russia
