= Chernovskoye, Perm Krai =

Chernovskoye Черновское
- Selo
- Location within Perm Krai Location within Russia
- Coordinates: 57°29′N 54°32′E
- Country: Russia
- Region: Perm Krai
- District: Bolshesosnovsky District
- Time zone: UTC+5:00

Chernovskoye (Russian: Черновское) is a rural locality (a selo) and the administrative center of Chernovskoye Rural Settlement, Bolshesosnovsky District, Perm Krai, Russia. The population was 1,661 as of 2021. There are 25 streets.

== Geography ==
Chernovskoye is located 22 km south of Bolshaya Sosnova (the district's administrative centre) by road. Osinovka is the nearest rural locality.
