= Sovetskoye, Altai Republic =

Sovetskoye Советское
- Village
- Location within Altai Republic Location within Russia
- Coordinates: 52°02′N 86°36′E
- Country: Russia
- Region: Altai Republic
- District: Choysky District
- Time zone: UTC+7:00

Sovetskoye (Russian: Советское) is a rural locality (a selo) in Choyskoye Rural Settlement of Choysky District, the Altai Republic, Russia. The population was 116 as of 2016.

== Geography ==
Sovetskoye is located east from Gorno-Altaysk, in the valley of the Isha River, 8 km northeast of Choya (the district's administrative centre) by road. Choya is the nearest rural locality.
