= Mikhail Mikhailovich Sholokhov =

Russian biologist

- Born: Mikhail Mikhailovich Sholokhov; Михаил Михайлович Шолохов; 23 May 1935; Moscow
- Died: 21 October 2013 (aged 78); Vyoshenskaya, Rostov Oblast
- Occupation: scientist

Mikhail Mikhailovich Sholokhov (Russian: Михаил Михайлович Шолохов; 23 May 1935, Moscow — 21 October 2013, Vyoshenskaya, Rostov Oblast) was a Russian scientist. Candidate of Biological Sciences, Honorary Professor of Sholokhov Moscow State University for Humanities.

== Biography ==
Mikhail Mikhailovich was born in the family of the famous writer Mikhail Alexandrovich Sholokhov on 23 May 1935 in Moscow. In 1960 he graduated with honors from the Biological Faculty of Moscow State University, majoring in ichthyology. He worked in the Commission for Nature Protection at the USSR Academy of Sciences in Moscow.

In 1972 Mikhail Sholokhov also graduated from the History and Philosophy Faculty of Rostov State University. He wrote a thesis on the topic "Methodological issues of analysis of the relationship between man and nature" in 1974. Later he taught philosophy at Rostov State University and was a teacher at Rostov Militia School. He was the head of Rostov branch of Moscow Law Academy of the Ministry of Internal Affairs of the USSR. In 1992 he retired in the rank of colonel.

Mikhail Mikhailovich wrote about himself in a such way:

By education I am a biologist. But after graduating from Moscow State University I became fascinated by philosophy and continued my postgraduate studies and became a teacher of philosophy at Rostov University. My father jokingly called me a philosopher from biology. And when I began working at Rostov Academy of the Ministry of Internal Affairs, he immediately in a letter to me demanded an explanation: "How should I call you now, Mikhail Mikhailovich, a philosopher from the police or better — a policeman from philosophy?"

In 1965 Mikhail Sholokhov and his parents took part in the Nobel festivities in Stockholm, when his father was awarded Nobel Prize for literature.

Since 1992, Mikhail Mikhailovich was the chief consultant of National Sholokhov Museum-Reserve, which in 2001―2016 was headed by his son, Aleksandr Sholokhov.

In 1990-1991 Mihail Mikhailovich was the first Ataman of the revived union of Don Cossacks.

In 2006-2008 he was a member of the Public Chamber under the President of the Russian Federation.

Laureate of Mikhail Sholokhov International Prize (2004).

In 2004 he wrote a book "About my father. Memories and Reflection of Years of Life", where a number of previously unknown letters by Sholokhov have been published. The book reveals the important aspects of the writer's personality and worldview and reproduces the dialogues between father and son, where they discuss social and historical issues.

Mikhail Mikhailovich Sholokhov died on 21 October 2013 in the village of Vyoshenskaya, Rostov Oblast.
