= Chernovskaya, Ivanovo Oblast =

Chernovskaya Черновская
- Village
- Location within Ivanovo Oblast Location within Russia
- Coordinates: 56°42′N 42°37′E
- Country: Russia
- Region: Ivanovo Oblast
- District: Pestyakovsky District
- Time zone: UTC+3:00

Chernovskaya (Russian: Черновская) is a rural locality (a village) in Pestyakovsky District, Ivanovo Oblast, Russia. Population: 13 (2010 census);

== Geography ==
This rural locality is located 3 kilometres (1.9 mi) from Pestyaki (the district's administrative centre), 107 kilometres (66 mi) from Ivanovo (capital of Ivanovo Oblast) and 324 kilometres (201 mi) from Moscow. Larikovka is the nearest rural locality.
