= Tarasovsky, Rostov Oblast =

Rural locality in Rostov Oblast, Russia

Coordinates: 48°43′40″N 40°21′26″E

Tarasovsky (Russian: Тарасовский) is a rural locality (a settlement) and the administrative center of Tarasovsky District, Rostov Oblast, Russia. Population: 9,017 (2010 census); 8,963 (2002 census); 8,542 (1989 Soviet census).
