= Oblivskaya =

Oblivskaya Обливская
- Stanitsa
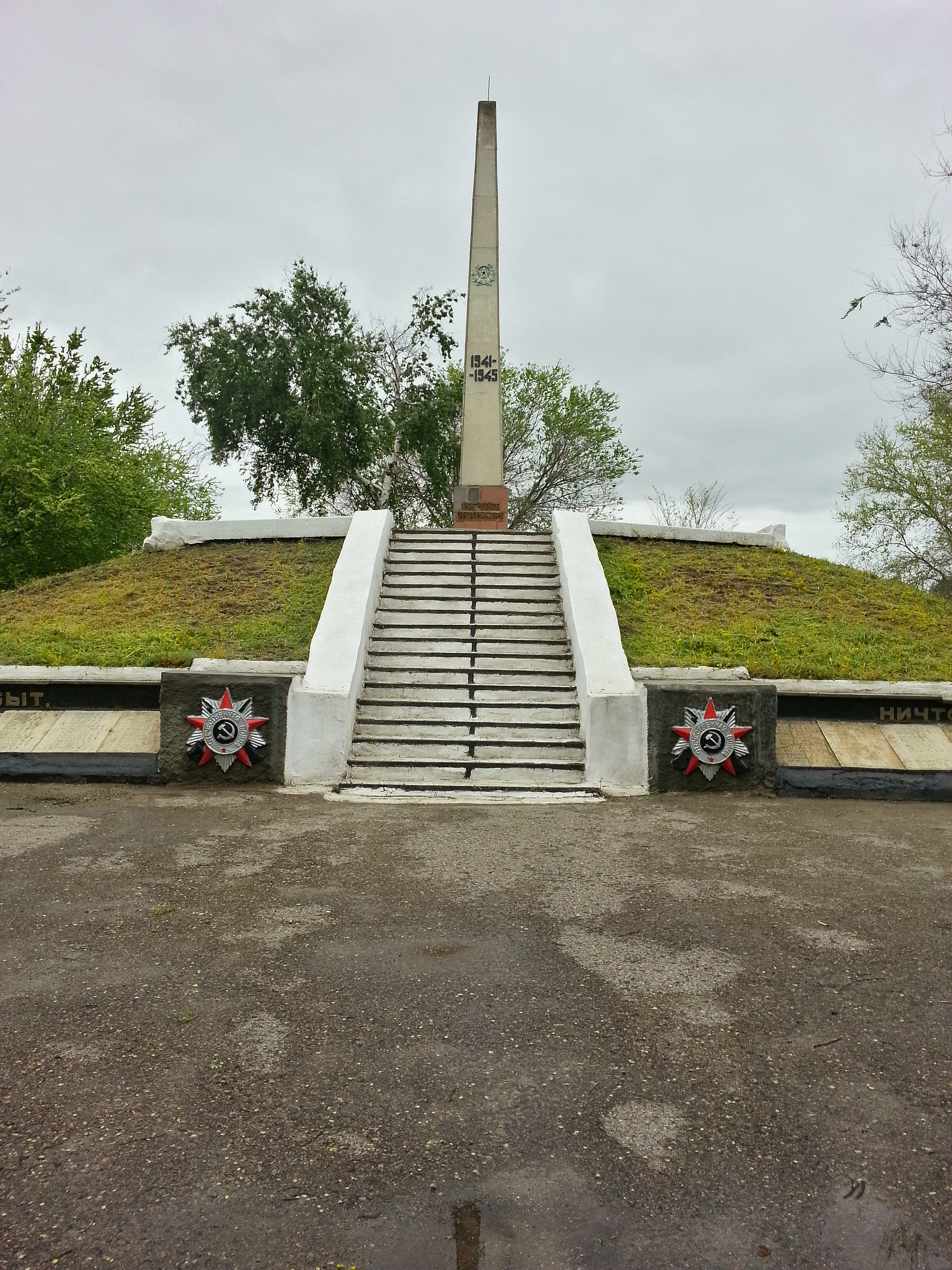

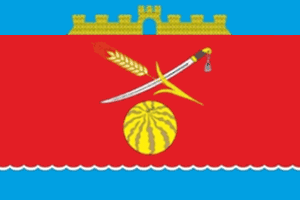
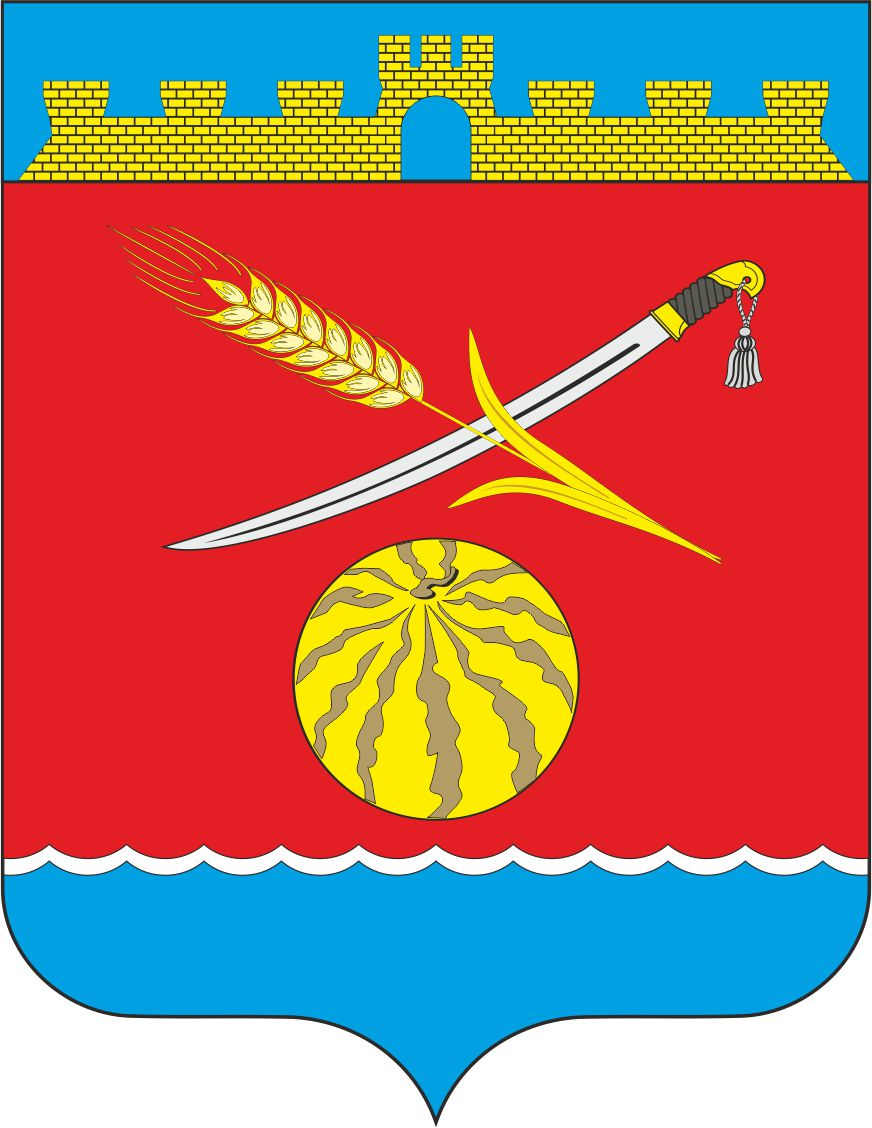
- Flag Coat of arms
- Interactive map of Oblivskaya
- Location of Oblivskaya Oblivskaya (Rostov Oblast)
- Coordinates: 48°32′12″N 42°29′39″E
- Country: Russia
- Federal subject: Rostov Oblast
- Administrative district: Oblivsky District
- Founded: 1744

Population (2010 Census)
  - Total: 9,908
  - Estimate (2010): 9,908 (0%)
- Time zone: UTC+3 (MSK)
- Postal code: 347141
- OKTMO ID: 60640420101

Oblivskaya (Russian: Обливская) is a rural locality (a stanitsa) in Oblivsky District of Rostov Oblast, Russia. Population: 9,908 (2010 census); 9,543 (2002 census). It is also the administrative center of Oblivsky District.

== History ==
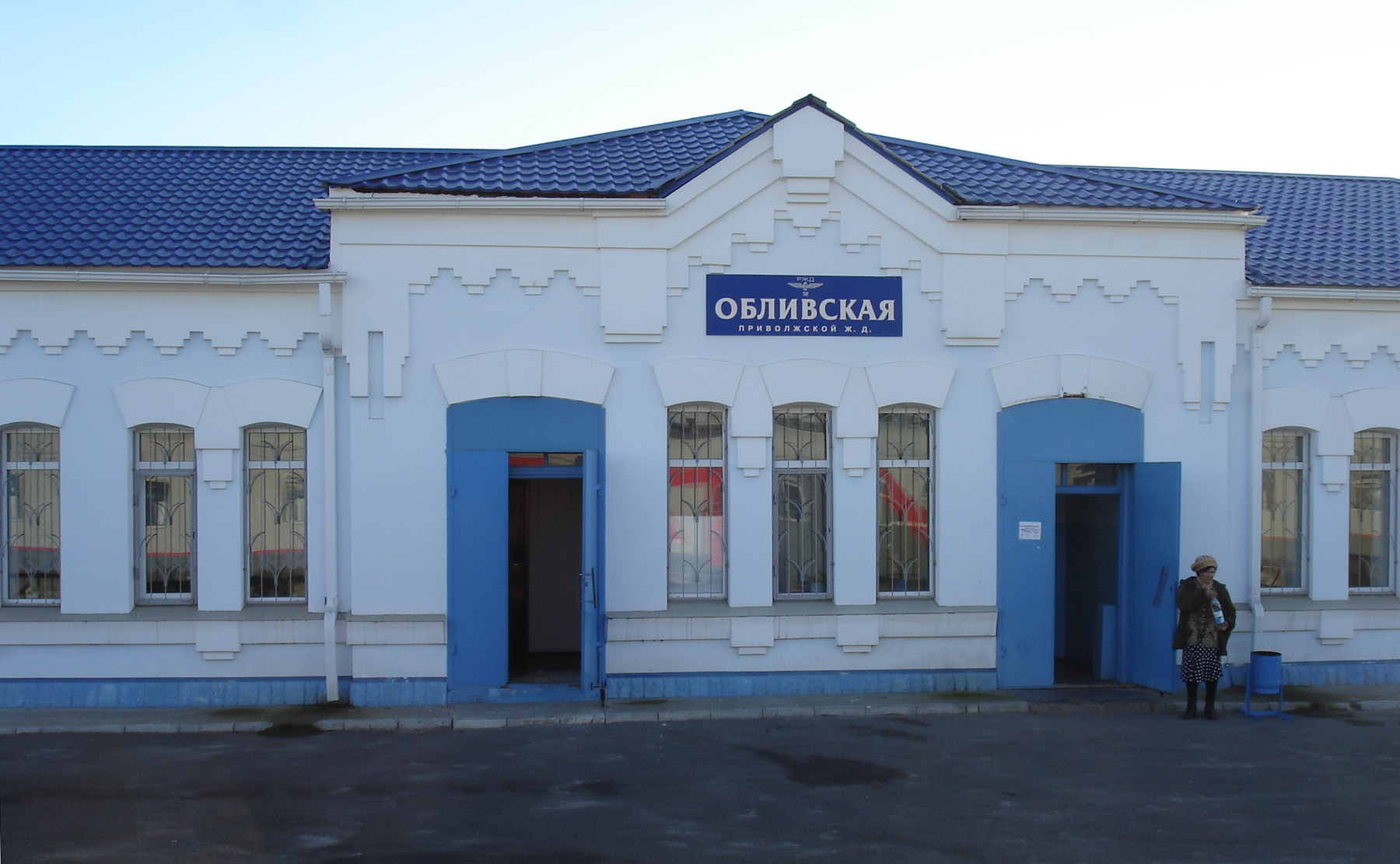
Oblivskaya railway station

It is believed that the khutor of Oblivy was first settled by Cossacks in 1744. In 1838 the settlement had 42 households.

The original territory of the khutor was surrounded by the Chir River and several lakes. In spring, during floods, the territory of the farm was cut off from the land with water, and sometimes the village itself was sometimes flooded. Over time the village was moved up to the hill. As of 1879, there were 80 households there.

In the 1860s, a Chapel was built here and later a parish school began to function, in which natural sciences, handicrafts, exact sciences, French and German languages were taught. In 1881 a post office was established in the village.

Before Russian Revolution of 1917 the stanitsa had a population of about 1500 people.

Oblivskaya was the site of hostilities in World War II. It was briefly occupied by Germans and later liberated on 31 December 1942.

== Places of interest ==
- Museum of local history
- St. Nicholas' Church, an architectural monument of the 19th century and an object of cultural heritage of Russia.
