= Sovetskaya, Rostov Oblast =

Rural locality in Rostov Oblast, Russia

Coordinates: 49°00′26″N 42°06′47″E

Sovetskaya (Russian: Советская) is a rural locality (a stanitsa) and the administrative centre of Sovetsky District, Rostov Oblast, Russia. Population: 2,279 (2010 census); 3,296 (2002 census);

Until 1957 it was named Chernyshevskaya.
