= Vyoshenskaya =

Place in Rostov Oblast, Russia

Vyoshenskaya Вёшенская
- Rural locality
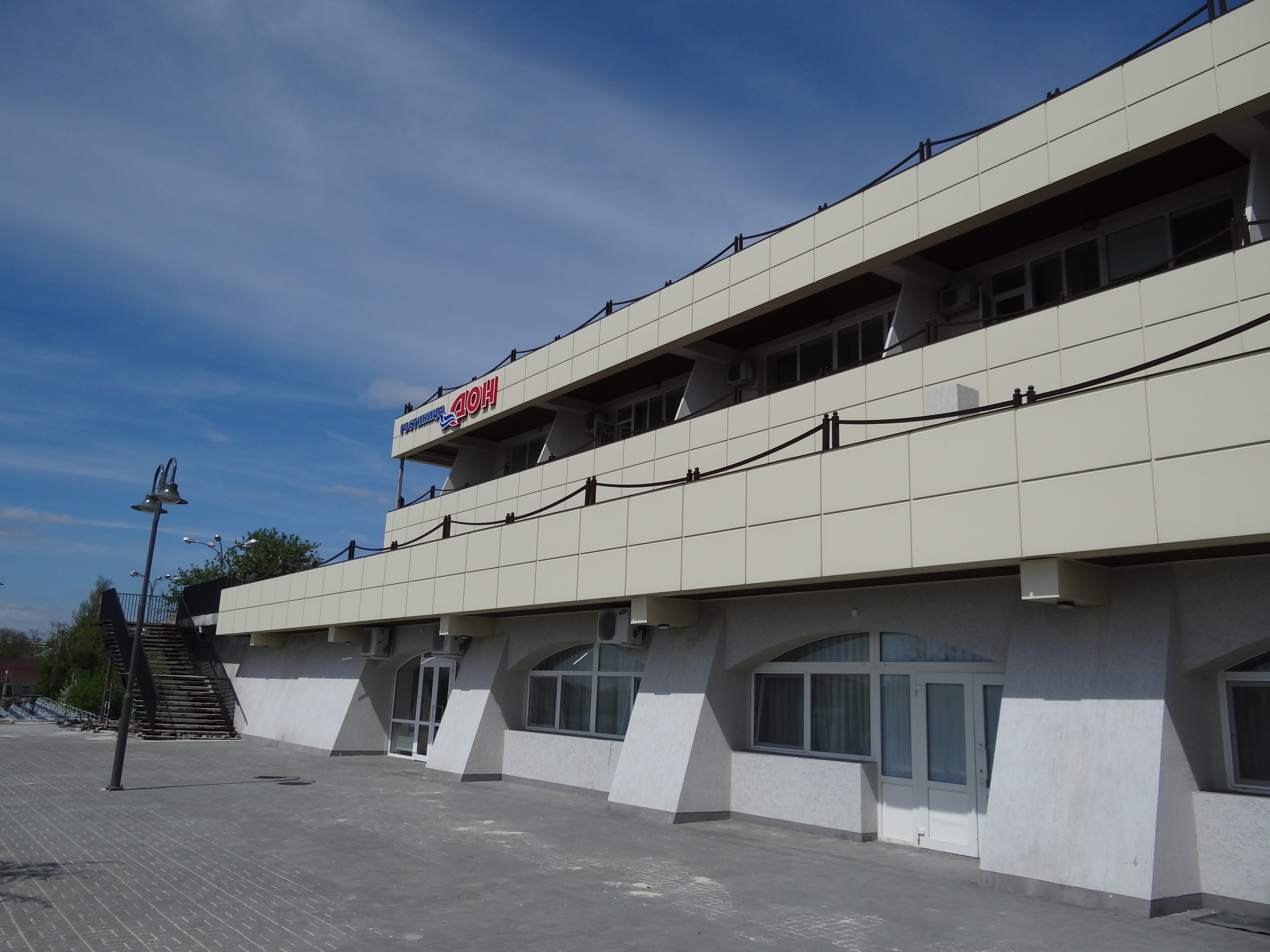
- Hotel "Don" (former building of the river station Vyoshenskaya)
- Interactive map of Vyoshenskaya
- Location of Vyoshenskaya Vyoshenskaya (Rostov Oblast)
- Coordinates: 49°38′N 41°43′E
- Country: Russia
- Federal subject: Rostov Oblast
- Administrative district: Sholokhovsky District
- First mentioned: 1672

Population (2010 Census)
  - Total: 9,261
  - Estimate (2010): 9,261 (0%)
- Time zone: UTC+3 (MSK)
- Postal code: 346270
- Dialing code: +7 86353
- OKTMO ID: 60659410101

Vyoshenskaya (Russian: Вёшенская, IPA: [ˈvʲɵʂɨnskəjə]), colloquially known as Vyoshki (Russian: Вёшки), is a rural locality (a stanitsa) and the administrative center of Sholokhovsky District of Rostov Oblast, Russia, located in the northern reaches of the Don River on its left bank. Population: 9,261 (2010 census); 9,317 (2002 census); 9,578 (1989 Soviet census).

== History ==
Local tradition asserts that the stanitsa was first mentioned in 1672.. However, a settlement called Veesky in the very same place is marked on a map of Southern Russia from Isaac Massa's book printed in 1638.

During the Russian Civil War in 1919, the Upper-Don Anti-Bolshevists operated from Vyoshenskaya. The Vyoshenskaya Uprising and its leader, Pavel Kudinov, are described in Sholokhov's novel And Quiet Flows the Don. The rebels had withdrawn from the White Army and joined the Bolsheviks, but rose in arms because of the Red Terror. They felt betrayed by the Bolsheviks who had promised that the Upper Don would be spared any military action or decossackization. The counter-revolutionaries then united with the Don Army. The uprising failed as the southern front collapsed. Sholokhov also described the conditions during those years in his collection of short stories Tales of the Don.

Due to the efforts of Sholokhov, a paved road was laid in 1963 between Vyoshenskaya and Millerovo. In 1985, a bridge was built connecting Vyoshenskaya with the stanitsa of Bazkovskaya, on the opposite bank.

== Culture ==
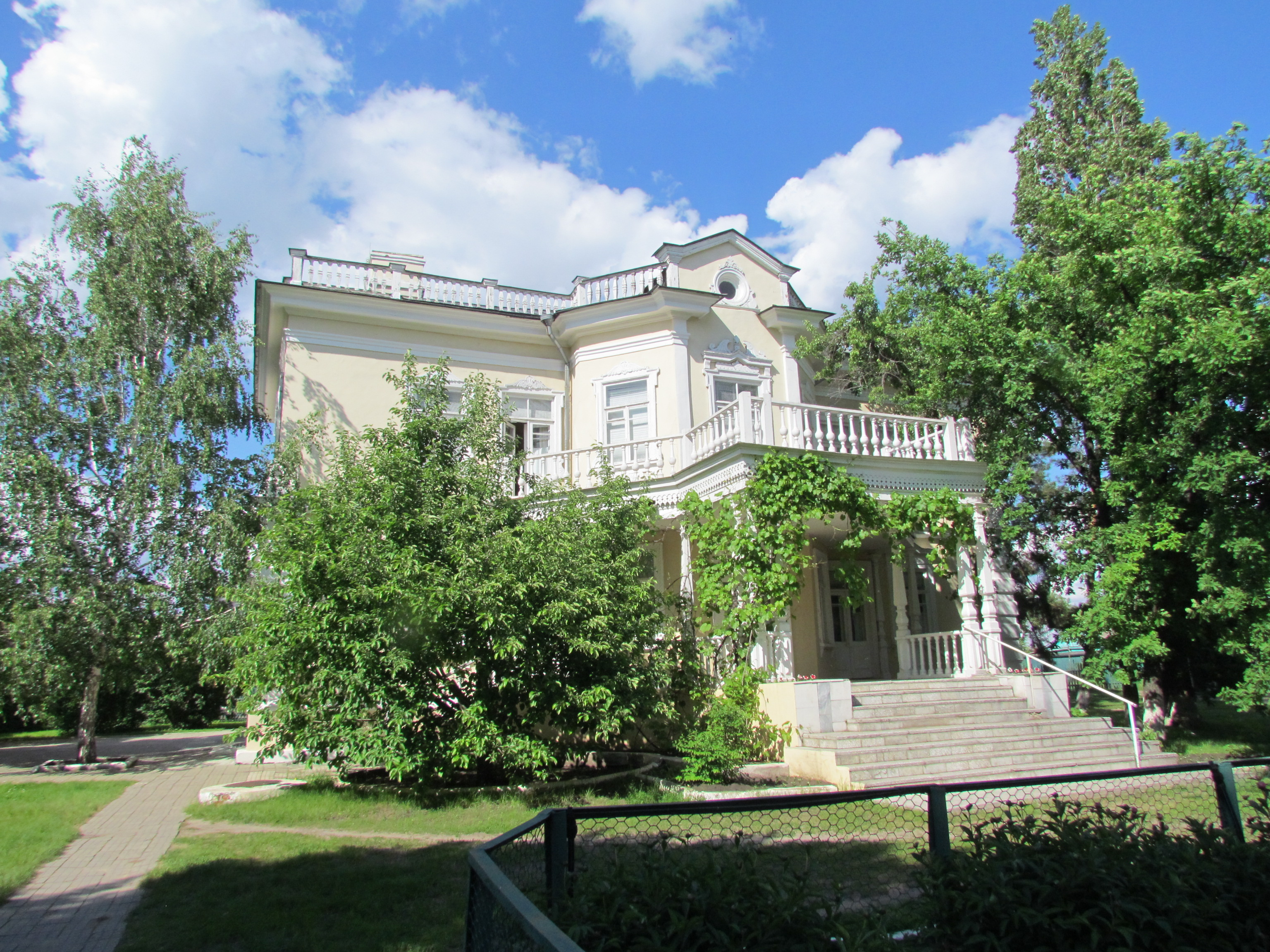
Sholokhov Manor in Vyoshenskaya.

After Sholokhov's death in 1984, a museum honoring the writer was created. The town has erected many monuments to Sholokhov and the characters from his novel And Quiet Flows the Don.

== Notable people ==
Vyoshenskaya is the birthplace of the Soviet/Russian novelist Mikhail Sholokhov and the Cossack historian and Crimean War general Nikolay Krasnov.
