= National Sholokhov Museum-Reserve =

Museum in Rostov, Russia

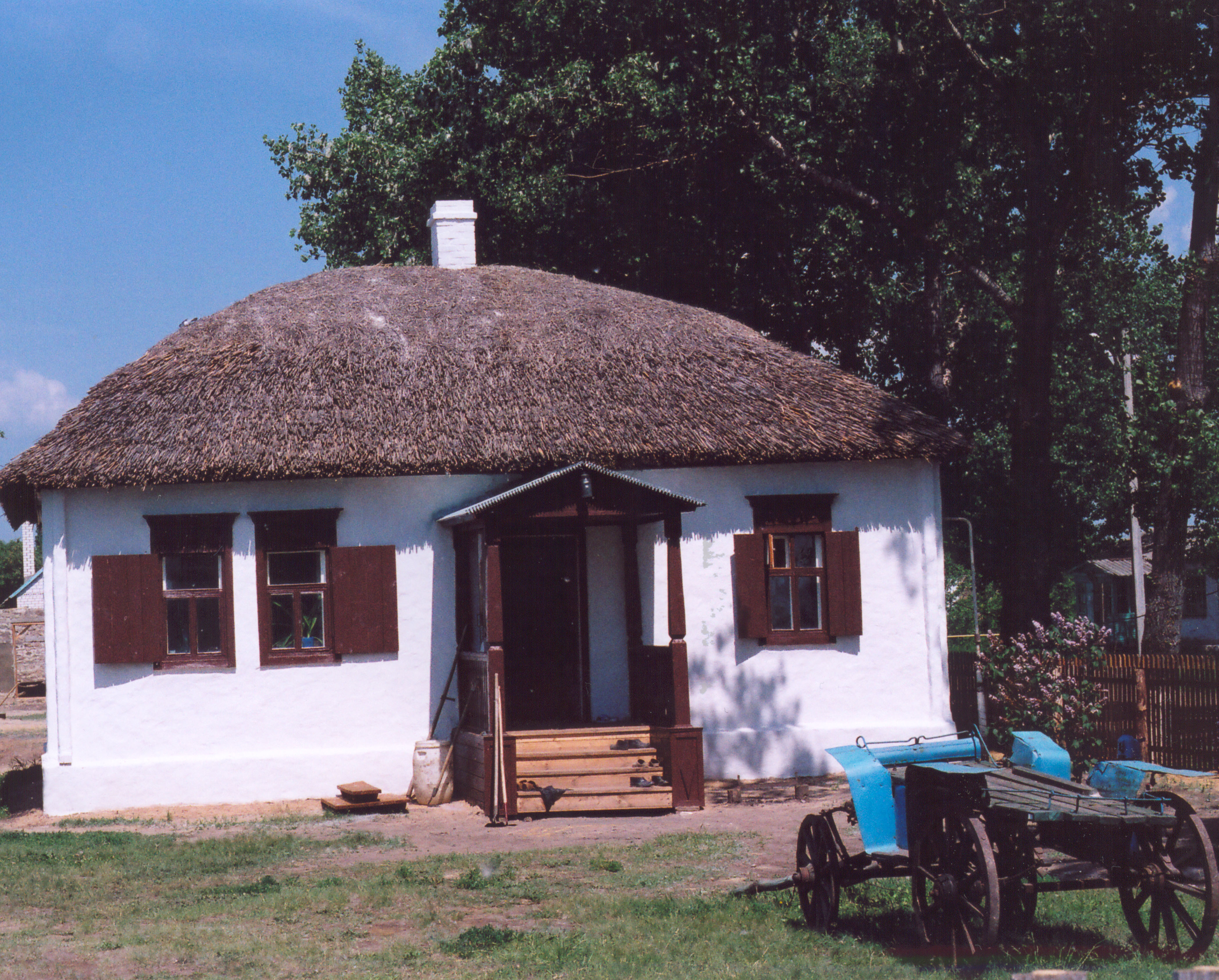
- View of Sholokhov's kuren (Cossack dwelling)

- Location within Russia
- Established: 1984
- Location: 60, Sholokhova street, Vyoshenskaya, Sholokhovsky District, Rostov oblast, Russia
- Coordinates: 49.626440°N 41.728746°E
- Director: Olga Anistrotenko

The National Sholokhov Museum-Reserve (Russian: Музей Шолохова, romanized: Muzyey Sholokhova) is a museum complex in Rostov oblast, Russia which commemorates the life and work of author Mikhail Sholokhov. The main exhibits are located in an apartment where he lived in stanitsa of Vyoshenskaya, and in a house in which he worked on portions of his novel And Quiet Flows the Don. The museum complex was founded in 1984. Its collections comprise over 70,000 items. The collections occupy a complex of five historic buildings in Vyoshenskaya, Karginskaya, Kruzhilinskaya, Rostov-on-Don: khutors, villa of architect N. Sokolov, exhibition center, memorial and historical complex.

== Description ==
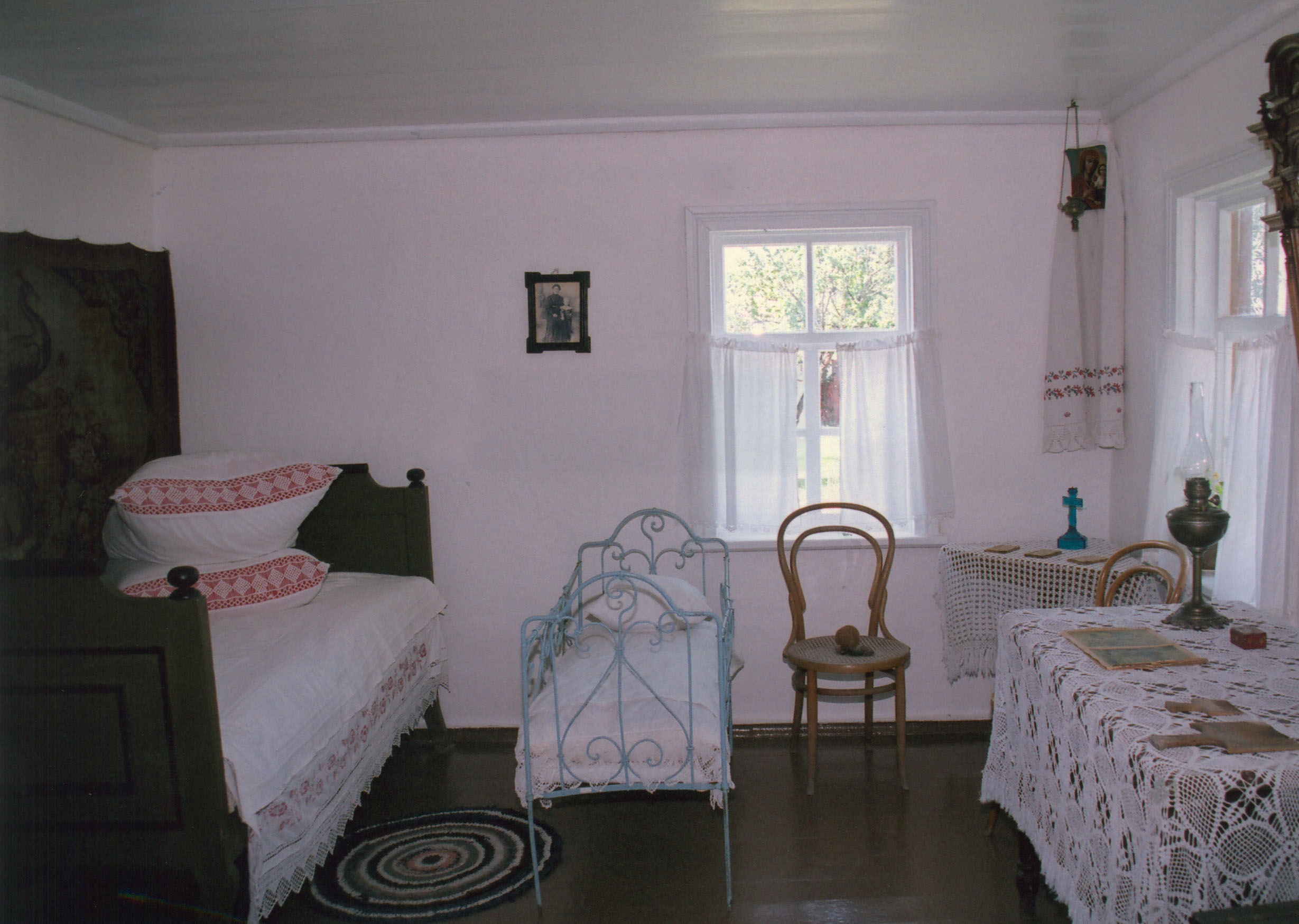
Interior of the Sholokhov's house

Sholokhov's letters, writings, documents, autographs and things are exhibited in the museum. Dwellings with household plots are conserved also. The Sholokhov Museum consists of:

- Manor house in khutor of Kruzhilinsky, where the writer was born. He lived here with parents before 1910. The manor consists of orchard, yard, dolly-shop, banya and stable;
- house in stanitsa of Karginskaya, where Sholokhov produced Azur steppe and most of the Don stories. The building became a museum in 1972. The architecture of the building is common to villages of the Upper Don of the early 20th century;
- house in stanitsa of Vyoshenskaya, where the writer worked on the third volume of And Quiet Flows the Don and Newground under plough;
- house, where Sholokhov's family was living between 1949 and 1984. At this period author produced Fate of a Man, They fought for the homeland and the second volume of Newground under plough.
- "Sholokhov-Centre", in the Martyn Brothers House, Rostov-on-Don. Exhibition space and centre for cultural and educational projects. Hosts lectures, museum classes, creative meetings, and theme nights.
