= Bokovsky District =

Bokovsky District Боковский район
- District
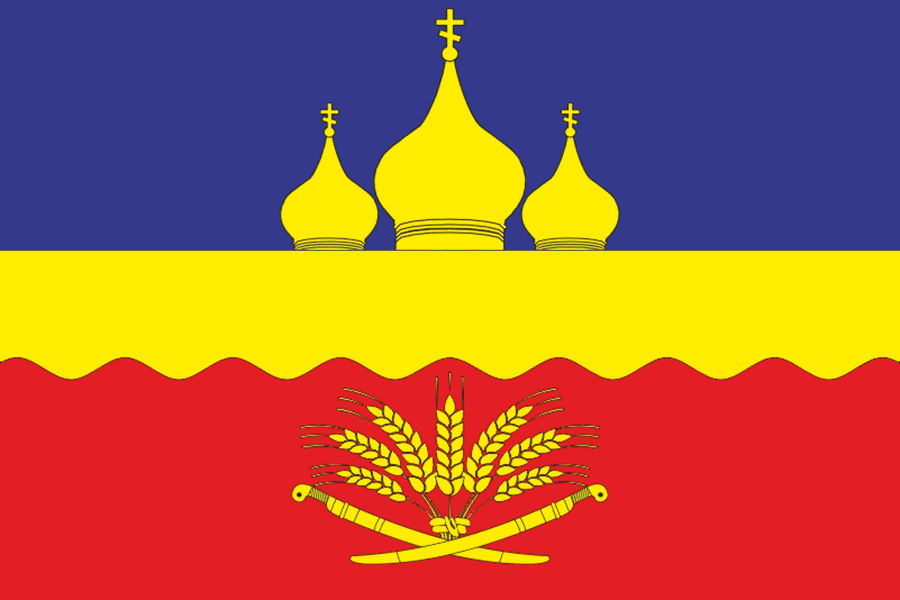
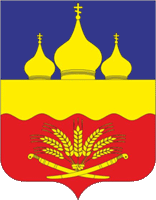
- Flag Coat of arms
- Location of Bokovsky District in Rostov Oblast
- Coordinates: 49°13′20″N 41°50′01″E
- Country: Russia
- Federal subject: Rostov Oblast
- Established: 28 December 1934
- Administrative center: Bokovskaya

Area
  - Total: 1,927 km^{2} (744 sq mi)

Population (2010 Census)
  - Total: 15,085
  - Density: 7.828/km^{2} (20.28/sq mi)
  - Urban: 0%
  - Rural: 100%

Administrative structure
  - Administrative divisions: 7 rural settlement
  - Inhabited localities: 41 rural localities

Municipal structure
  - Municipally incorporated as: Bokovsky Municipal District
  - Municipal divisions: 0 urban settlements, 7 rural settlements
- Time zone: UTC+3 (MSK)
- OKTMO ID: 60607000
- Website: http://bokovskaya.donland.ru/

Bokovsky District (Russian: Бо́ковский райо́н) is an administrative and municipal district (raion), one of the forty-three in Rostov Oblast, Russia. It is located in the north of the oblast. The area of the district is 1,927 square kilometers (744 sq mi). Its administrative center is the rural locality (a stanitsa) of Bokovskaya. Population: 15,085 (2010 Census); 16,111 (2002 Census); 19,212 (1989 Soviet census). The population of Bokovskaya accounts for 32.0% of the district's total population.
