= Sovetsky District, Rostov Oblast =

Sovetsky District Советский район
- District
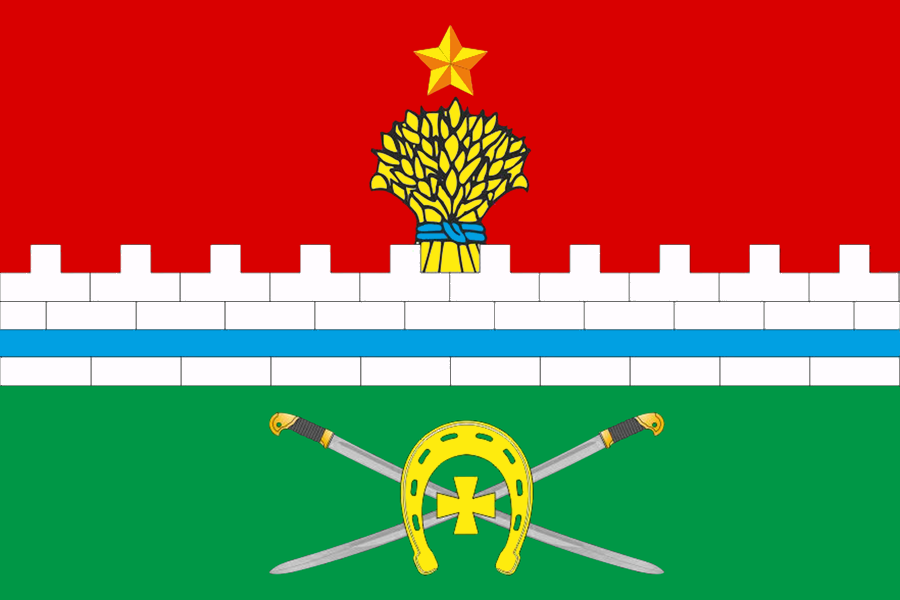
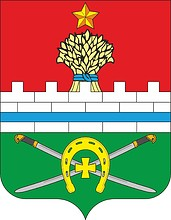
- Flag Coat of arms
- Location of Sovetsky District in Rostov Oblast
- Coordinates: 49°00′29″N 42°07′13″E
- Country: Russia
- Federal subject: Rostov Oblast
- Established: 1990
- Administrative center: Sovetskaya

Area
  - Total: 1,200 km^{2} (460 sq mi)

Population (2010 Census)
  - Total: 6,692
  - Density: 5.6/km^{2} (14/sq mi)
  - Urban: 0%
  - Rural: 100%

Administrative structure
  - Administrative divisions: 3 rural settlement
  - Inhabited localities: 24 rural localities

Municipal structure
  - Municipally incorporated as: Sovetsky Municipal District
  - Municipal divisions: 0 urban settlements, 3 rural settlements
- Time zone: UTC+3 (MSK)
- OKTMO ID: 60652000
- Website: http://sovadmin.donland.ru/

Sovetsky District (Russian: Сове́тский райо́н) is an administrative and municipal district (raion), one of the forty-three in Rostov Oblast, Russia. It is located in the northeast of the oblast. Its administrative center is the rural locality (a stanitsa) of Sovetskaya. Population: 6,692 (2010 Census); 7,449 (2002 Census). The population of Sovetskaya accounts for 34.1% of the district's total population.

== History ==
The district was established in 1990.
