= Tarasovsky District =

Tarasovsky District Тарасовский район (Russian)
- District
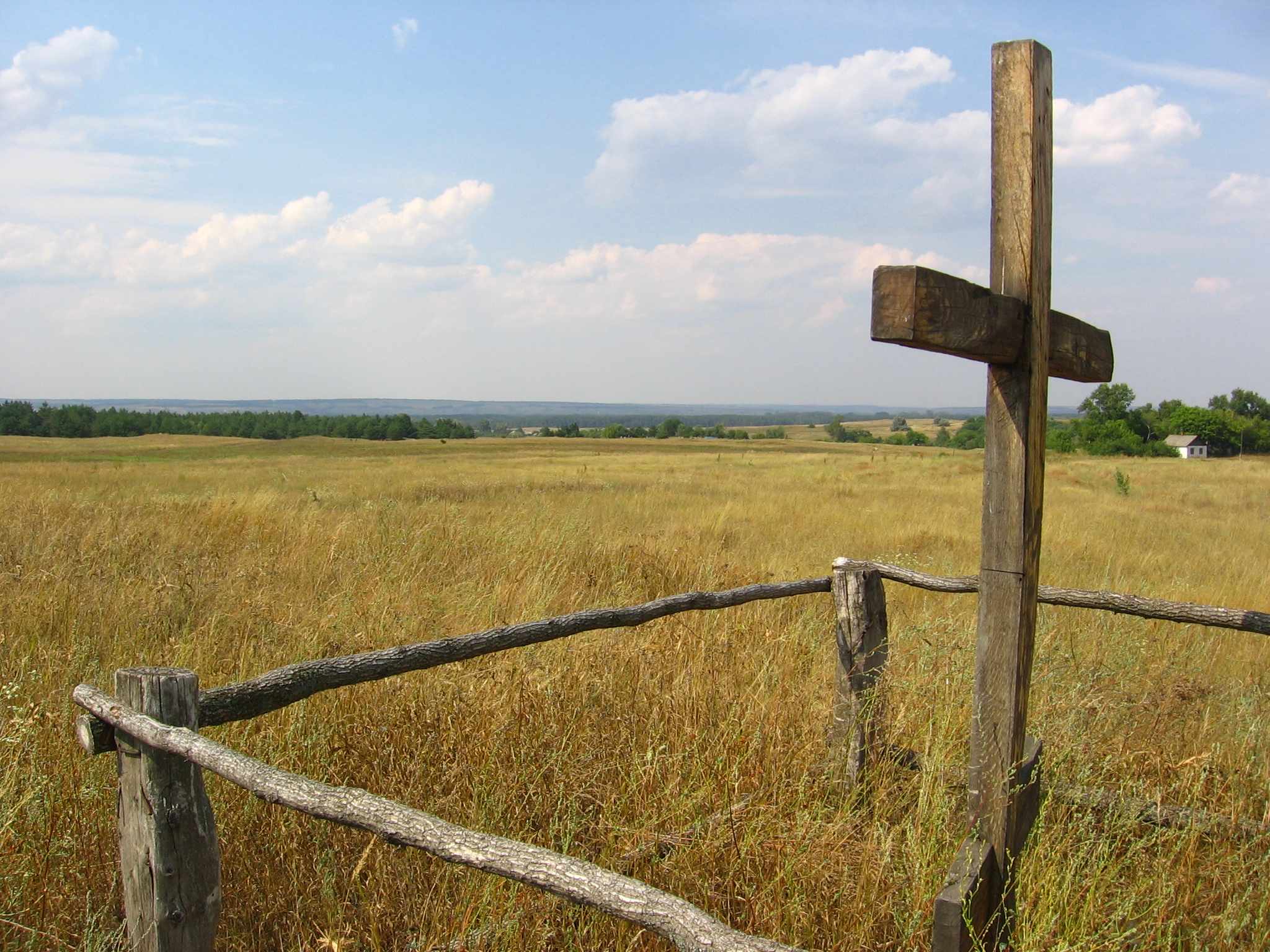
- Site marker of church, Tarasovsky District

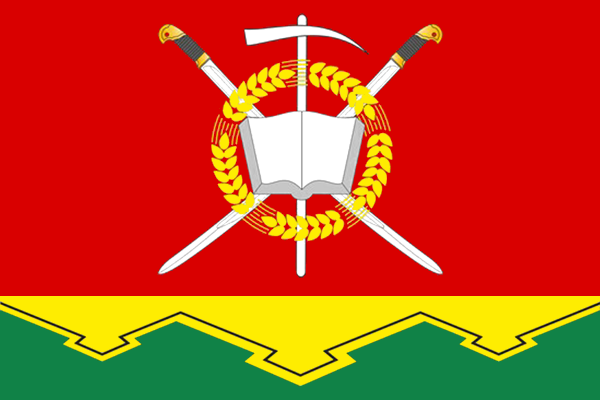
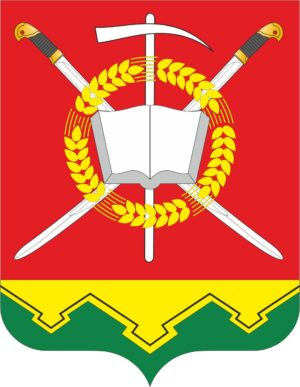
- Flag Coat of arms
- Location of Tarasovsky District in Rostov Oblast
- Coordinates: 48°43′45″N 40°21′49″E
- Country: Russia
- Federal subject: Rostov Oblast
- Established: 1923
- Administrative center: Tarasovsky

Area
  - Total: 2,767.47 km^{2} (1,068.53 sq mi)

Population (2010 Census)
  - Total: 29,802
  - Density: 10.769/km^{2} (27.891/sq mi)
  - Urban: 0%
  - Rural: 100%

Administrative structure
  - Administrative divisions: 10 rural settlement
  - Inhabited localities: 59 rural localities

Municipal structure
  - Municipally incorporated as: Tarasovsky Municipal District
  - Municipal divisions: 0 urban settlements, 10 rural settlements
- Time zone: UTC+3 (MSK)
- OKTMO ID: 60653000
- Website: http://www.taradmin.ru/

Tarasovsky District (Russian: Тара́совский райо́н) is an administrative and municipal district (raion), one of the forty-three in Rostov Oblast, Russia. It is located in the northwest of the oblast. The area of the district is 2,767.47 square kilometers (1,068.53 sq mi). Its administrative center is the rural locality (a settlement) of Tarasovsky. Population: 29,802 (2010 Census); 32,608 (2002 census); 33,639 (1989 Soviet census). The population of the administrative center accounts for 30.3% of the district's total population.
