= Milyutinsky District =

Milyutinsky District Милютинский район
- District
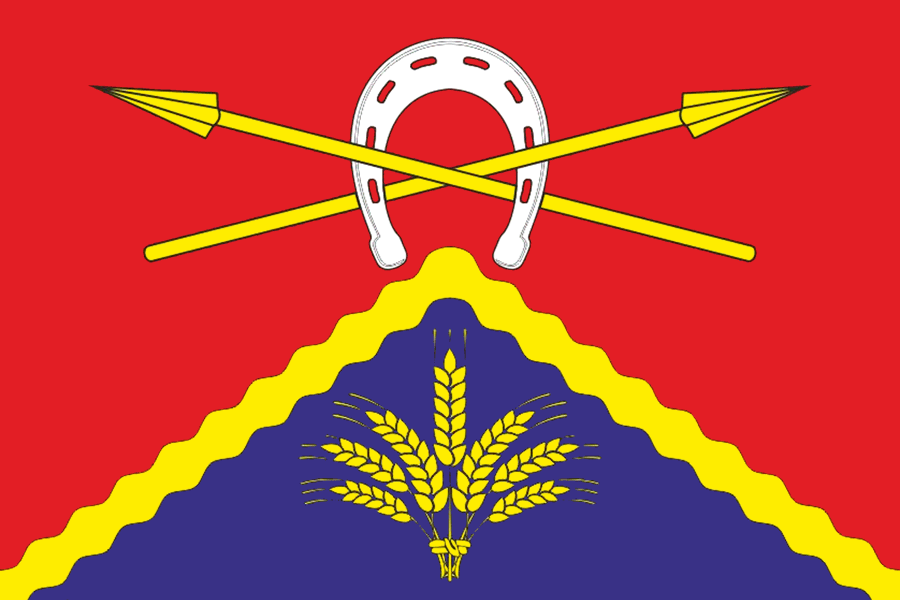
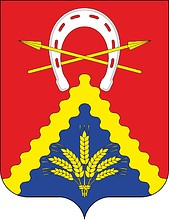
- Flag Coat of arms
- Location of Milyutinsky District in Rostov Oblast
- Coordinates: 48°37′50″N 41°40′15″E
- Country: Russia
- Federal subject: Rostov Oblast
- Established: 1935
- Administrative center: Milyutinskaya

Area
  - Total: 2,116 km^{2} (817 sq mi)

Population (2010 Census)
  - Total: 15,082
  - Density: 7.128/km^{2} (18.46/sq mi)
  - Urban: 0%
  - Rural: 100%

Administrative structure
  - Administrative divisions: 7 rural settlement
  - Inhabited localities: 46 rural localities

Municipal structure
  - Municipally incorporated as: Milyutinsky Municipal District
  - Municipal divisions: 0 urban settlements, 7 rural settlements
- Time zone: UTC+3 (MSK)
- OKTMO ID: 60633000
- Website: http://milutka.donland.ru/

Milyutinsky District (Russian: Милю́тинский райо́н) is an administrative and municipal district (raion), one of the forty-three in Rostov Oblast, Russia. It is located in the northeast of the oblast. The area of the district is 2,116 square kilometers (817 sq mi). Its administrative center is the rural locality (a stanitsa) of Milyutinskaya. Population: 15,082 (2010 Census); 17,847 (2002 Census); 19,352 (1989 Soviet census). The population of Milyutinskaya accounts for 16.7% of the district's total population.
