= Sholokhovsky District =

Sholokhovsky District Шолоховский район (Russian)
- District
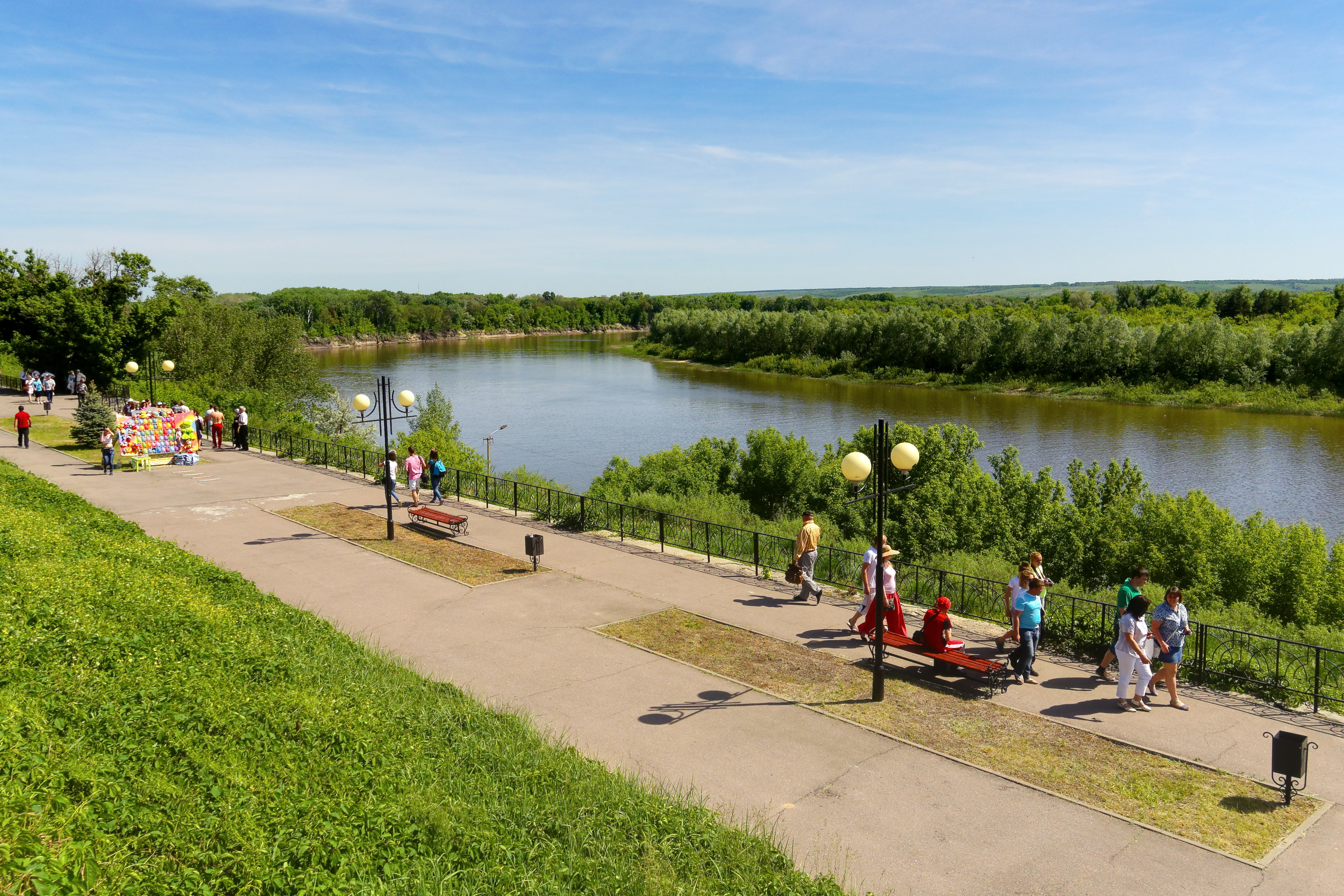
- Vyoshenskaya, Don River embankment, Sholokhovsky District

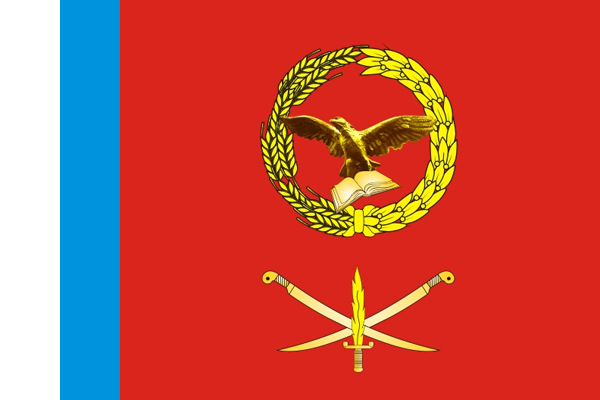
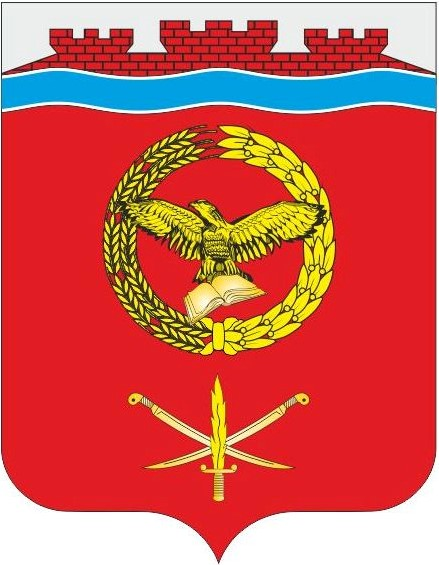
- Flag Coat of arms
- Location of Sholokhovsky District in Rostov Oblast
- Coordinates: 49°37′38″N 41°43′34″E
- Country: Russia
- Federal subject: Rostov Oblast
- Established: 1924
- Administrative center: Vyoshenskaya

Area
  - Total: 2,536 km^{2} (979 sq mi)

Population (2010 Census)
  - Total: 27,294
  - Density: 10.76/km^{2} (27.88/sq mi)
  - Urban: 0%
  - Rural: 100%

Administrative structure
  - Administrative divisions: 9 Rural settlements
  - Inhabited localities: 52 rural localities

Municipal structure
  - Municipally incorporated as: Sholokhovsky Municipal District
  - Municipal divisions: 0 urban settlements, 9 rural settlements
- Time zone: UTC+3 (MSK)
- OKTMO ID: 60659000
- Website: http://veshki.donland.ru/

Sholokhovsky District (Russian: Шо́лоховский райо́н) is an administrative and municipal district (raion), one of the forty-three in Rostov Oblast, Russia. It is located in the north of the oblast. The area of the district is 2,536 square kilometers (979 sq mi). Its administrative center is the rural locality (a stanitsa) of Vyoshenskaya. Population: 27,294 (2010 Census); 29,629 (2002 census); 30,016 (1989 Soviet census). The population of Vyoshenskaya accounts for 33.9% of the district's total population.

== History ==
The district was called Vyoshensky (Вёшенский) until 1984, when it was renamed in honor of author Mikhail Sholokhov, a Nobel Prize-winner, who was from Vyoshenskaya and died earlier that year.
