= Oblivsky District =

Oblivsky District Обливский район (Russian)
- District
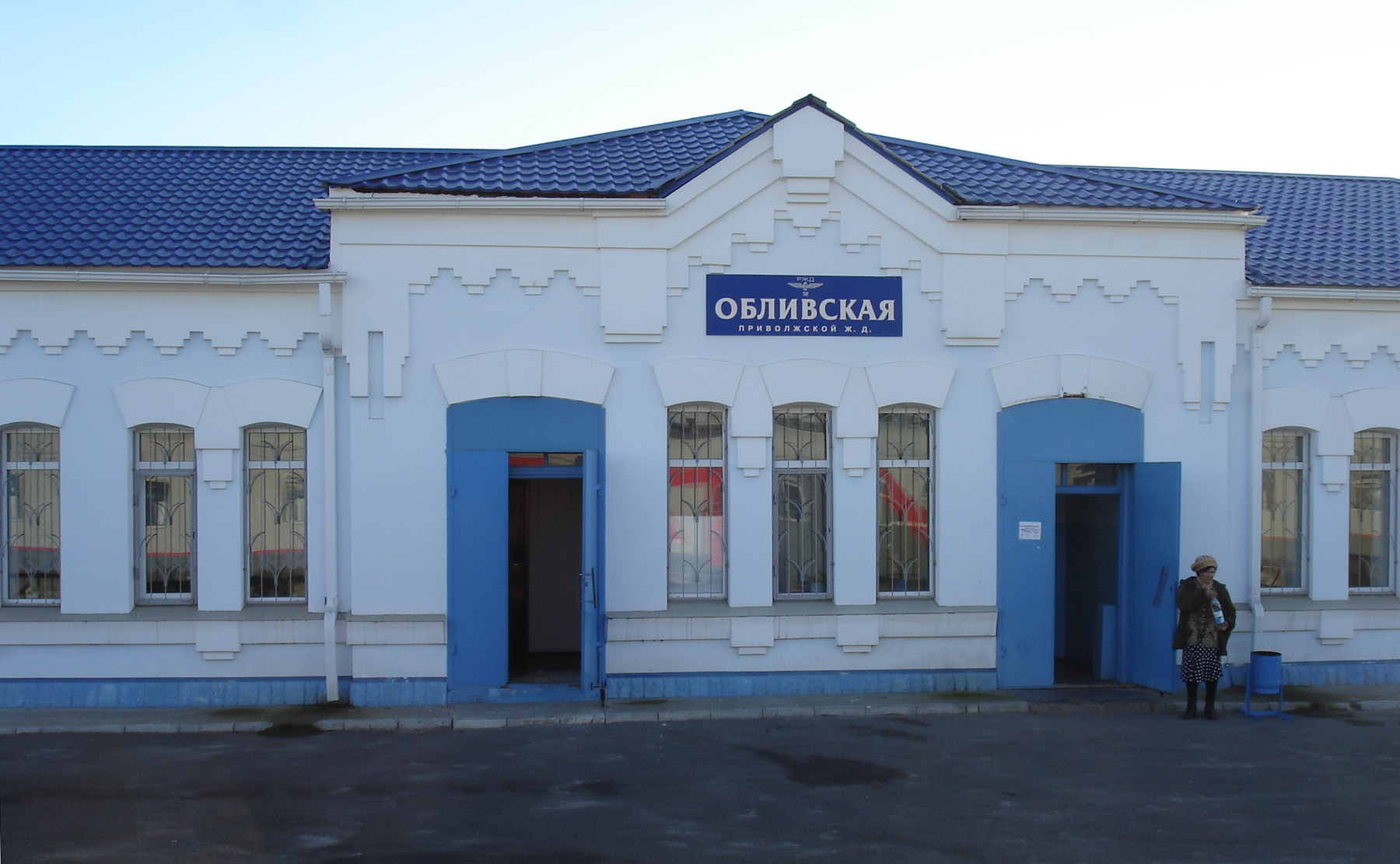
- Oblivskaya Station, Oblivsky District

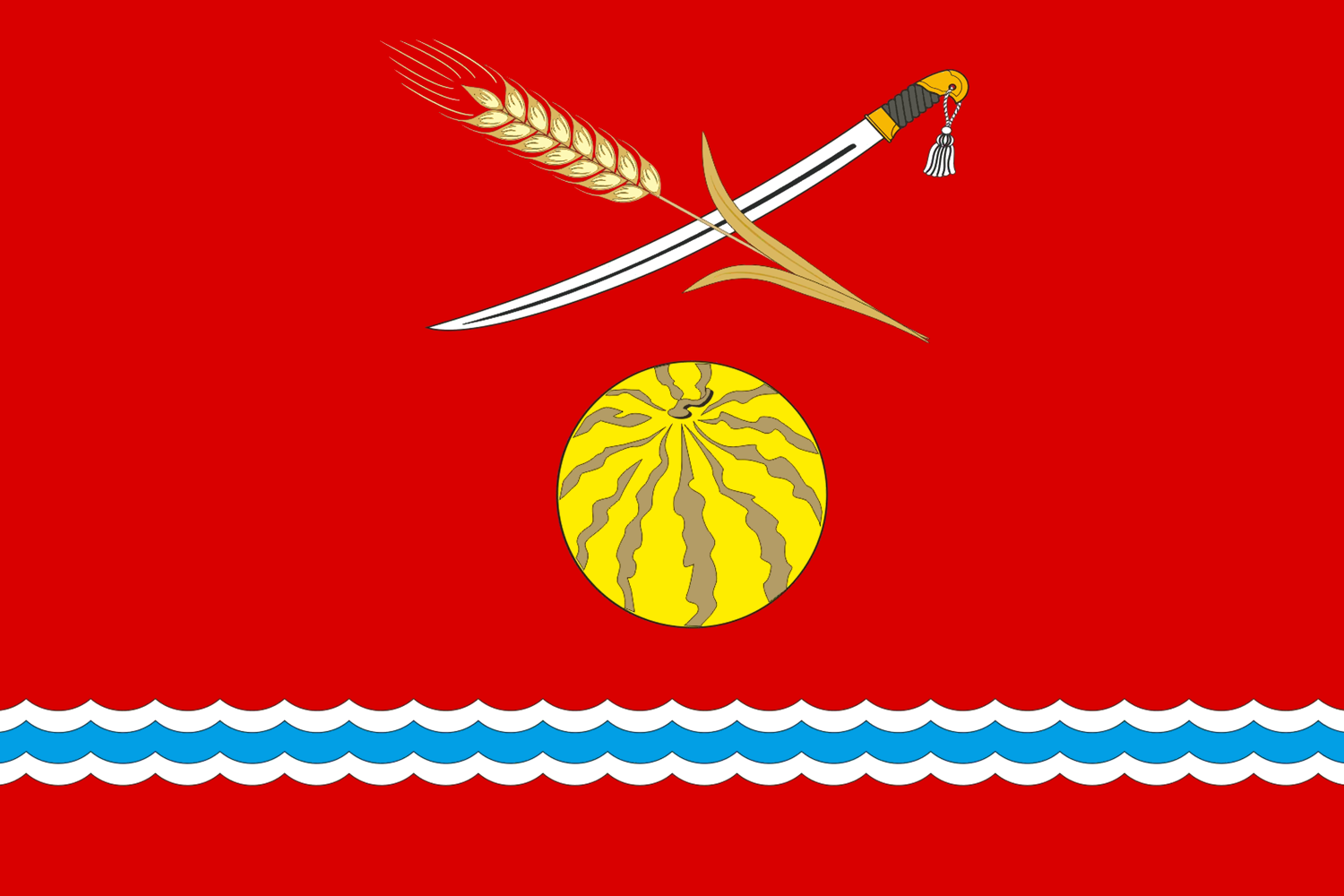
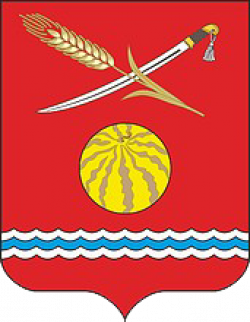
- Flag Coat of arms
- Location of Oblivsky District in Rostov Oblast
- Coordinates: 48°32′12″N 42°29′39″E
- Country: Russia
- Federal subject: Rostov Oblast
- Established: 1924
- Administrative center: Oblivskaya

Area
  - Total: 2,013.5 km^{2} (777.4 sq mi)

Population (2010 Census)
  - Total: 18,872
  - Density: 9.3727/km^{2} (24.275/sq mi)
  - Urban: 0%
  - Rural: 100%

Administrative structure
  - Administrative divisions: 7 rural settlement
  - Inhabited localities: 38 rural localities

Municipal structure
  - Municipally incorporated as: Oblivsky Municipal District
  - Municipal divisions: 0 urban settlements, 7 rural settlements
- Time zone: UTC+3 (MSK)
- OKTMO ID: 60640000
- Website: http://www.oblivsk.ru/

Oblivsky District (Russian: Обли́вский райо́н) is an administrative and municipal district (raion), one of the forty-three in Rostov Oblast, Russia. It is located in the northeast of the oblast. The area of the district is 2,013.5 square kilometers (777.4 sq mi). Its administrative center is the rural locality (a stanitsa) of Oblivskaya. Population: 18,872 (2010 Census); 19,167 (2002 census); 27,610 (1989 Soviet census). The population of Oblivskaya accounts for 52.5% of the district's total population.

== Demographics ==
In the 2002 Census, 30.34% (5,816 out of 19,167) of the total population of Oblivsky District registered themselves as "Cossack" in the ethnicity column, the highest proportion anywhere in Russia.
