= Belaya Kalitva =

Town in Rostov Oblast, Russia

Belaya Kalitva Белая Калитва
- Town
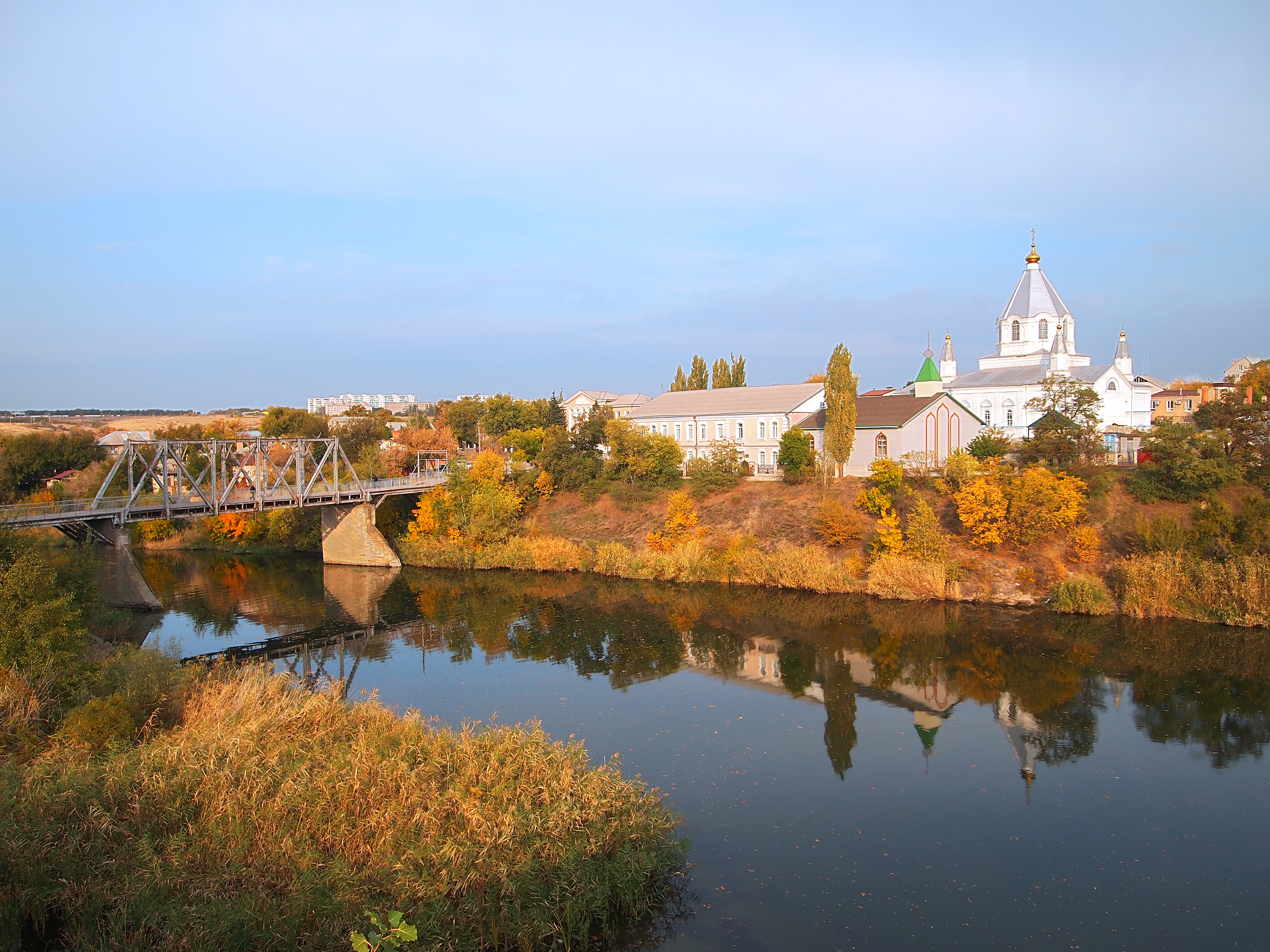

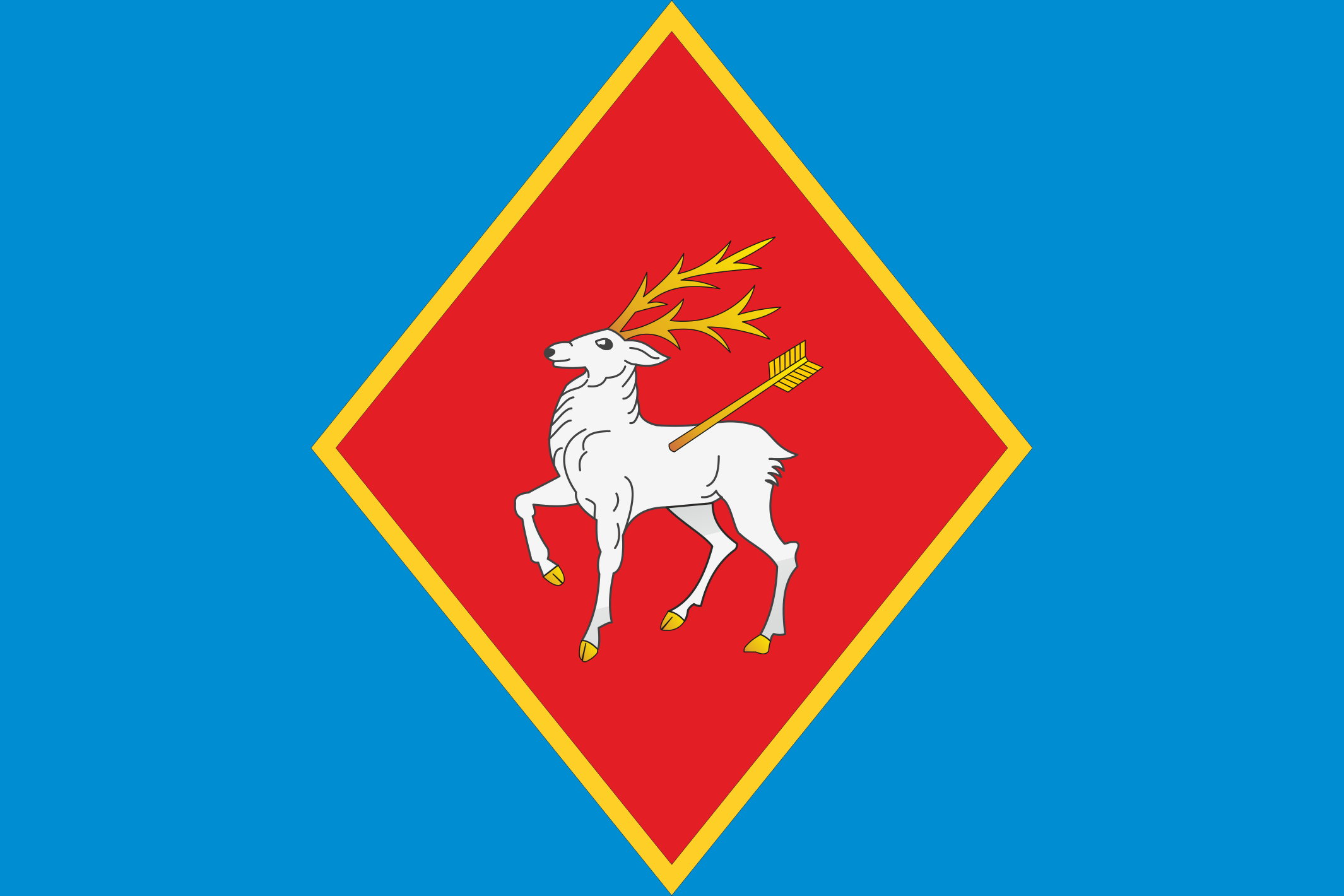
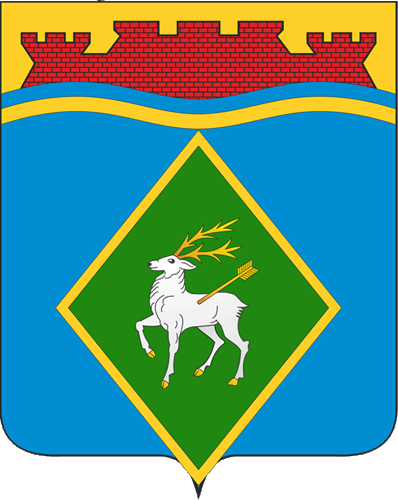
- Flag Coat of arms
- Interactive map of Belaya Kalitva
- Location of Belaya Kalitva Belaya Kalitva (European Russia) Belaya Kalitva (Rostov Oblast)
- Coordinates: 48°11′N 40°46′E
- Country: Russia
- Federal subject: Rostov Oblast
- Administrative district: Belokalitvinsky District
- Urban settlementSelsoviet: Belokalitvinskoye
- Founded: 1703
- Town status since: 1958
- Elevation: 40 m (130 ft)

Population (2010 Census)
  - Total: 43,651
  - Estimate (2025): 38,597 (−11.6%)

Administrative status
  - Capital of: Belokalitvinsky District, Belokalitvinskoye Urban Settlement

Municipal status
  - Municipal district: Belokalitvinsky Municipal District
  - Urban settlement: Belokalitvinskoye Urban Settlement
  - Capital of: Belokalitvinsky Municipal District, Belokalitvinskoye Urban Settlement
- Time zone: UTC+3 (MSK)
- Postal codes: 347040–347042, 347044, 347045, 347049
- Dialing code: +7 86383
- OKTMO ID: 60606101001

Belaya Kalitva (Russian: Бе́лая Калитва́, Ukrainian: Біла Калитва, romanized: Bila Kalytva) is a town and the administrative center of Belokalitvinsky District in Rostov Oblast, Russia. Population: 43,651 (2010 census); 47,347 (2002 census); 47,803 (1989 Soviet census).

== History ==
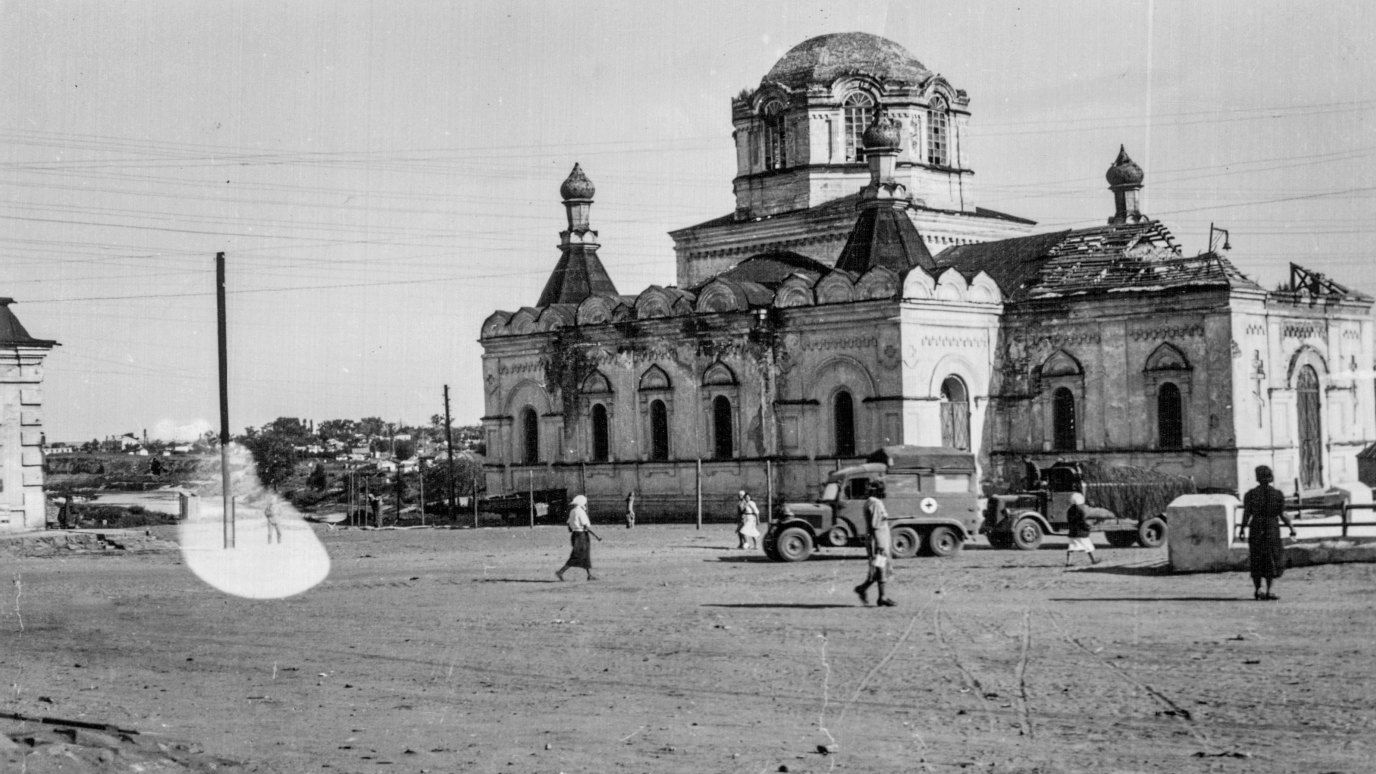
Photo from c. 1942

It was founded in 1703. Bila Kalytva, as it was known in Ukrainian at the time, was administratively part of the Donets Governorate of Ukraine from 1920 to 1924. Afterwards it passed to Russia within the Soviet Union. During World War II, it was occupied by Germany from July 1942 to January 1943.

== Administrative and municipal status ==
Within the framework of administrative divisions, Belaya Kalitva serves as the administrative center of Belokalitvinsky District. As an administrative division, it is, together with three rural localities, incorporated within Belokalitvinsky District as Belokalitvinskoye Urban Settlement. As a municipal division, this administrative unit also has urban settlement status and is a part of Belokalitvinsky Municipal District.
