= Belokalitvinsky District =

Belokalitvinsky District Белокалитвинский район (Russian)
- District
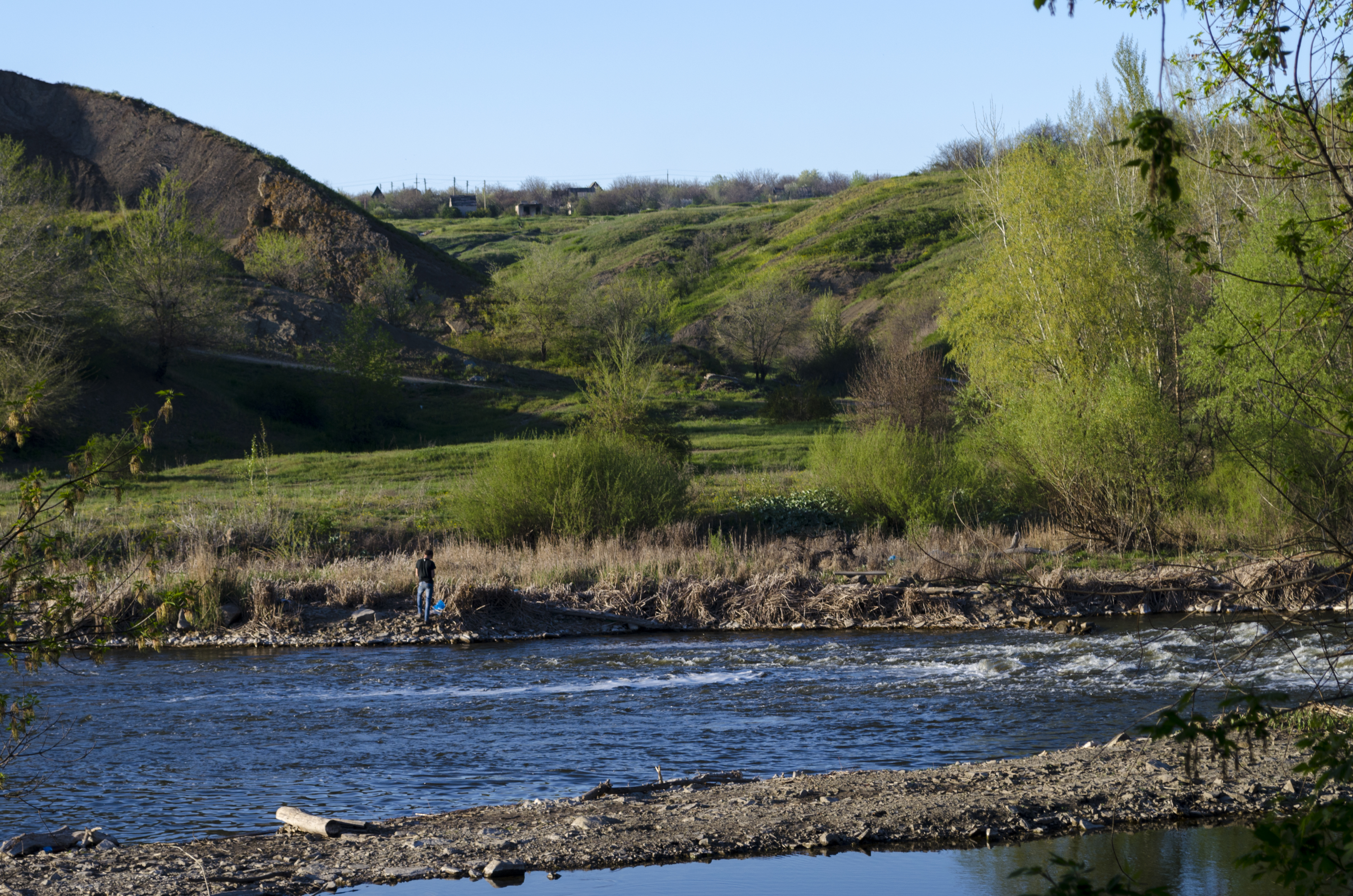
- Kalitva River, Belokalitvinsky District

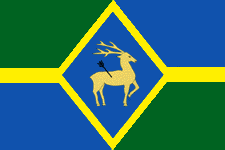
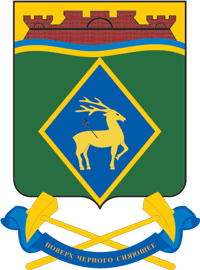
- Flag Coat of arms
- Location of Belokalitvinsky District in Rostov Oblast
- Coordinates: 48°10′N 40°47′E
- Country: Russia
- Federal subject: Rostov Oblast
- Established: 1923
- Administrative center: Belaya Kalitva

Area
  - Total: 2,649.8 km^{2} (1,023.1 sq mi)

Population (2010 Census)
  - Total: 102,039
  - Density: 38.508/km^{2} (99.736/sq mi)
  - Urban: 50.9%
  - Rural: 49.1%

Administrative structure
  - Administrative divisions: 1 Urban settlements (towns), 1 Urban settlements (work settlements), 10 Rural settlements
  - Inhabited localities: 1 cities/towns, 1 urban-type settlements, 74 rural localities

Municipal structure
  - Municipally incorporated as: Belokalitvinsky Municipal District
  - Municipal divisions: 2 urban settlements, 10 rural settlements
- Time zone: UTC+3 (MSK)
- OKTMO ID: 60606000
- Website: http://kalitva-land.ru/

Belokalitvinsky District (Russian: Белокалитвинский райо́н) is an administrative and municipal district (raion), one of the forty-three in Rostov Oblast, Russia. It is located in the center of the oblast. The area of the district is 2,649.8 square kilometers (1,023.1 sq mi). Its administrative center is the town of Belaya Kalitva. Population: 102,039 (2010 Census); 28,294 (2002 census); 28,009 (1989 Soviet census). The population of Belaya Kalitva accounts for 42.8% of the district's total population.

== Notable residents ==
- Tatiana Kotova (born 1985 in Sholokhovsky), entertainer
