= List of equestrian statues in Russia =

This is a list of equestrian statues in Russia.

== Moscow ==
- Monument to General Mikhail Skobelev in the Tverskaya Street, Moscow, by Peter Samonov, erected in 1912, unmount in 1918.
- Equestrian statue of Prince Yury Dolgoruky in the Tverskaya Street, by Sergey Orlov, 1954. A celebrated example of Socialist Realism equestrian sculpture.
- Equestrian statue of Field Marshal Kutuzov in the Kutuzovsky Prospekt, Moscow, by Nikolay Tomsky, 1973.
- Equestrian statue of Marshal Georgy Zhukov at the Manege Square, Moscow, by Vyacheslav Klykov, 1995.
- Equestrian statue of Pyotr Bagration in the Kutuzovsky Prospekt by Merab Merabishvili, 1999.
- Saint George defeats the Dragon on Poklonnaya Gora, Moscow, by Zurab Tsereteli, 1990s.
- Saint George defeats the Dragon on the top of glass cupola at the Manege Square, Moscow, by Zurab Tsereteli, 1995.
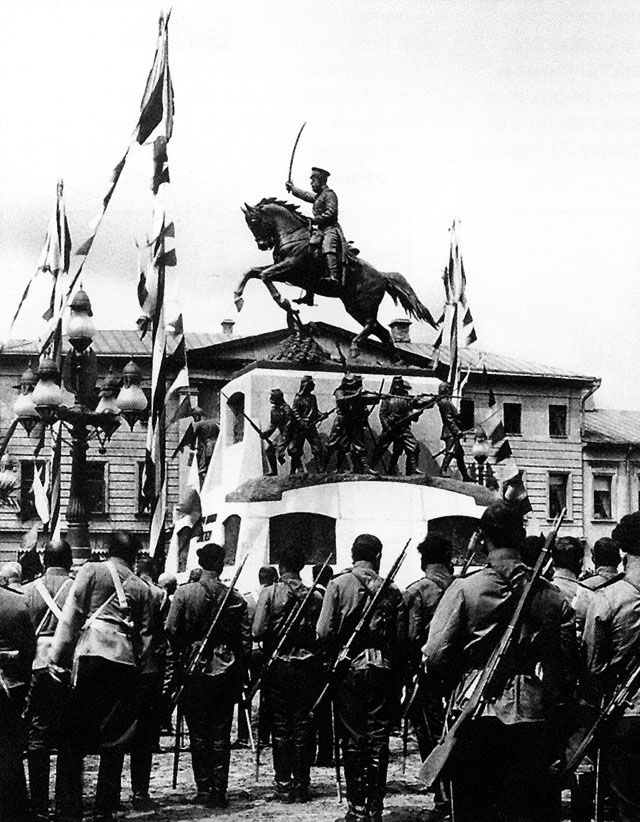
Mikhail Skobelev

== Alagir ==
- Equestrian statue of Saint George in North Ossetia, near the highway from Alagir.

== Baltiysk ==
- Equestrian statue of Empress Elizabeth of Russia by Georgy Frangulian, 2003. Photo

== Belgorod ==
- Equestrian statue of Sviatoslav I in the village of Kholki, close to Belgorod, by Vyacheslav Klykov, 2005.

== Biysk ==
- Equestrian statue of Peter the Great.

== Cheboksary ==
- Monument to Vasily Chapayev by Pavel Balandin, 1960.

== Chernyakhovsk ==
- Monument to Barclay de Tolly.

== Dmitrov ==
- Monument to the Saints Boris and Gleb by Alexander Rukovishnikov, 2006.

== Elista ==
- Equestrian statue of Jangar close to the belt route. Photo

== Oryol ==
- Equestrian statue of Ivan the Terrible at the embankment of the Oka River by Oleg Molchanov, erected on 1 October 2016. The inauguration ceremony was held on October 14, 2016. Photo

== Kaliningrad ==
- Еquestrian monument to Frederick William III by August Kiss, erected in 1851 in Königsberg, unmount in 1950. Photo

== Kolomna ==
- Еquestrian monument Dmitry Donskoy in front of the Kolomna Kremlin wall

== Krasnodar ==
- Еquestrian monument to Kuban Cossacks by Alexander Apollonov, erected in 2005.

== Kushchyovskaya ==
- Еquestrian monument to the 4th Guards Cavalry Cossack Corps, erected in 1967.

== Makhachkala ==
- Еquestrian monument to Magomed-Ali Dakhadayev (Makhach) in front of railway station by Khaz-Bulat Askar-Sarydzha, 1971 Photo
- Еquestrian monument to the Defenders of Motherland in Stepnoy settlement by Sherif Shakhmardanov, 2006 Photo

== Novocherkassk ==
- Monument to Matvei Platov by Anatoly Sknarin, 2003. Photo

== Pskov ==
- Monument to Saint Alexander Nevsky and Russian druzhinniks ("Battle of the Ice") on top of the Sokolikha mountain by Ivan Kozlovsky, 1993.

== Pugachyov ==
- Equestrian of Vasily Chapayev. Photo

== Rostov-on-Don ==
- Monument to Semyon Budyonny by Yevgeny Vuchetich, 1972.
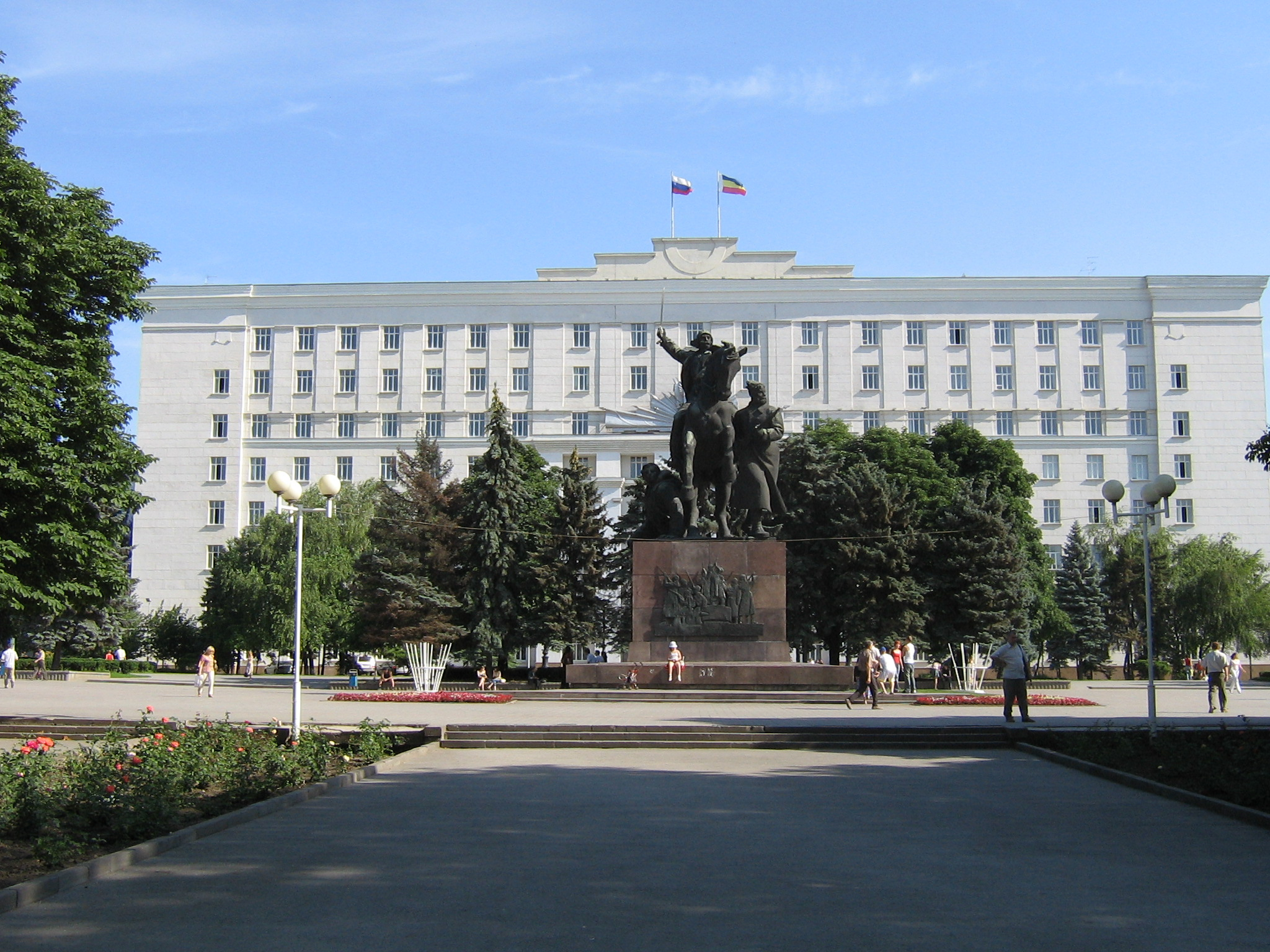
Monument to Semyon Budyonny in Rostov-on-Don

== Ryazan ==
- Monument to Evpaty Kolovrat.
- Monument to Saint George.

== Saint Petersburg ==
- The Bronze Horseman, as this awesome statue of Peter the Great on the Senate Square of Saint Petersburg is generally known, is the main work of Etienne Maurice Falconet, 1782.
- The Monument of Peter the Great in front of St. Michael's Castle. The sculpture by Carlo Bartolomeo Rastrelli, erected in 1800.
- The Monument to Peter the Great in front of Constantine Palace in Strelna. The replica of equestrian monument of Peter the Great, at Brīvības gatves in Riga, 2003. Photo
- Bronze equestrian of Nicholas I in front of St Isaac's Cathedral. It is the first oldest in the world with only the two back legs of the horse have a connection with the pedestal. The monument figures prominently in several works of fiction, including Andrei Bely's modernist novel Petersburg. The sculptor was Peter Clodt von Jürgensburg, and it was erected in 1859.
- Impressionist bronze equestrian of Alexander III of Russia by Paolo Troubetzkoy, formerly at Uprising Square (1909–1937), now in the courtyard of the Marble Palace (since 1994).
- Modern equestrian statues of Saint Alexander Nevsky in front of Alexander Nevsky Lavra, by Valentin Kozenuyk, 2002.
- Equestrian of Vasily Chapayev in front of Semyon Budyonny Military Communications University. The replica of monument in Samara, 1968.
- Equestrian of Grand Duke Nicholas Nikolaevich at Manege Square by Pietro Canonica. Was erected in 1914, destroyed in 1918. Photo
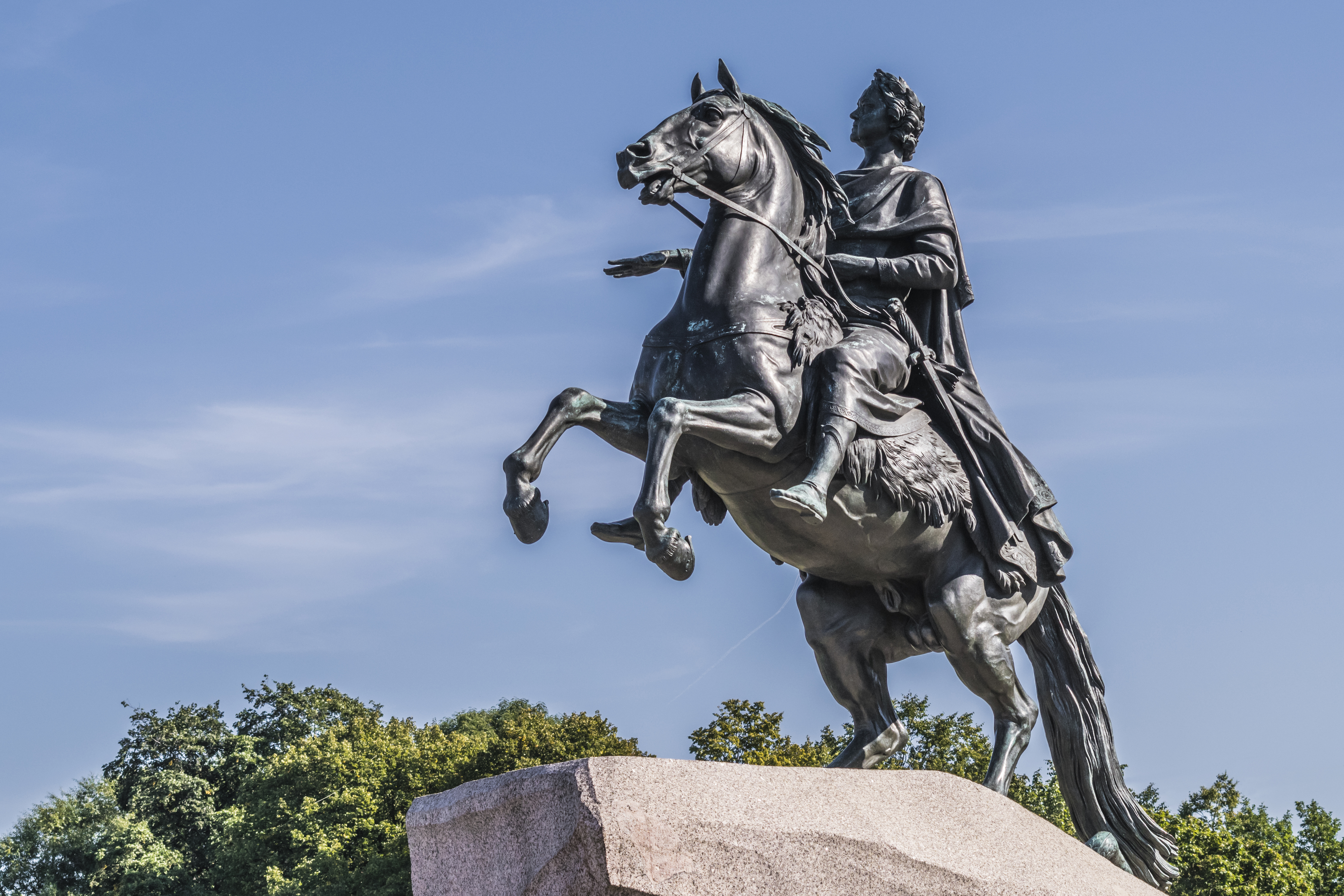
The Bronze Horseman

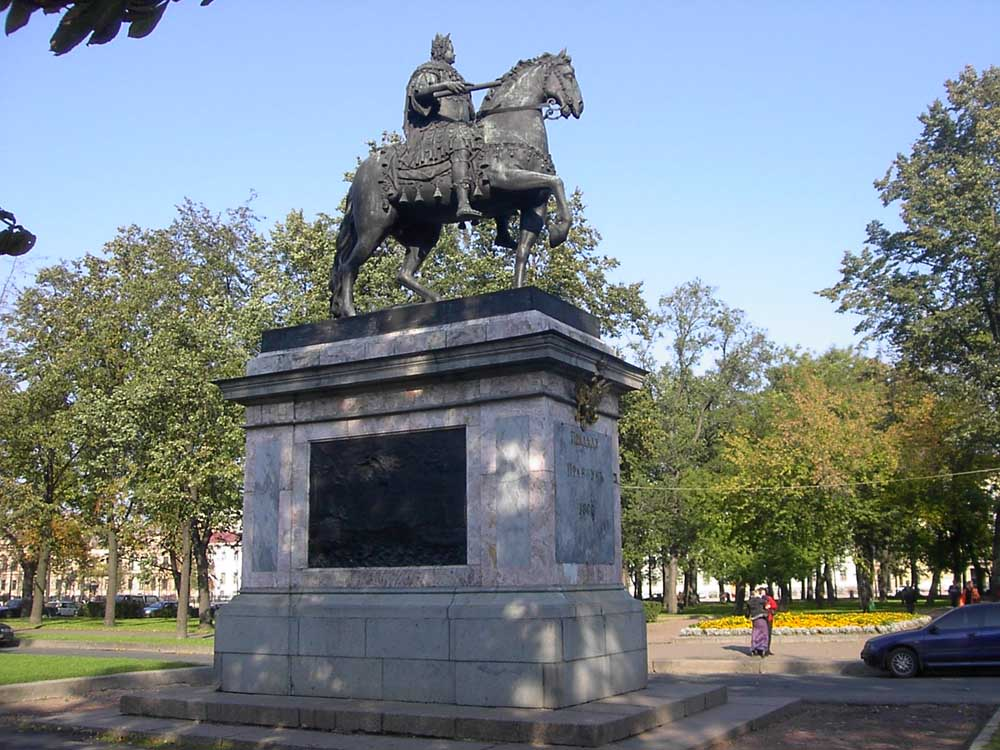
Monument of Peter the Great in front of St. Michael's Castle

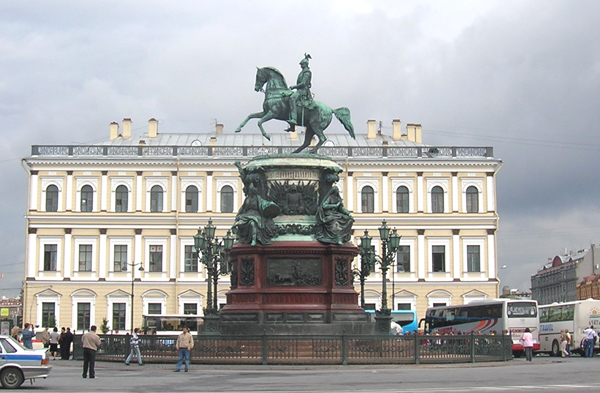
Equestrian of Nicholas I

== Salavat ==
- Monument to Salawat Yulayev, sculptor Andrey Semchenko, 1988. Photo

== Samara ==
- Equestrian of Vasily Chapayev by Matvey Manizer, 1932.

== Tolyatti ==
- Monument to Vasili Tatishchev on the Kuybyshev Reservoir bank by Alexander Rukovishnikov, 1998.

== Tver ==
- Equestrian of Prince Michael of Tver at the Sovietskaya Square by Andrey Kovalchuk, 2008.

== Ulan-Ude ==
- Equestrian statue of Gesar by Alexander Mironov in the Victory avenue, 2006.

== Ufa ==
- Monument to Salawat Yulayev on the Belaya River bank, sculptor Soslanbek Tavasiyev, 1967. Photo

== Veshenskaya ==
- Equestrian statue of Grigory Melekhov (hero of the And Quiet Flows the Don epic), close to Kruzhilinsky khutor.
- Equestrian statue of Grigory Melekhov and Aksinia Astakhova (heroes of the And Quiet Flows the Don epic), at the bank of Don.

== Vladimir ==
- Monument to Grand Prince Vladimir and Saint Theodore I of Rostov by Sergey Isakov, 28.07.2007.

== Yekaterinburg ==
- Equestrian statue of Marshal Georgy Zhukov by Konstantin Grunberg, 1995. Photo

== Yelabuga ==
- Equestrian statue of Nadezhda Durova by Fyodor Lyakh, 1993.
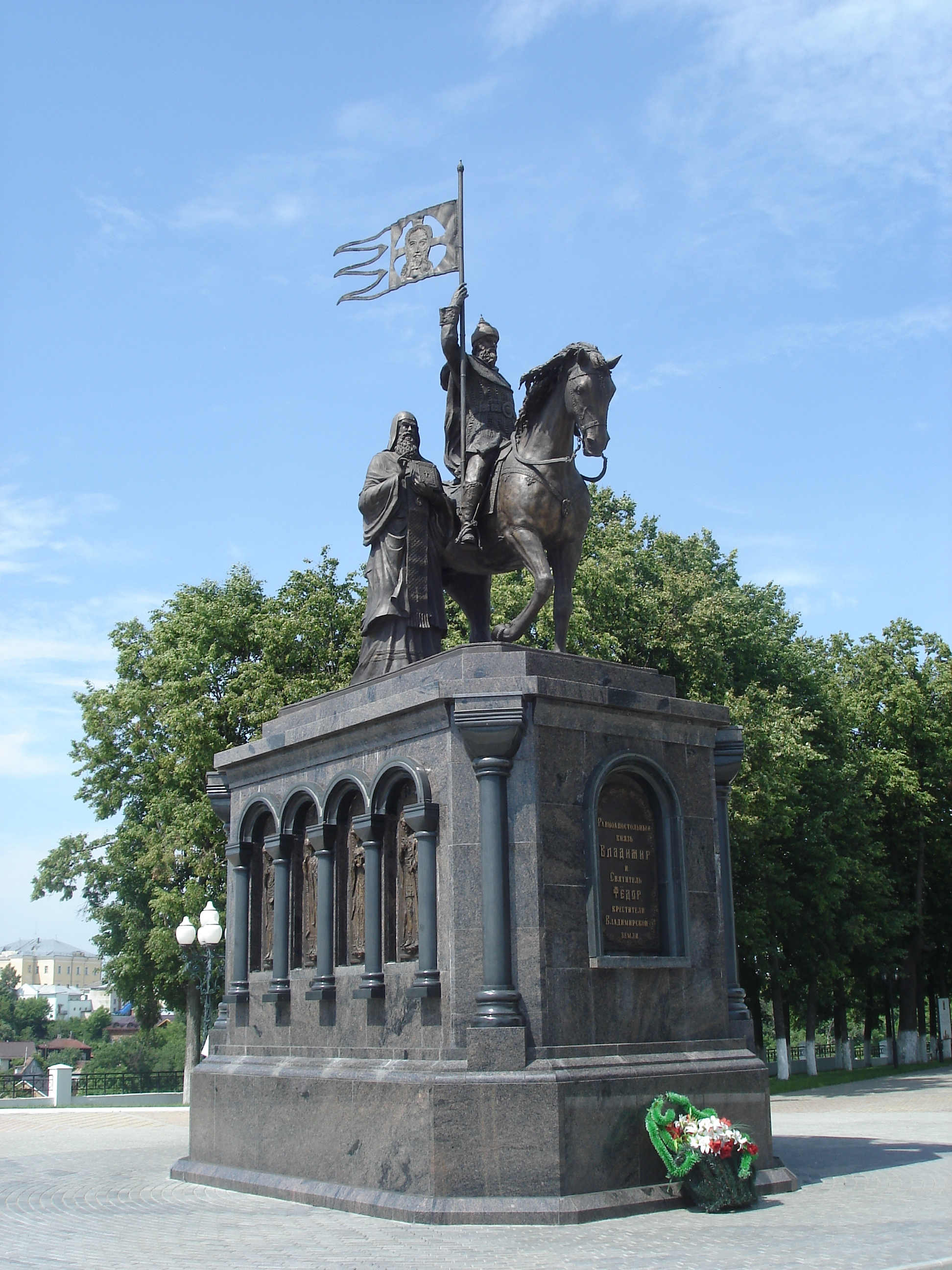
Monument to Grand Prince Vladimir and Saint Theodore I of Rostov in Vladimir
