= Fate of a Man =

Fate of a Man may refer to:

- Fate of a Man (short story), a 1956 short story by Mikhail Sholokhov
- Fate of a Man (film), a 1959 Soviet World War II film, adapted from the short story
