= Grigory and Aksinya in a boat (sculpture composition) =

- Artist: Sergei Oleshnya
- Year: 1983
- Location: Rostov-on-Don

Grigory and Aksinya in a boat (Russian: Григорий и Аксинья в лодке) is a sculpture composition of principal characters of the epic novel And Quiet Flows the Don in Rostov-on-Don, Rostov oblast, Russia. It was designed by sculptor Sergei Oleshnya. The monument was opened on Beregovaya Street near the river port of Rostov-on-Don in June 2003. This composition was the third monument in Rostov oblast devoted to personages of the novel And Quiet Flows the Don. Grigory and Aksinya in a boat along with other monuments of the Don theme made appearance in Rostov-on-Don within the provision of urban amenities.

== Description ==
The sculpture composition illustrate one of the elements of the epic novel And Quiet Flows the Don. Grigory and his dear sit in a rowing boat during a boat trip on the Don River. Aksinya is dressed in a full feather. It is decorated with ruching and lace. In hands she holds a small bunch of flowers. Grigory sits on a stern. He is dressed in military uniform. Bronze figures of Sholohov's personages are depicted a full size. Between the sculptures there is a bench, which is used by tourists for photographing. Upborne bow of the boat is installed on pile of stones. Asymmetric concrete surfacing is faced by an asymmetric tiles. Some of the locals criticized the composition for this scene from the book has nothing to do with Rostov-on-Don.

== See also ==
- Grigory and Aksinya (sculpture composition in Vyoshenskaya)
- Monument to the Don Cossacks
