= Grigory and Aksinya (sculpture composition) =

Sculpture composition in Veshenskaya, Russia

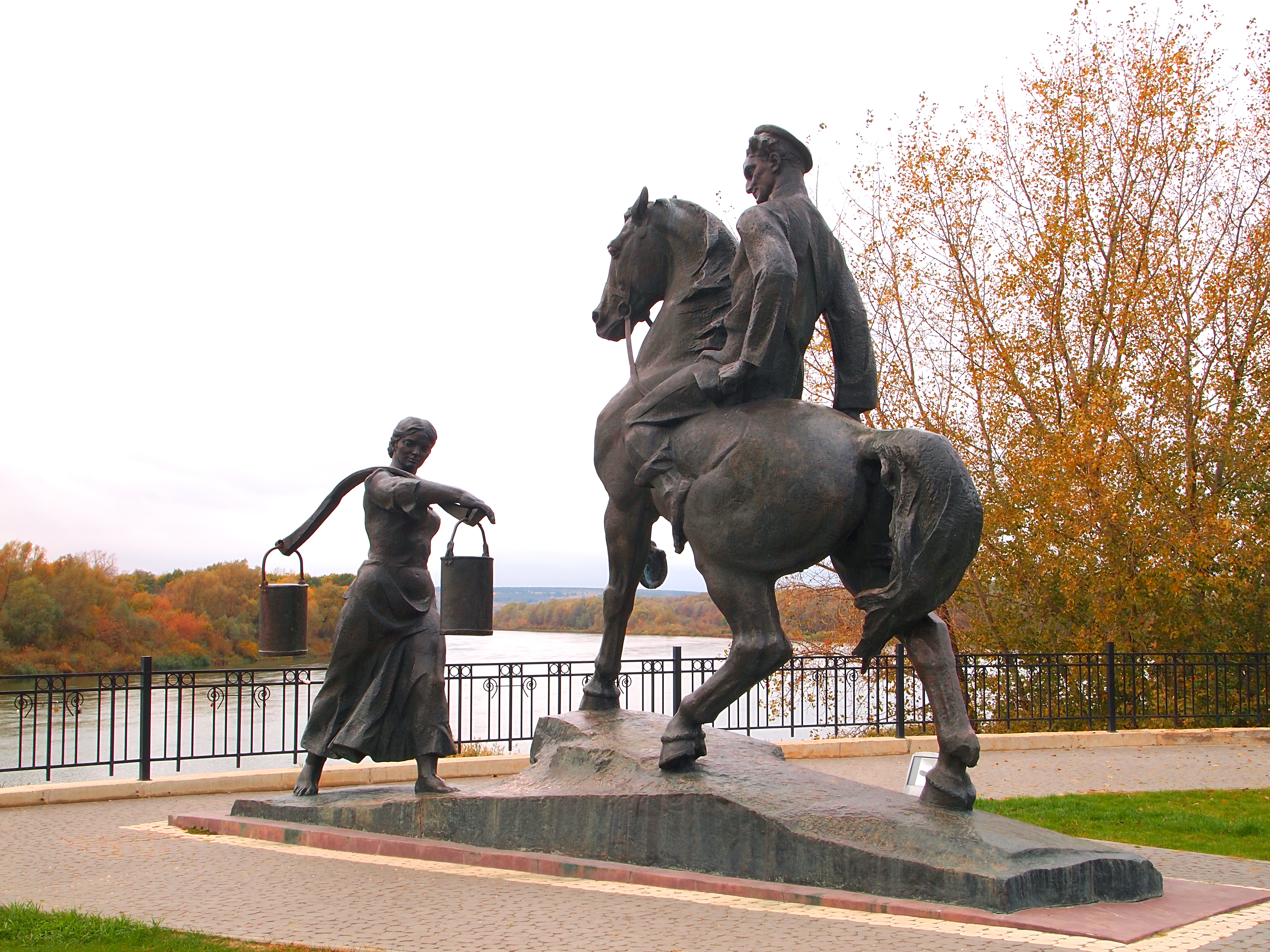
- Artist: N. Mozhaev
- Year: 1983
- Type: Equestrian statue
- Location: Veshenskaya

Grigory and Aksinya (Russian: Григорий и Аксинья) is a sculpture composition of principal characters of the epic novel And Quiet Flows the Don in Vyoshenskaya, Rostov Oblast, Russia. It was designed by sculptor N. Mozhaev.

== Description ==
The sculpture composition illustrates one of the elements of the epic novel And Quiet Flows the Don by Mikhail Sholokhov. Located on the left bank of the river Don, the monument is 6.5 m in height. The character Aksinya is depicted barefoot, dressed in a wide skirt and neck-flap, and approaching the khutor with a carrying pole. Her neighbour Grigory jokingly blocks her path. A passage from the novel is cast in bronze:

Aksinya gave him a conciliatory smile and left the path, trying to pass the horse. Grigory turned the animal sideways and blocked the way.

"Let me pass, Grisha."

"I won't."

"Don't be fool. I must see to my husband."

Grigiry smilingly teased the horse, and it edged Aksinya towards the bank.

"Let me pass you devil!" There are some people over there. If they see us what will they think?" she muttered.

She swept a frightened glance around and passed by, frowning and without a backward glance.

== History ==
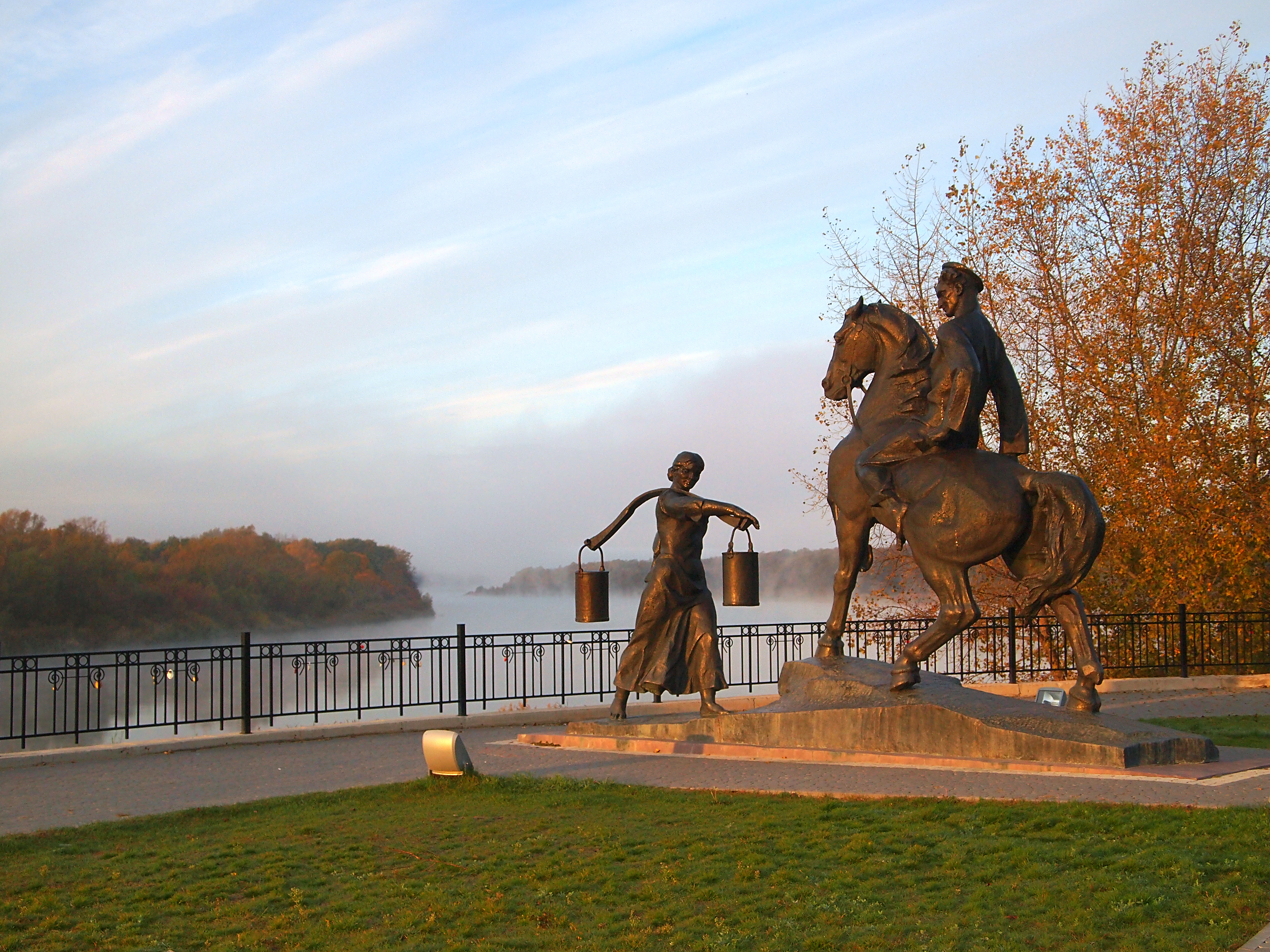

N. Mozhaev created a project of the monument in 1957. E. Mozhaeva, V. Desyatnichuk, V. Voloshin. G Holodnyi also worked on the composition. Mikhail Sholokhov was shown a maquette, and advised on some changes, including changing the buckets from a conical to cylindrical shape and changing the horse from an Arabian type to a Don. 26 years later, the project was accomplished as a 12-ton composition. The monument was opened opposite the river port of Rostov-on-Don in 1983. In 1995 it was transferred in Vyoshenskaya, where the novel takes place.

== See also ==
- Grigory and Aksinya in a boat (sculpture composition)
- Monument to the Don Cossacks
