= Brian Murphy (scholar) =

Arthur Burgess Murphy (2 May 1923 – 15 May 2017), often known as Brian Murphy, was an Irish scholar of Russian literature and Professor Emeritus of the University of Ulster.

Murphy was born on 2 May 1923 in Rathdown, Ireland. He was regarded as an expert on the life and works of Mikhail Sholokhov and edited Robert Daglish's English translation of Sholokhov's best-known work And Quiet Flows the Don. In 1977, he travelled to meet Sholokhov at the latter's hometown of Veshenskaya. He also published a book on Mikhail Zoshchenko. Murphy died in Oxfordshire, England on 15 May 2017, at the age of 94.

== Selected works ==
- Aspectival Usage in Russian
- Mikhail Zoshchenko - A Literary Profile
- Introduction and Commentary to Mikhail Sholokhov's "Tikhiy Don"
