= Carlo Bartolomeo Rastrelli =

Italian sculptor (1666–1744)

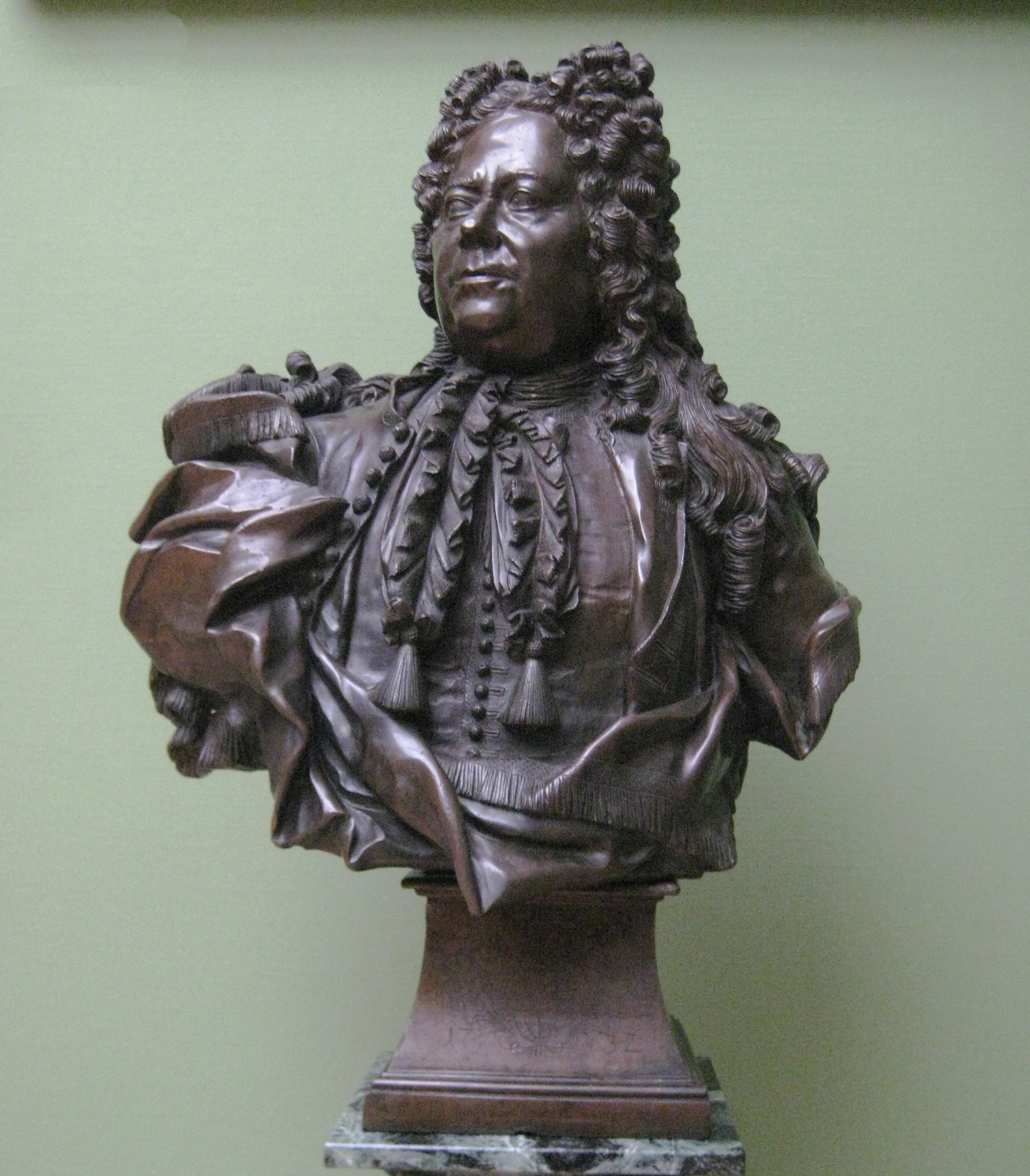
- Possible self-portrait (1732)
- Born: Carlo Bartolomeo Rastrelli; January 11, 1666; Florence, Grand Duchy of Tuscany
- Died: November 18, 1744; Saint Petersburg, Russian Empire
- Known for: Sculpture, architecture

Carlo Bartolomeo Rastrelli (11 January 1666 – 18 November 1744) was an Italian sculptor and architect. Born in Italy, he moved in 1716 to Russia, where he worked until his death. His most famous works include the Monument to Peter I (St. Michael's Castle) and a wax figure and several busts of Peter the Great. His son Francesco Bartolomeo Rastrelli became a prominent architect in Russia.

== Biography ==
Carlo Bartolomeo Rastrelli was born in Florence, Tuscany, in the family of a wealthy nobleman Francesco Rastrelli. Carlo received versatile training in arts, which included work with bronze and jewelry, as well as drawing, casting and architecture design. However, he could not apply his skills in Florence, which was going through an economic crisis. Rastrelli moved with his wife, a Spanish noblewoman, to Rome and then to Paris, where she gave birth to their son Francesco Bartolomeo. In 1706, Rastrelli completed the tomb of a minister of Louis XIV of France, for which he received the title of Count. The tomb was demolished in 1792.

He continued designing tombstones in the Baroque style, but they found less success in France, which already moved toward Neoclassicism. Peter the Great used this situation to attract demoted artists to Russia, and so in 1715 Rastrelli and his son were invited to Russia.

Rastrelli's duties included the design of palaces, gardens, fountains, theatrical decorations, stamps for minting coins and medals, as well as monuments, using various materials such as rocks, metals and wax. Rastrelli also had to teach arts to Russian students. He arrived in Saint Petersburg in March 1716 on a three-year contract, but stayed in Russia until his death in 1744.

== Works ==
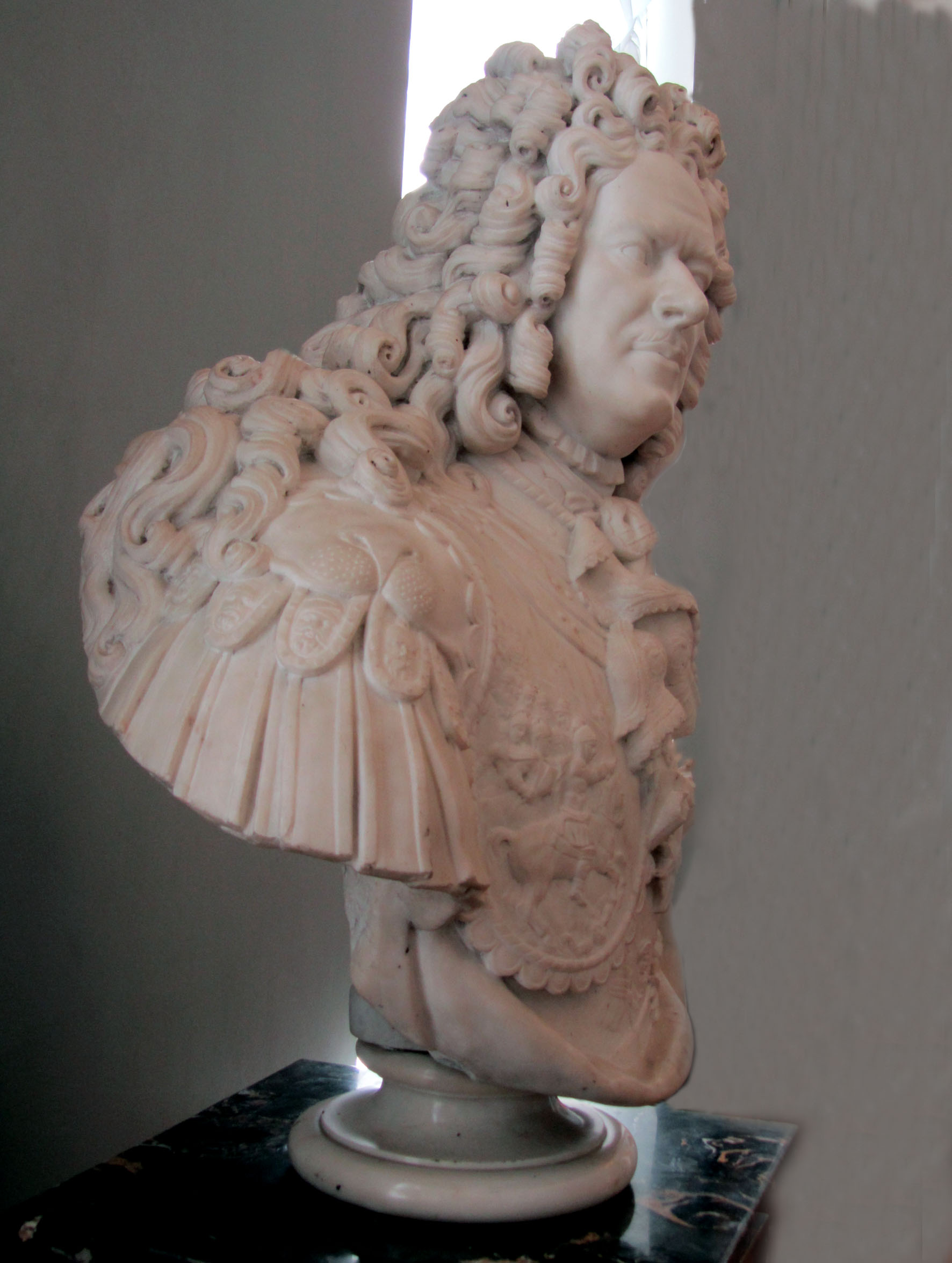
Bust of Alexander Menshikov, the marble copy.

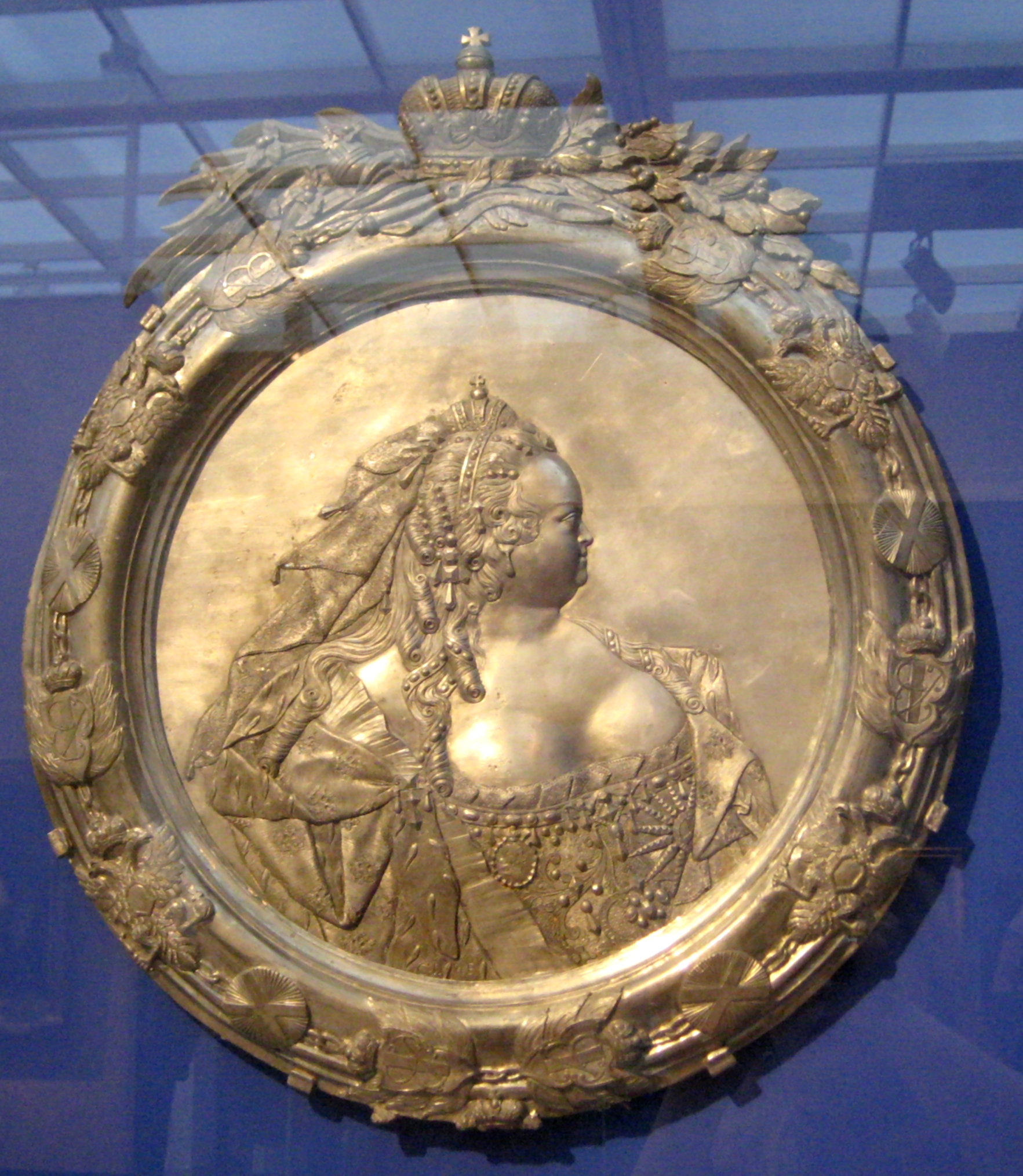
Elizabeth of Russia, gilded tin.

In Russia Rastrelli initially worked primarily as an architect. He participated in the planning of Vasilyevsky Island and in the construction of the palace in Strelna. He also proposed his design of the building of the Senate, made models of hydraulic machines and fountains, and taught at the Academy of Sciences. However, he soon started experiencing a strong competition from Jean-Baptiste Alexandre Le Blond, an architect who also moved to Russia in 1716, and focused on sculpture. His first significant work was bust of Alexander Menshikov, which he completed by the end of 1716 using lead (currently in a private collection in Paris), and in 1717 cast in bronze. A marble copy of the bust was created in the 1740s by Vitali.

In the 1720s he worked on the Grand Cascade and Samson Fountain in Peterhof Palace and on a triumphal pillar commemorating the Great Northern War. A model of the latter unfinished work was installed in the Hermitage in 1938. In 1741, he completed the statue of "Anna Ioannovna with a black boy", which is exhibited in the Russian Museum.

=== Busts and wax figure of Peter I ===
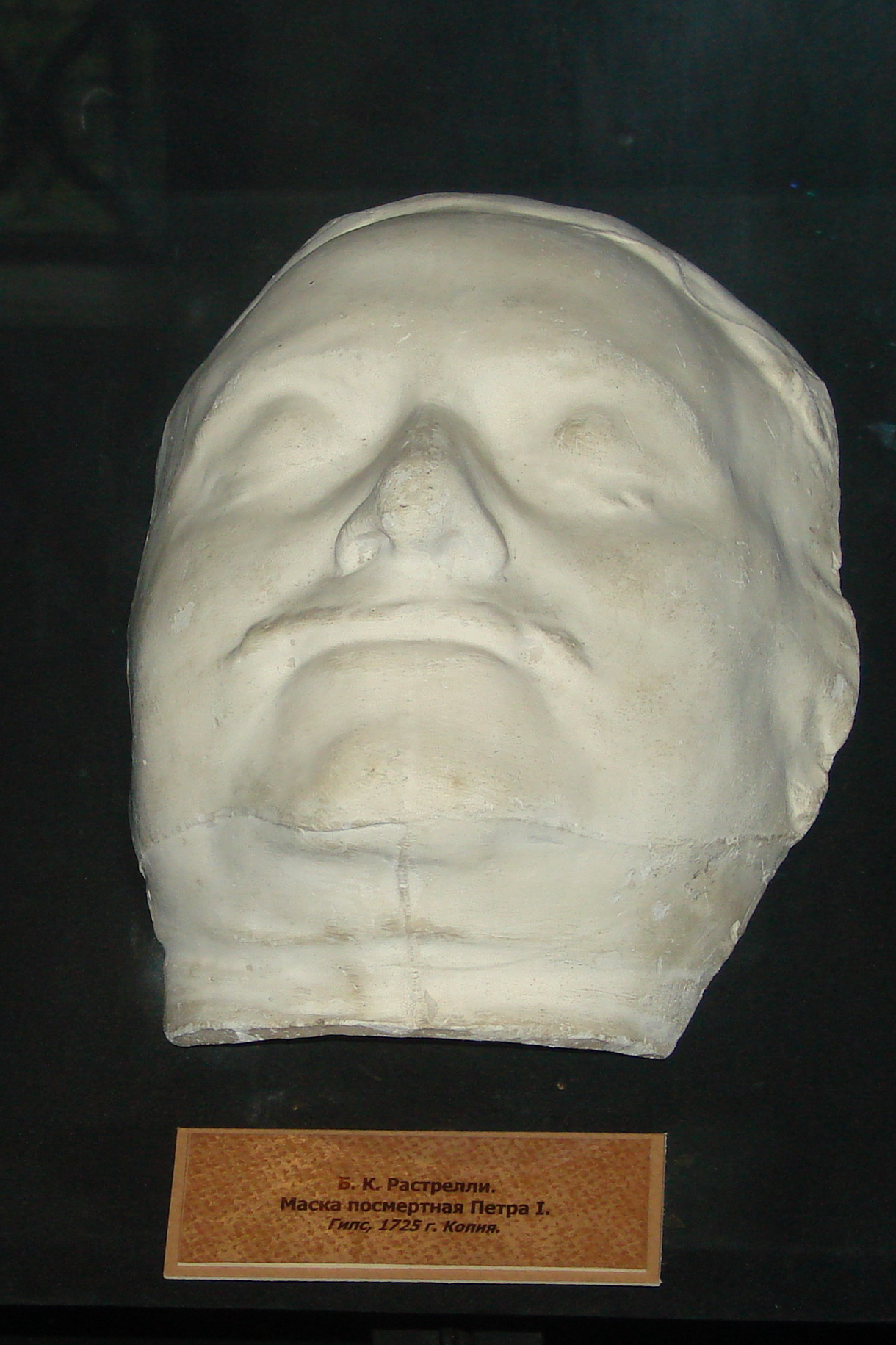
Death mask of Peter the Great

In 1719, Rastrelli made a mask of Peter's face, which he used in his work on three busts of Peter: in bronze (currently in the Hermitage), in wood (for a military ship) and in gilded lead (currently in the Copenhagen Museum). The bronze bust was cast in 1723, and its details were refined in 1729 by an assistant of Rastrelli.

After Peter's death in 1725, Rastrelli made another face mask, as well as molds of his hands and feet; he also accurately measured his body. Using all these details, by the order of Catherine I of Russia, he made a wax-and-wood figure of Peter, which is exhibited in the Hermitage. The mask and figure were later used for several statues of Peter, including the Monument to Peter I (Peter and Paul Fortress) by Mihail Chemiakin.

The figure is clothed in Peter's belongings: a coat, jacket, pants and belt with shoulder strap made from a blue silk cloth and embroidered with silver thread. The blue ribbon of the Order of St. Andrew crosses the chest. The costume has dilapidated over two centuries and was restored in the 1960s. According to records of A. K. Nartov, a mechanic and personal turner of Peter, it was decorated by Catherine and her maids, which is consistent with the examination results of the 1960s.

=== Monument to Peter I (St. Michael's Castle) ===
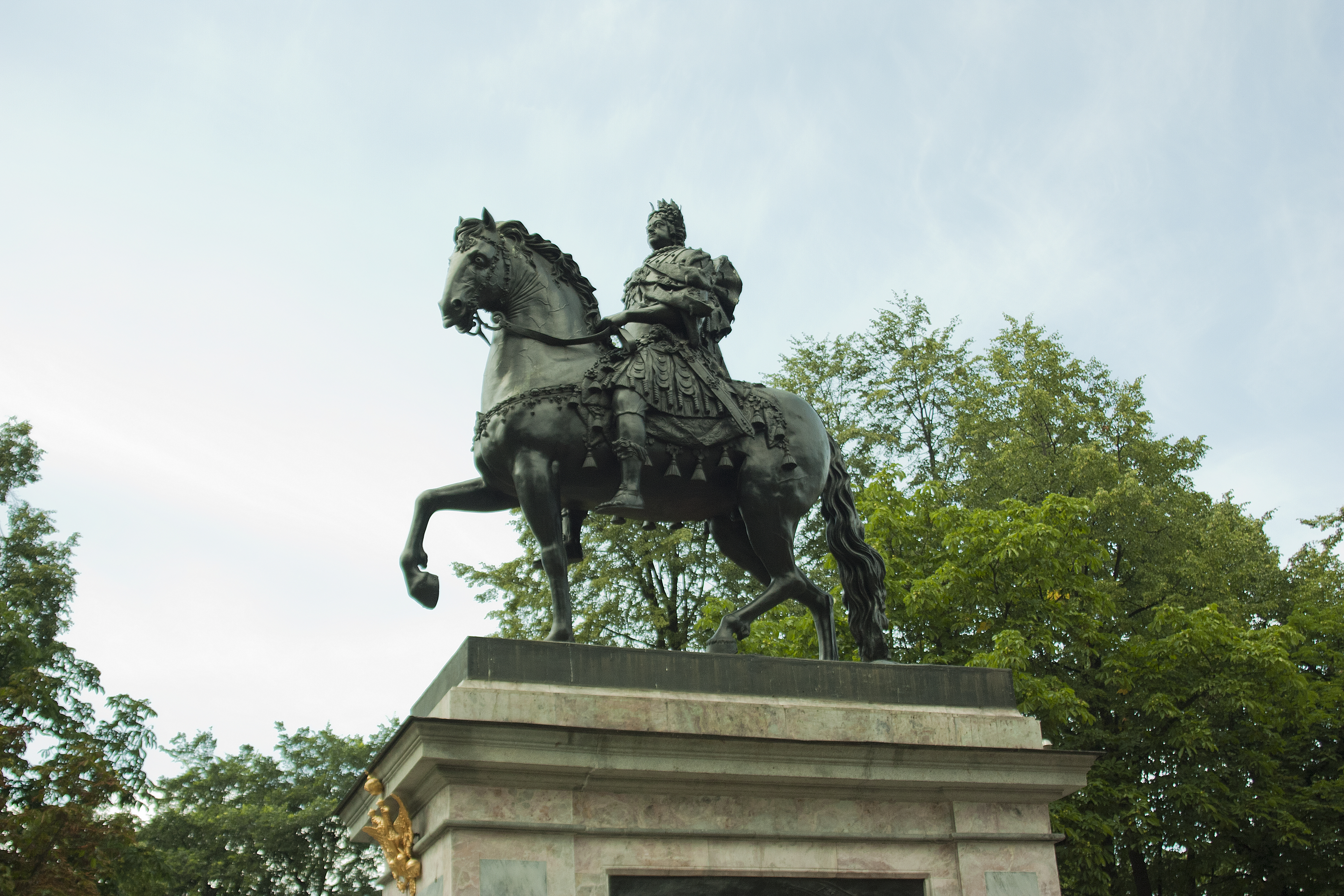
Monument to Peter I at Saint Michael's Castle

In 1716, Peter ordered Rastrelli to build his monument in commemoration of the Russian victories in the Great Northern War. Rastrelli based his work on triumphal statues of the Roman generals. In 1724, he created a model that was approved by Peter, but the construction of the main monument was halted by Peter's death; it was completed only in 1744–46 by his son, after the death of Rastrelli.

Catherine the Great reviewed Rastrelli's work in 1763, but disliked it. Only in 1800, her son Paul installed the monument in front of his Saint Michael's Castle. He ordered to add the inscription "From great grandson to great grandfather" to the pedestal, which was already decorated with bas-reliefs depicting scenes of Russian victories during the Great Northern War.

== Sources ==
- "Растрелли, итальянские художники" . Brockhaus and Efron Encyclopedic Dictionary (in Russian). 1906.
