= Maxim Shubarev =

Maxim Valerievich Shubarev (born May 25, 1968, Leningrad) is a Russian entrepreneur, chairman of the Board of Directors of the Setl Group holding, and vice president of the Self-Regulatory Organization "Association of Builders of St. Petersburg."

== Early life ==
Shubarev was born in 1968 in Saint Petersburg. In 1985, Shubarev graduated from high school and enrolled in the Leningrad Institute of Aircraft Instrument Engineering in the evening department. He served in the Soviet Navy between 1986 and 1989. After completing his military service, he transferred to the Leningrad Polytechnic Institute and earned his degree in Economics and Management of Scientific Research and Design in 1993.

== Career ==
In 1985, Shubarev began working at NPO Leninets as a radio equipment fitter. In 1994, he established the company Petersburg Real Estate and assumed the role of its general director. A year later, Shubarev established the first real estate division within a construction company. By the mid-2000s, the company ranked fifth among developers in St. Petersburg. In 2006, the company was transformed into a holding and was renamed Setl Group, with the former name being transferred to the real estate division. Shubarev subsequently became the chairman of the board of directors, holding a 70 percent ownership stake in the company.

In 2016, the company entered the top three Russian leaders based on the volume of housing delivered. As of January 2017, the structures within Setl Group held the second position in Russia for the volume of housing under construction (over 2 million square meters). The company's revenue increased tenfold from 2011 to 2016, rising from 5.8 billion rubles to 59 billion. As of the end of 2022, the revenue amounted to 149 billion rubles. Since 2020, the company has been included in the list of systemically important organizations in the Russian Federation.

Shubarev led the company's working groups that participated in the restoration of several cultural heritage sites significant for the city and the country, including the Konstantinovsky Palace, the Mikhailovsky Castle, the Church of the Nativity of John the Baptist.

== Public activities ==
From 2005 to 2009, Shubarev served as the president of the North-West Construction-Industrial Complex Association. Between 2008 and 2015, Shubarev was the president of the self-regulatory organization non-profit Association of Builders of St. Petersburg, which was the first construction SRO in the city.

In 2008, he became a member of the expert council for the development of competition in the construction sector and the industry of construction materials at the Federal Antimonopoly Service of the Russian Federation.

In 2009, he joined the National Association of Builders. Since 2010, he has chaired the Committee for Housing and Civil Construction. As of 2023, he is a member of the Presidium of the Union of Industrialists and Entrepreneurs of St. Petersburg.

As of 2017, Shubarev participated in projects of the charitable Center for Special Programs, providing targeted assistance to families of deceased law enforcement officers and veterans. The total amount of funds donated reached 1.9 billion rubles from 2014 to 2023. Among the charitable projects supported by the group under Maxim Shubarev's leadership included projects that helped children with oncological diseases, animal shelters, and persons with severe developmental disorders.

== Awards ==
- Honorary Builder of Russia (2005)
- Merited Builder of St. Petersburg (2023)
- "Form of Good" Award (2023)

== Personal life ==
Shubarev is married and has three children. Some of his hobbies include fishing. He is an advocate for the preservation of historical buildings in the center of St. Petersburg and integrating them into modern urban infrastructure.

As of 2023, he ranks 9th in the list of the wealthiest people in St. Petersburg; Delovoy Peterburg estimated his wealth at 94.44 billion rubles.
