= List of Russian Nobel laureates =

The Nobel Prizes are five separate prizes that, according to Alfred Nobel's will of 1895, are awarded to "those who, during the preceding year, have conferred the greatest benefit to Mankind."

This list encompasses all 28 laureates of the Nobel Prize who were citizens of Russia or the Russian Empire, or were citizens of these countries, studied there, and had their citizenship removed for various reasons at the time of receiving the award, or at another time during their life.

Regarding the Russian Empire and the Soviet Union, several individuals who were born in or related to it were omitted because, apart from being born in the Russian Empire or in the USSR, they had little or no connection to modern-day Russia (they did not study there and left at an early age, or were born in parts of the former USSR that are not part of present-day Russia and did not study in modern-day Russia). These individuals are: Marie Curie, Wilhelm Ostwald, Władysław Reymont, Paul Karrer, Frans Eemil Sillanpää, Artturi Ilmari Virtanen, Tadeusz Reichstein, Selman Waksman, Ragnar Granit, Isaac Bashevis Singer, Czesław Miłosz, Joseph Rotblat, Leonid Hurwicz, Menachem Begin, Ilya Prigogine, Simon Kuznets, Svetlana Alexievich, and Ales Bialiatski. Lot of them were born in Congress Poland or the Grand Duchy of Finland, which were not sovereign states at the time of their birth, but (semi)-autonomous parts of the Russian Empire.

However, Henryk Sienkiewicz was included despite listed as Polish by the Nobel Committee: he was born, lived and died as Russian Empire subject, and Poland was not a sovereign country during his lifetime. Wassily Leontief was included because, although he was born in Germany, he held Soviet and Russian citizenship and was affiliated with Leningrad University. Of note is that Mikhail Sholokhov is the only citizen of the Soviet Union who received approval from the Soviet government to receive their Nobel Prize in Literature. During the Soviet period, all other Nobel Laureates in Literature or Peace (except Gorbachev) were dissidents or exiles.

== Soviet and Russian laureates ==
Year	Image	Winner	Field	Prize motivation	Notes	Country	Source of information
1904		Ivan Pavlov (1849 – 1936); Russian: Иван Петрович Павлов	Physiology or Medicine	“In recognition of his work on the physiology of digestion, through which knowledge on vital aspects of the subject has been transformed and enlarged”	The first Russian Nobel laureate	Russian Empire	
1905		Henryk Sienkiewicz (1846 – 1916); Russian: Генрих Иосифович Сенкевич	Literature	“because of his outstanding merits as an epic writer”	First actual Russian Nobel laureate in literature, however, he wrote in Polish language and listed as Polish by nationality. Poland was not a sovereign state during his lifetime.	Russian Empire	
1908		Ilya Mechnikov (1845 – 1916); Russian: Илья Ильич Мечников	Physiology or Medicine	“In recognition of their work on immunity”	Metchnikoff shared the 1908 Nobel Prize for Physiology or Medicine with German physician and scientist Paul Ehrlich. Both subjects were awarded for their works regarding immunity.	Russian Empire	
1933		Ivan Bunin (1870 – 1953); Russian: Иван Алексеевич Бунин	Literature	“For the strict artistry with which he has carried on the classical Russian traditions in prose writing”	First Russian Nobel laureate in literature noted as such, was not a citizen of the USSR at that time.	France (exiled)	
1956		Nikolay Semyonov (1896 – 1986); Russian: Николай Николаевич Семёнов	Chemistry	“For their researches into the mechanism of chemical reactions”	First Russian Nobel laureate in Chemistry	Soviet Union	
1958		Boris Pasternak (1890 – 1960); Russian: Борис Пастернак	Literature	“For his important achievement both in contemporary lyrical poetry and in the field of the great Russian epic tradition”	After Pasternak announced acceptance of the prize, the government of the Soviet Union then threatened Pasternak of not being allowed into back into the country if he left to accept it.	Soviet Union	
1958		Igor Tamm (1895 – 1971); Russian: Игорь Евгеньевич Тамм	Physics	“For the discovery and the interpretation of the Cherenkov effect”		Soviet Union	
1958		Ilya Frank (1908 – 1990); Russian: Илья Михайлович Франк	Physics	“For the discovery and the interpretation of the Cherenkov effect”		Soviet Union	
1958		Pavel Cherenkov (1904 – 1990); Russian: Павел Алексеевич Черенков	Physics	“For the discovery and the interpretation of the Cherenkov effect”		Soviet Union	
1962		Lev Landau (1908 – 1968); Russian: Лев Давидович Ландау	Physics	“For his pioneering theories for condensed matter, especially liquid helium”	Landau was awarded for his "pioneering theories for condensed matter, especially liquid helium." He was unable to attend the ceremony in Stockholm, Sweden to receive the prize personally, due to a car accident. Rolf Sulman, the Swedish ambassador in the Soviet Union at the time presented the award to Landau in Moscow in 1962.	Soviet Union	
1964		Nikolay Basov (1922 – 2001); Russian: Николай Геннадиевич Басов	Physics	“For fundamental work in the field of quantum electronics, which has led to the construction of oscillators and amplifiers based on the maser-laser principle”		Soviet Union	
1964		Alexander Prokhorov (1916 – 2002); Russian: Александр Михайлович Прохоров	Physics	“For fundamental work in the field of quantum electronics, which has led to the construction of oscillators and amplifiers based on the maser-laser principle”		Soviet Union	
1965		Mikhail Sholokhov (1905 – 1984); Russian: Михаил Александрович Шолохов	Literature	“For the artistic power and integrity with which, in his epic of the Don, he has given expression to a historic phase in the life of the Russian people”		Soviet Union	
1970		Aleksandr Solzhenitsyn (1918 – 2008); Russian: Александр Исаевич Солженицын	Literature	“For the ethical force with which he has pursued the indispensable traditions of Russian literature”	Solzhenitsyn was expelled from the Soviet Union in 1974.	Soviet Union	
1973		Wassily Leontief (1905 – 1999); Russian: Василий Васильевич Леонтьев	Economics	“For the development of the input-output method and for its application to important economic problems”	First Russian Nobel laureate in Economics	United States	
1975		Andrei Sakharov (1921 – 1989); Russian: Андрей Дмитриевич Сахаров	Peace	“For his struggle for human rights in the Soviet Union, for disarmament and cooperation between all nations”	First Russian nobel laureate in Peace	Soviet Union	
1975		Leonid Kantorovich (1912 – 1986); Russian: Леонид Витальевич Канторович	Economics	“For their contributions to the theory of optimum allocation of resources”		Soviet Union	
1978		Pyotr Kapitsa (1894 – 1984); Russian: Пётр Леонидович Капица	Physics	“For his basic inventions and discoveries in the area of low-temperature physics”		Soviet Union	
1987		Joseph Brodsky (1940 – 1996); Russian: Иосиф Александрович Бродский	Literature	“For an all-embracing authorship, imbued with clarity of thought and poetic intensity”	He was not a citizen of the USSR from 1972	United States	
1990		Mikhail Gorbachev (1931 – 2022); Russian: Михаил Сергеевич Горбачёв	Peace	“For the leading role he played in the radical changes in East-West relations”		Soviet Union	
2000		Zhores Alferov (1930 – 2019); Belarusian: Жарэс Іванавіч Алфёра	Physics	“For developing semiconductor heterostructures used in high-speed- and opto-electronics”	Alferov shared the 2000 Nobel Prize in Physics with Jack S. Kilby and Herbert Kroemer, both American physicists, for "basic work on information and communication technology".	Russia	
2003		Alexei Alexeyevich Abrikosov (1928 – 2017); Belarusian: Алексей Алексеевич Абрикосов	Physics	“For pioneering contributions to the theory of superconductors and superfluids”		Russia /United States	
2003		Vitaly Ginzburg (1916 – 2009); Russian: Виталий Лазаревич Гинзбург	Physics	“For pioneering contributions to the theory of superconductors and superfluids”		Russia	
2010		Andre Geim (род. 1958); Russian: Андрей Константинович Гейм	Physics	“For groundbreaking experiments regarding the two-dimensional material graphene”		United Kingdom /Netherlands	
2010		Konstantin Novoselov (род. 1974); Russian: Константин Сергеевич Новосёлов	Physics	“For groundbreaking experiments regarding the two-dimensional material graphene”		United Kingdom /Russia	
2021		Dmitry Muratov (род. 1961); Russian: Дмитрий Андреевич Муратов	Peace	“For their efforts to safeguard freedom of expression, which is a precondition for democracy and lasting peace”	Muratov shared the 2021 Nobel Peace Prize with Filipino-American journalist and author Maria Ressa.	Russia	
2022		Memorial (осн. 1987); Russian: Мемориал	Peace	“The Peace Prize laureates represent civil society in their home countries. They have for many years promoted the right to criticise power and protect the fundamental rights of citizens. They have made an outstanding effort to document war crimes, human right abuses and the abuse of power. Together they demonstrate the significance of civil society for peace and democracy”	Memorial is an international human rights organisation, founded and originally headquartered in Russia, although it was already banned in Russia in 2021 before the Nobel Prize was awarded to it, and moved abroad.	Russia	
2023		Alexey Ekimov	Chemistry	"for the discovery and synthesis of quantum dots"		Russia	
