= Mikhail Sholokhov =

Russian writer (1905–1984)

- Михаил Шолохов
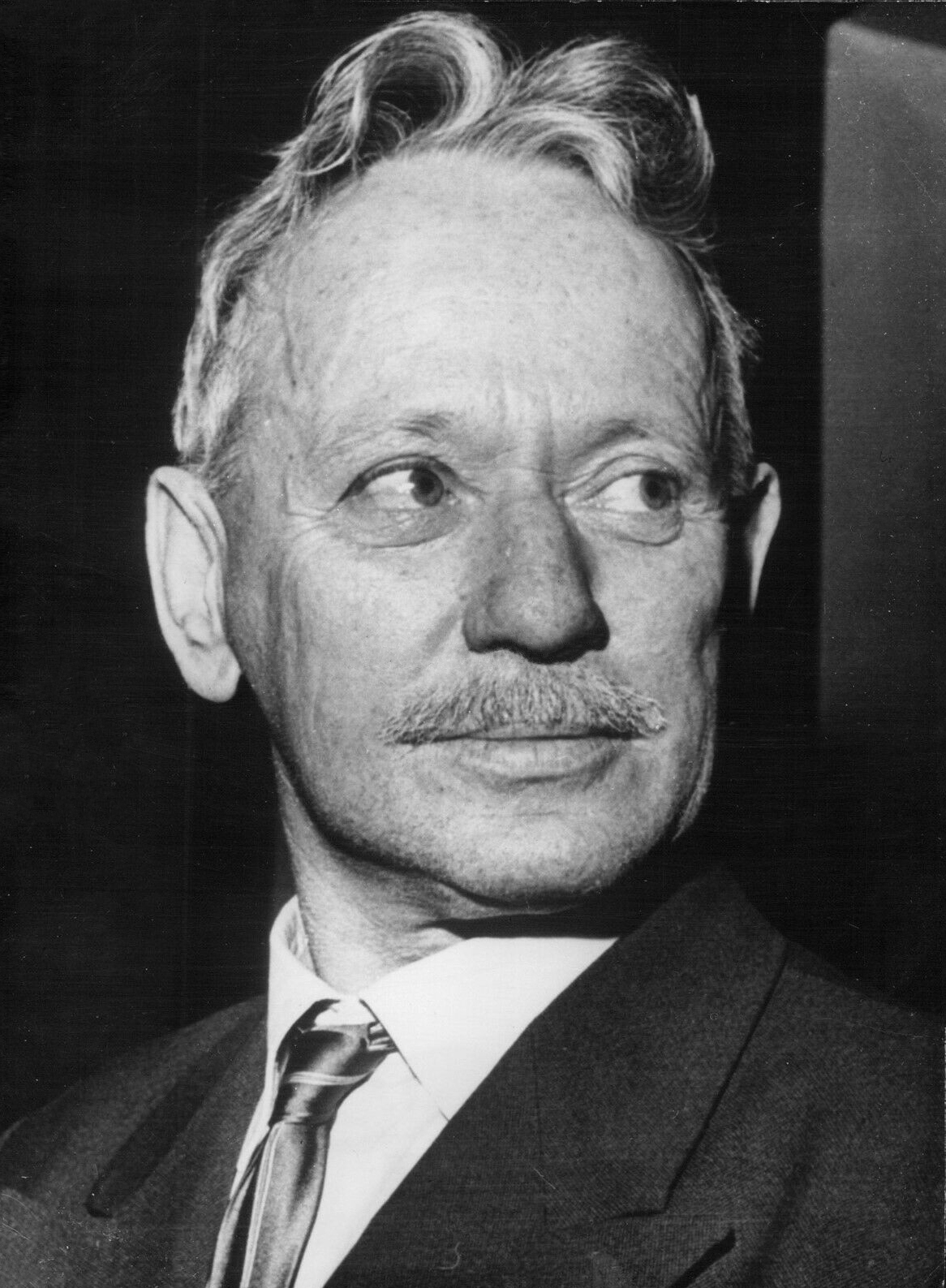
- Sholokhov in 1960
- Born: Mikhail Aleksandrovich Sholokhov; 24 May 1905; Vyoshenskaya, Donetsky district, Don Host Oblast, Russian Empire
- Died: 21 February 1984 (aged 78); Vyoshenskaya, Rostov Oblast, Russian SFSR, Soviet Union
- Occupations: Novelist; short story writer
- Years active: 1922–1984
- Spouse: Maria Petrovna Sholokhova (m. 1924)
- Awards: Nobel Prize in Literature (1965); Lenin Prize (1960); Stalin Prize (1941)
- Military career
- Branch: Red Army
- Service years: 1917–1922
- Conflicts: Russian Civil War

Mikhail Aleksandrovich Sholokhov (Russian: Михаил Александрович Шолохов, IPA: [ˈʂoləxəf]; 24 May [O.S. 11 May] 1905 – 21 February 1984) was a Russian novelist and winner of the 1965 Nobel Prize in Literature. He is known for writing about life and fate of Don Cossacks during the Russian Revolution, the civil war and the period of collectivization, primarily in his most famous novel, And Quiet Flows the Don.

== Early life and education ==
Sholokhov was born in the Russian Empire, in the "land of the Cossacks" – the Kruzhilin hamlet, part of stanitsa Vyoshenskaya, in the former Administrative Region of the Don Cossack Host. His father, a Russian, Aleksander Mikhailovich Sholokhov (1865–1925), was a member of the lower middle class, at various times a farmer, a cattle trader, and a miller. Sholokhov's mother, Anastasia Danilovna Chernikova (1871–1942), the widow of a Cossack, came from Ukrainian peasant stock (her father was a peasant in the Chernihiv oblast). She did not become literate until a time in her life when she wanted to correspond with her son. His family were not Don Cossacks, but inogorodnye ("outlanders"), the rather disparaging term used by the Don Cossacks for outsiders who settled in their territory by the banks of the Don. The inogorodnye tended to be much poorer than the Don Cossacks and were excluded from voting for officials in the Host government (the Don Cossack Host were allowed to elect their leaders, except for the ataman who headed the Host, who was always appointed by the Emperor).

Sholokhov attended schools in Karginskaya, Moscow, Boguchar, and Veshenskaya until 1918, when he joined the Bolshevik side in the Russian Civil War at the age of 13. He spent the next few years fighting. During the Russian Civil War, the inogorodnye tended to support the Reds while the Don Cossacks tended to support the Whites.

== Career ==
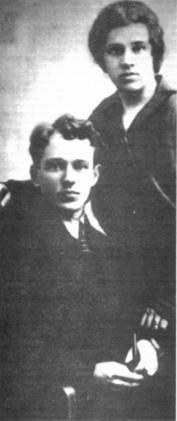
Mikhail Sholokhov and his wife, 1924

Sholokhov began writing at 17. He completed his first literary work, the short story "The Birthmark", at 19. In 1922 Sholokhov moved to Moscow to become a journalist, but had to support himself through manual labour. He was a stevedore, a stonemason, and an accountant from 1922 to 1924, but he also intermittently participated in writers' "seminars". His first published work was a satirical article, The Test (19 October 1923). In 1924 Sholokhov returned to Veshenskaya and devoted himself entirely to writing. In the same year he married Maria Petrovna Gromoslavskaia (1901–1992), the daughter of Pyotr Gromoslavsky, the ataman of Bukanovskaya village. They had two daughters and two sons.

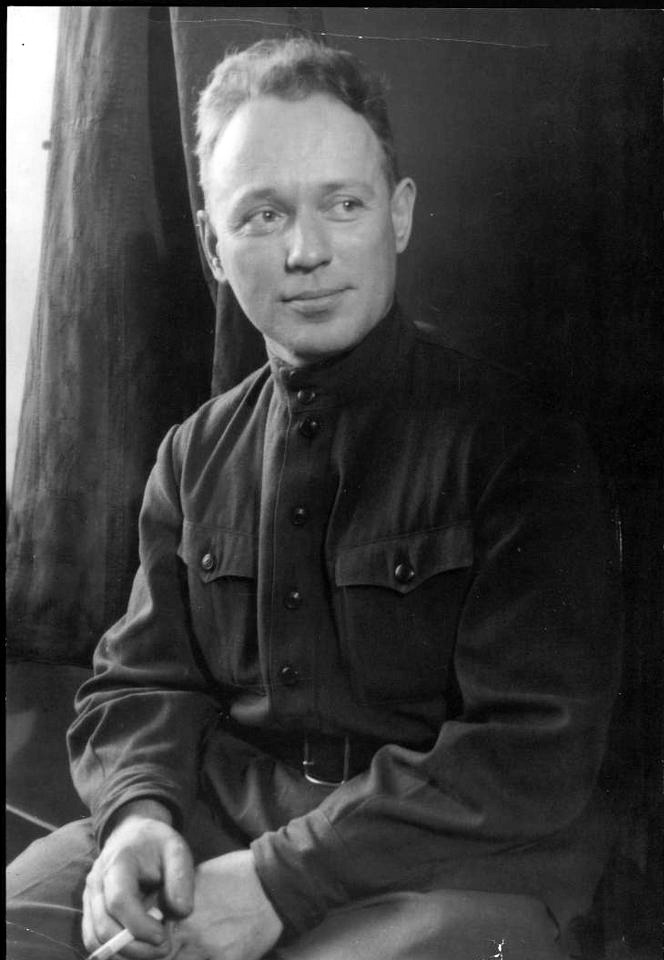
Sholokhov in the late 1930s

Sholokhov's first book was Tales from the Don, a collection of stories largely based on his personal experiences in his native region during World War I and the Russian Civil War; it was published in 1926. The story "Nakhalyonok", partly based on his own childhood, was later made into a popular film.

In the same year, Sholokhov began writing And Quiet Flows the Don, which took him fourteen years to complete (1926–1940). It earned him the 1941 State Stalin Prize. It deals with the experiences of the Cossacks before and during World War I and the Russian Civil War.

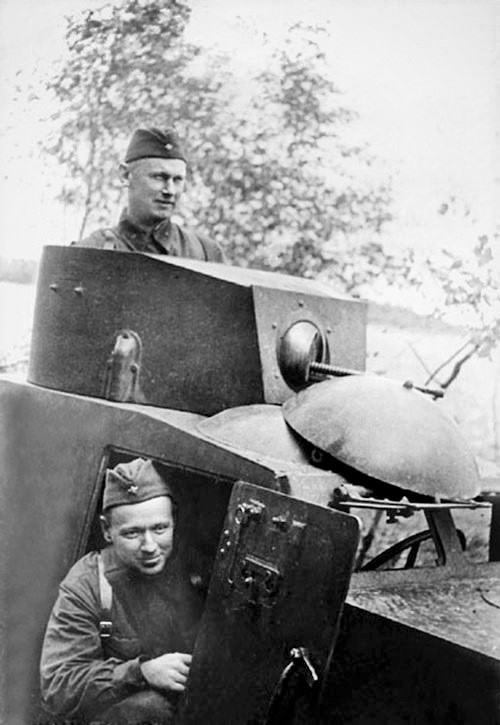
Writers Mikhail Sholokhov (in the drivers seat) and Alexander Fadeyev (in the seat of the turret gunner). Eastern Front, September 1941

Another novel, Virgin Soil Upturned, which earned a Lenin Prize, took 28 years to complete. It is composed of two parts, Seeds of Tomorrow (1932) and Harvest on the Don (1960), and reflects life during collectivization in the Don area. It was heralded as a powerful example of socialist realism. Virgin Soil Upturned was translated and widely read in China, where it influenced China's socialist literature.

The short story "The Fate of a Man" (1957) was made into a popular Russian film. During World War II, Sholokhov wrote about the Soviet war effort for various journals. He also covered the devastation caused by Wehrmacht troops along the Don. His mother was killed when Veshenskaya was bombed in 1942.

Sholokhov's unfinished novel They Fought for Their Country is about World War II (known in the Soviet Union, and now in Russia, as the Great Patriotic War). The book is the source for a 1975 film.

Sholokhov's collected works were published in eight volumes between 1956 and 1960, and he was awarded the Nobel Prize in Literature in 1965.

== Authorship of texts ==
First rumors of Sholokhov's supposed plagiarism appeared in 1928 following the success of the first two volumes of And Quiet Flows the Don: it was speculated that the author stole the manuscript from a dead White Army officer. Sholokhov asked the Pravda newspaper to prove his authorship, submitting his manuscripts of the first three volumes of And Quiet Flows the Don and the plan of the fourth one. In 1929 a special commission was formed that accepted Sholokhov's authorship. In the conclusion signed by four experts, the commission stated that there was no evidence of plagiarism on the one hand, and on the other hand the manuscripts' style was close to that of Sholokhov's previous book, Tales from the Don.

The allegations resurfaced in the 1960s with Aleksandr Solzhenitsyn as a notable proponent, possibly in retaliation for Sholokhov's scathing opinion of Solzhenitsyn's novella One Day in the Life of Ivan Denisovich. Several other writers have been proposed as the 'original' author, although Fyodor Kryukov, a Cossack and Anti-Bolshevik who had died in 1920 has emerged as the leading candidate.

In 1984 Norwegian Slavicist and mathematician Geir Kjetsaa, in a monograph written with three other colleagues, provided statistical analyses of sentence lengths showing that Mikhail Sholokhov was likely the true author of And Quiet Flows the Don.

The debate focused on the published book, because Sholokhov's archive was destroyed in a bomb raid during the Second World War and no manuscript material or drafts were known. 143 pages of the manuscript of the 3rd and 4th books were later found and returned to Sholokhov; since 1975, they have been held by the Pushkin House in St Petersburg. Then, in 1987, several hundred pages of notes and drafts of the work were discovered, including chapters excluded from the final draft. The writing paper dates back to the 1920s: 605 pages are in Sholokhov's own hand, and 285 are transcribed by his wife, Maria, and sisters. Sholokhov had had his friend Vassily Kudashov look after it, and after he was killed at war his widow took possession of the manuscript, but she never disclosed it. The manuscript was finally obtained by the Institute of World Literature of the Russian Academy of Sciences in 1999 with assistance from the Russian government.

In 1999 the Russian Academy of Science carried out an analysis of the manuscript and came to the conclusion that And Quiet Flows the Don had been written by Sholokhov himself. A lengthy analysis by Felix Kuznetsov of the creative process visible in the papers provides detailed support for Sholokhov's authorship.

During the 2000s a Russian-Israeli linguist Zeev Bar-Sella once again stated that Sholokhov was not the true author of And Quiet Flows the Don as well as the other works attributed to him. Based on his own textual analysis of the novel he asserts that the manuscripts were written by Sholokhov not earlier than 1929 and names the writer Viktor Sevsky (real name Veniamin Krasnushkin) as the true author.

== Political and social activity ==
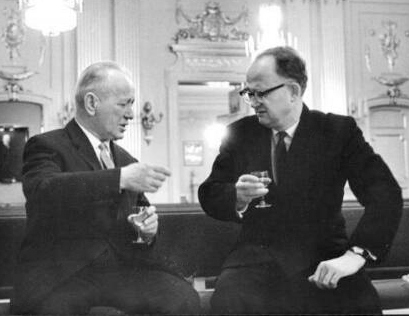
Sholokhov (left) with the Soviet ambassador Nikolai Belokhvostikov at the Nobel Prize ceremonies in 1965

Sholokhov met Joseph Stalin in 1930, and subsequently was one of very few people who chose to give the leader a truthful account of what was happening in the country and nonetheless was not punished. In the 1930s, he wrote several letters to Stalin from his home in Veshenskaya about the appalling conditions in the kolkhozes and sovkhozes along the Don, requesting assistance for the farmers. In January 1931, he warned: "Comrade Stalin, without exaggeration, conditions are catastrophic!" On 4 April 1933, he sent a long letter in which, among many other details, he named two OGPU officers whom he accused of torturing prisoners from his district. Stalin reacted by sending a senior official, Matvei Shkiryatov, to investigate. The two officers were arrested and sentenced to death; their sentences were later revoked, but they were banned from working in Sholokhov's home village. Stalin also arranged for extra food to be sent to Veshenskaya and the neighbouring district.

Sholokhov joined the CPSU in 1932, and in 1937 he was elected to the Supreme Soviet of the Soviet Union. In August 1937, his best friend, the secretary of the Veshenskaya party committee, P.K. Lugovoi, was arrested. Sholokohov was due to take part in an international writers' conference, but he refused to leave the country while Lugovoi was being held. Stalin sent another official, Vladimir Stavsky, to investigate, and invited Sholokhov to visit him in the Kremlin. After their meeting, on 4 November 1937, Lugovoi and two other prisoners on whose behalf Sholokhov had interceded were released, but in a subsequent letter to Stalin, he complained that the people responsible for wrongfully arresting them had not been punished.

On a visit to Moscow in 1938, Sholokhov met Yevgenia Yezhova, wife of Nikolai Yezhov, the People's Commissar for Internal Affairs (NKVD), and checked into a hotel room with her, unaware that the room was bugged. Yezhov heard the recording and attacked Yezhova. On 23 October 1938, Sholokhov met Stalin in the Kremlin to complain that he had been put under surveillance in Veshenskaya, but when Yezhov was summoned to explain, he claimed not to know why. They met again on 31 October: this time the officer who had been investigating Sholokhov was also summoned. He said his orders had come from Moscow, but Yezhov again denied giving the order. Sholokhov claimed that he completed the fourth and last volume of And Quiet Flows the Don and its sequel on 21 December 1939, the day when the USSR was celebrating what was supposedly Stalin's 60th birthday, and celebrated by opening a bottle of wine that Stalin had given him. He then wrote to Stalin to say how he had marked the special day.

In 1959 he accompanied Soviet Premier Nikita Khrushchev on a trip to Europe and the United States. He became a member of the CPSU Central Committee in 1961, Academician of the USSR Academy of Sciences in 1939, and was a member of the USSR Supreme Soviet. He was twice awarded the title of Hero of Socialist Labor, and later became vice president of the Union of Soviet Writers.

He commented on the Sinyavsky–Daniel trial at the 23rd Congress by saying that the prison terms meted out to Sinyavsky and Daniel had been much too lenient compared to the "revolutionary understanding of what is right" during the 1920s, which turned part of the Soviet intelligentsia against him and resulted in two open letters by Lydia Chukovskaya and Yuri Galanskov addressed to Sholokhov.

== Later life and death ==
Sholokhov almost stopped writing after 1969 and spent the late years at the Vyoshenskaya stanitsa. He used his Order of Lenin money to build a local school and his Nobel Prize to take the family on a road trip over Europe and Japan. In 1972 he became a vocal critic of Alexander Yakovlev, then a head of the Central Committee Propaganda Department, and Yakovlev’s article, "Against Antihistoricism" which attacked Russian nationalism; this resulted in a Politburo meeting and removal of Yakovlev from his position (he was then sent as an ambassador to Canada).

Mikhail Sholokhov died on 21 February 1984, from laryngeal cancer. He was buried in the grounds of his house at the Vyoshenskaya stanitsa along with his wife Maria Petrovna Sholokhova (née Gromoslavskaya; 1902—1992).

== Honours and awards ==
Soviet Union

Hero of Socialist Labor, twice (1967, 1980)
Six Orders of Lenin (1939, 1955, 1965, 1967, 1975, 1980)
Order of the October Revolution (1972)
Order of the Patriotic War, 1st class (1945)
Jubilee Medal "In Commemoration of the 100th Anniversary of the Birth of Vladimir Ilyich Lenin" (1970)
Medal "For the Defence of Stalingrad" (1942)
Medal "For the Defence of Moscow" (1944)
Medal "For the Victory over Germany in the Great Patriotic War 1941–1945" (1945)
Medal "For Valiant Labour in the Great Patriotic War 1941–1945" (1945)
Jubilee Medal "Twenty Years of Victory in the Great Patriotic War 1941-1945" (1965)
Jubilee Medal "Thirty Years of Victory in the Great Patriotic War 1941–1945" (1975)
Medal "Veteran of Labour" (1974)

Foreign

Grand Master of the Order of Cyril and Methodius (Bulgaria)
Order of Georgi Dimitrov (Bulgaria)
Star of People's Friendship (East Germany)
Order of Sukhbaatar (Mongolia)

== Legacy ==
- An asteroid in main-belt is named after him, 2448 Sholokhov.
- Sholokhov Moscow State University for Humanities bears his name.
- His house at the Vyoshenskaya stanitsa was turned into the National Sholokhov Museum-Reserve.
- Monuments in Moscow and Rostov-on-Don.
- Grigory and Aksinya and Grigory and Aksinya in a boat sculptures in the Vyoshenskaya stanitsa and Rostov-on-Don, respectively.
- The Moscow National Guard Presidential Cadets School is named after him.

== Selected publications ==
- Donskie Rasskazy, 1925 – Tales of the Don.
- Lazorevaja Step, 1926.
- Tikhii Don, 4 vol., 1928–1940 (The Quiet Don) – And Quiet Flows the Don (1934); The Don Flows Home to the Sea (1940); Quiet Flows the Don (1966). A three-part film version, directed by Sergei Gerasimov and starring P. Glebov, L. Khityaeva, Z. Kirienko and E. Bystrltskaya, was produced in 1957–1958.
- Podnyataya Tselina, 1932–1960 – Virgin Soil Upturned (1935); Harvest on the Don (1960).
- Oni Srazhalis Za Rodinu, 1942 – They Fought for Their Country.
- Nauka Nenavisti, 1942 – Hate / The Science of Hatred.
- Slovo O Rodine, 1951.
- Sudba Cheloveka, 1956–1957 – Fate of a Man. A film version, Destiny of a Man, directed by Sergei Bondarchuk and starring Sergei Bondarchuk, Pavlik Boriskin, Zinaida Kirienko, Pavel Volkov, Yuri Avelin, and K. Alekseev, was produced in 1959.
- Sobranie Sochinenii, 1956–1958 – collected works (8 vols.)
- Oni Srazhalis Za Rodinu, 1959 – They Fought for their Country
- Sobranie Sochinenii, 1962 – collected works (8 vols.)
- Early Stories, 1966.
- One Man's Destiny, and Other Stories, Articles, and Sketches, 1923–1963, 1967
- Fierce and Gentle Warriors, 1967.
- Po Veleniju Duši, 1970 – At the Bidding of the Heart
- Sobranie Sochinenii, 1975 (8 vols.)
- Rossiya V Serdtse, 1975.
- SLOVO O RODINE, 1980.
- Collected Works, 1984 (8 vols.)
- Sobranie Sochinenii, 1985 (collected works) (8 vols.)
- Sholokhov I Stalin, 1994.

== See also ==
- List of Russian Nobel laureates
