= Fyodor Kryukov =

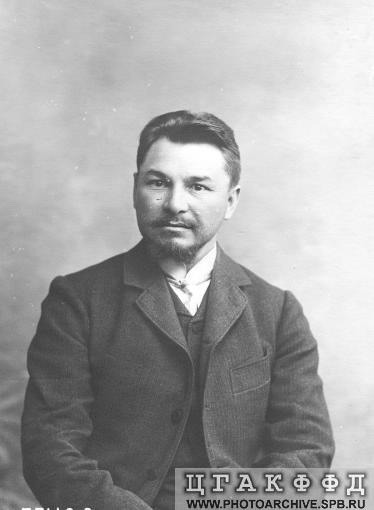
Fyodor Kryukov. 1906.

Fyodor Dmitrievich Kryukov (Russian: Фёдор Дми́триевич Крю́ков, IPA: [ˈfʲɵdər ˈdmʲitrʲɪjɪvʲɪtɕ ˈkrʲukəf]; 2/14 February 1870, Glazunovskaya, Don Host Oblast — 4 March 1920) was a Cossack writer and soldier in the White Army, died in 1920 of typhoid fever. Various literary critics, most notably Aleksandr Solzhenitsyn and Roy Medvedev, claimed that Mikhail Sholokov plagiarised his work in order to write major parts of And Quiet Flows the Don. This was also the conclusion of a statistical analysis by V. P. and T. G. Fomenko. Their conclusion has been questioned by a more recent analysis. Ze'ev Bar-Sela believes that although the book was plagiarised, it was plagiarised from Venyamin Alekseevich Krasnushkin, and not from Kryukov. A 1984 monograph by Geir Kjetsaa and others concluded through statistical analyses that Sholokhov was the likely author of Don.

In 1987, several thousand pages of notes and drafts of the work were discovered and authenticated, including chapters excluded from the final draft.

During the Second World War, Sholokhov's archive was destroyed in a bomb raid, and only the fourth volume survived. Sholokhov had his friend Vassily Kudashov, who was killed in the war, look after it. Following Kudashov's death, his widow took possession of the manuscript, but she never disclosed the fact of owning it. The manuscript was finally found by the Institute of World Literature of Russia's Academy of Sciences in 1999 with assistance from the Russian Government. The writing paper dates back to the 1920s: 605 pages are in Sholokhov's own hand, and 285 are transcribed by his wife Maria and sisters. However, there are claims that the manuscript is just a copy of Kryukov's manuscript.

Kryukov is mentioned at length in Solzhenitsyn's novel November 1916 where he is called "Fyodor Dmitrievich Kovynev". He was an anti-bolshevik.
