= Monument to Peter I (Peter and Paul Fortress) =

Coordinates: 59.950143°N 30.317909°E

- The monument in 2006
- Interactive map of Monument to Peter I
- Location: Saint Petersburg, Russia
- Designer: Mihail Chemiakin
- Type: Statue
- Material: Bronze

The Monument to Peter I (Russian: Памятник Петру I) in the Peter and Paul Fortress in Saint Petersburg, Russia, is a bronze statue by Mihail Chemiakin. It was designed and cast in the United States in the 1980s and donated by Chemiakin to the city. It was installed on 6–7 June 1991.

The monument is 1.90 m (6 ft 3 in) tall and is installed on a granite base with a height of 0.36 m (1 ft 2 in). It depicts Peter sitting on a throne and resembles the wax figure of Peter by Carlo Bartolomeo Rastrelli (1725). Chemiakin made the head of the statue using a life mask of Peter's face taken by Rastrelli in 1719, six years before Peter's death, and this fact is mentioned at the base of the statue. However, he enlarged his other body parts, presenting Peter in a grotesque manner. Therefore, the statue was initially criticized by locals, and had to be guarded to prevent vandalism. Later, Chemiakin's view became gradually accepted.

Chemiakin worked on the statue for eight years and made three versions, two others being located in Normandy, France, and in Claverack, New York, where Chemiakin lived at the time. According to Chemiakin, the idea for making a statue originated from his friend Vladimir Vysotsky. Chemiakin started with the 1:1 proportions of the Rastrelli's wax figure, but gradually elongated the body, approaching the style of Russian icons.
