= Monument to the Don Cossacks =

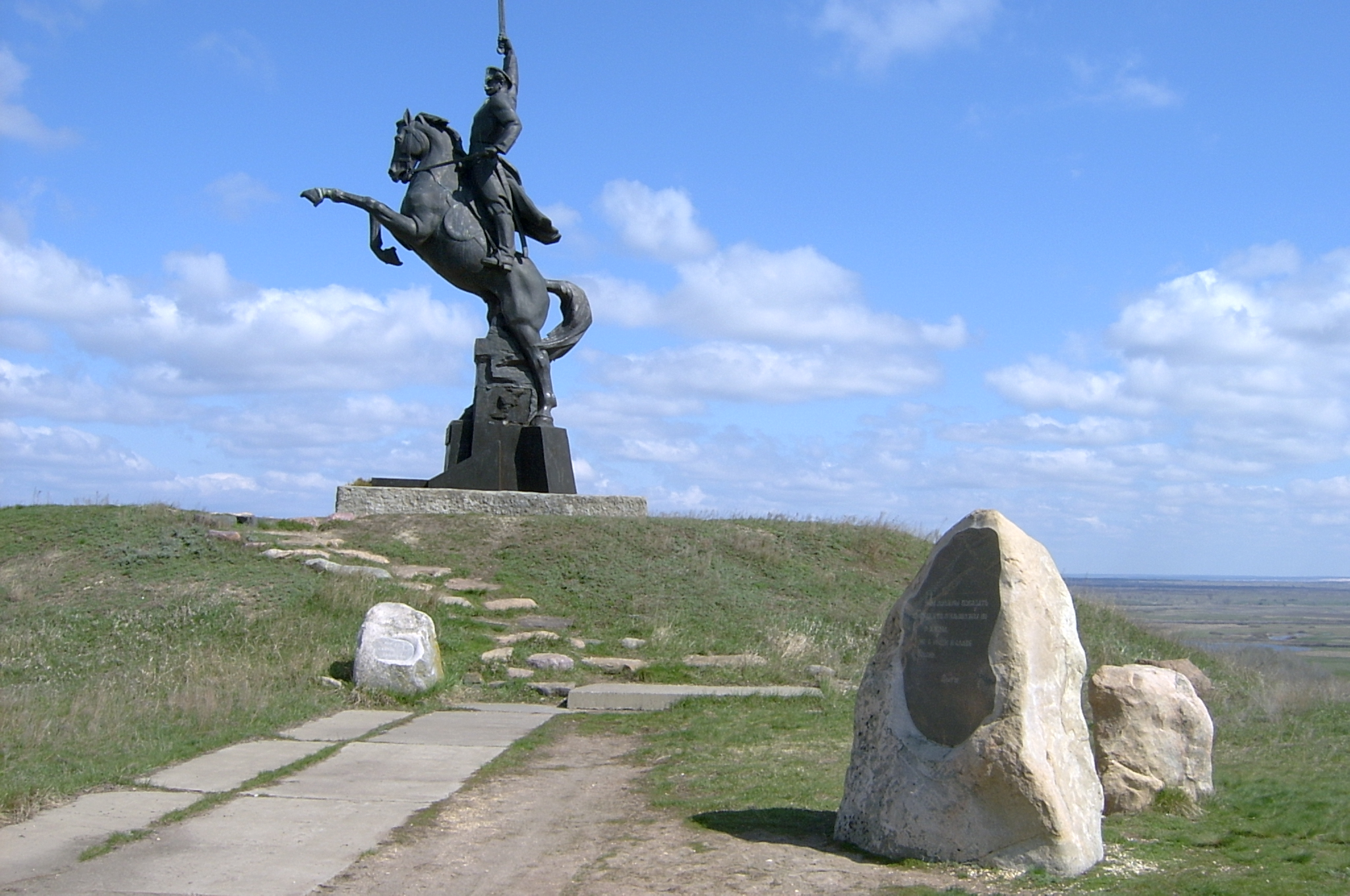
- Monument to Don Cossack, Khoperskaya District.
- Artist: N. Mozhaev
- Year: 1994
- Type: Equestrian Statue
- Location: Khutor of Kruzhilinskiy

The Monument to the Don Cossacks (Russian: Памятник казакам Тихого Дона) is a monument near khutor of Kruzhilinskiy, Rostov oblast, Russia. The monument is located on the R271 highway that runs from Millerovo to Vyoshenskaya. It was designed by sculptors N. Mozhaev, E. Mozhaeva, N. Shcherbakov. The monument was opened in May 1994. It portrays a Don Cossack. The statue is 6 meters tall, not including its 8-metre barrow. In 2015, the Monument to the Don Cossacks was designated a local Heritage Site.

== Description ==
The monument is an 8-ton bronze equestrian statue of the Don Cossack, which stands on poured barrow. The Cossack is dressed in a military great-coat and peaked cap. The sculpture composition was adjusted on a low pedestal. The memorial stone is located at the bottom of this barrow with inscribed phrase: "To the Don Cossacks" (Russian: Казакам Тихого Дона). Сommoners like to call the monument to Grigiry Melechov, who is main character in the epic novel And Quiet Flows the Don.

== History ==
A project of the monument was designed in 1956 in preparation for an exhibition devoted to the 40th anniversary of the October Revolution. A miniature of the monument of 0.70 m height was named "A bugler" (Russian: Трубач), then it was renamed "Eaglet" and "In the Don steppe". Finally name "To the Don Cossacks" was given after the opening in 1995. It was demonstrated on exhibition in Moscow and Brussels. The sculpture was awarded the Lenin Komsomol Prize. It was bought by the Ministry of Culture of the Ukrainian Soviet Socialist Republic and was exhibited in Art museum of Kharkiv. N Mozhaev presented Mikhail Sholokhov the gypsum miniature in 1982.

First Secretary Rostov oblast committee of the Communist Party of the Soviet Union I. Bondarenko offered to mould the monument and to raise it in the north driveway near Rostov-on-Don. The Equestrian Statue was produced at Lugansk Art Production plant. Leningrad plant of artistic casting "Monumentsculptura" made casting in bronze in 1991. The installation was completed by an art production workshop from Kyiv. The opening ceremony of the monument took place in May 1994 and was held in conjunction by the 89th anniversary from birthday of Mikhail Sholokhov.
