= Fate of a Man (film) =

1959 Soviet film

- Directed by: Sergei Bondarchuk
- Written by: Yuri Lukin; Fyodor Shakhmagonov
- Based on: Fate of a Man by Mikhail Sholokhov
- Produced by: Roskino
- Starring: Sergei Bondarchuk; Pavel Boriskin; Zinaida Kiriyenko; Pavel Volkov
- Music by: Veniamin Basner
- Production company: Mosfilm
- Release date: August 1959
- Running time: 103 minutes
- Country: Soviet Union
- Language: Russian

Fate of a Man (Russian: Судьба человека, Sudjba cheloveka), also released as A Man's Destiny and Destiny of a Man, is a 1959 Soviet World War II film adaptation of the short story by Mikhail Sholokhov, and also the directorial debut of Sergei Bondarchuk. In the year of its release it won the Grand Prize at the 1st Moscow International Film Festival.

== Plot ==
With the beginning of the Great Patriotic War, driver-turned-Soviet soldier Andrei Sokolov has to part with his family. In May 1942 he is taken prisoner by the Germans. Sokolov endures the hell of a Nazi concentration camp, but thanks to his courage he avoids execution and finally escapes from captivity behind the front line to his own. On a short front-line vacation to his small homeland Voronezh, he learns that his wife and both daughters have died during the bombing of Voronezh by German aircraft. Of those close to him, only his son remained, who became an officer. On the last day of the war, May 9, Andrei receives news that his son has died.

After the war, the lonely Sokolov works as a truck driver away from his native places - in Uryupinsk (Stalingrad Oblast). There he meets a little boy Vanya, who was left an orphan: the boy's mother died during the bombing, and his father went missing during the war. Sokolov decides to tell the boy that he is his father, and by doing so he gives himself and the boy hope for a new happy family life.

== Cast ==
- Sergei Bondarchuk as Andrei Sokolov
- Pavel Boriskin as Vanya
- Zinaida Kiriyenko as Irina, Sokolov's wife
- Pavel Volkov as Ivan Timofeyevich, Sokolov's neighbor
- Yuri Averin as Müller
- Kirill Alekseyev as German Major
- Pavel Vinnik as Soviet Colonel
- Lev Borisov as platoon
- Georgy Millyar as drunk German soldier
- Yevgeny Morgunov as fat German soldier (uncredited)
