= Bukanovskaya =

Bukanovskaya Букановская
- Stanitsa
- Location within Volgograd Oblast Location within Russia
- Coordinates: 49°40′N 42°19′E
- Country: Russia
- Region: Volgograd Oblast
- District: Kumylzhensky District
- Time zone: UTC+4:00

Bukanovskaya (Russian: Букановская) is a rural locality (a stanitsa) and the administrative center of Bukanovskoye Rural Settlement, Kumylzhensky District, Volgograd Oblast, Russia. The population was 953 as of 2010. There are 13 streets.

== Geography ==
Bukanovskaya is located on the right bank of the Khopyor River, 37 km southwest of Kumylzhenskaya (the district's administrative centre) by road. Zaolkhovsky is the nearest rural locality.
