= Fate of a Man (short story) =

Short story by Michail Sholokhov

- Author: Mikhail Sholokhov
- Original title: Russian: Судьба человека
- Language: Russian
- Genre: Short story
- Publication date: 1956―1957
- Publication place: Russia

"Fate of a Man" (Russian: Судьба человека; Sudba Cheloveka) is a short story written by Soviet Russian writer Mikhail Sholokhov in 1956.

== Plot ==
With the outbreak of the Great Patriotic War, the truck driver Andrey Sokolov has to leave for army and part with his family. In the first months of the war, he gets wounded and is captured by Nazis. In captivity, he experiences all the burdens of a concentration camp. Due to a display of courage that he shows to the camp's chief, when he refuses to drink with him to victory of the Nazis, he avoids execution and, later, runs from Nazis. In a short vacation in his hometown, Sokolov finds out that his beloved wife Irina and both of their daughters were killed during the bombing. He immediately returns to the front, unable to stay in his native town any more. The only relative Andrey still has is his son, who serves as an officer in the army. Right on Victory Day, Andrey receives news that his son was killed on the last day of the war. After the war, lonely Andrei Sokolov doesn't return to his town and works somewhere else. He meets a little boy Vanya, who was left an orphan. His mother died in bombing and his father missed in action. Sokolov tells the boy that he is his father, and this gives the boy (and himself) a hope for a new life.

== Background ==
The plot of the story is based on real events. In the spring of 1946, on hunting Sholokhov met a man who told him this story. Sholokhov was stricken and said: "I'll write a short story about this, I surely will." Ten years later, after reading some short stories by Hemingway and Remarque, Sholokhov wrote "The Fate of a Man" in seven days.

== Film adaptation ==
In 1959, the story was screened by Sergei Bondarchuk, who also played the main role there. The film "Fate of Man" was awarded the main prize at the Moscow Film Festival in 1959 and paved the way for Bondarchuk to big cinema.
