= Saint Michael's Castle =

Former royal residence in Saint Petersburg, Russia

Coordinates: 59.9404°N 30.3377°E

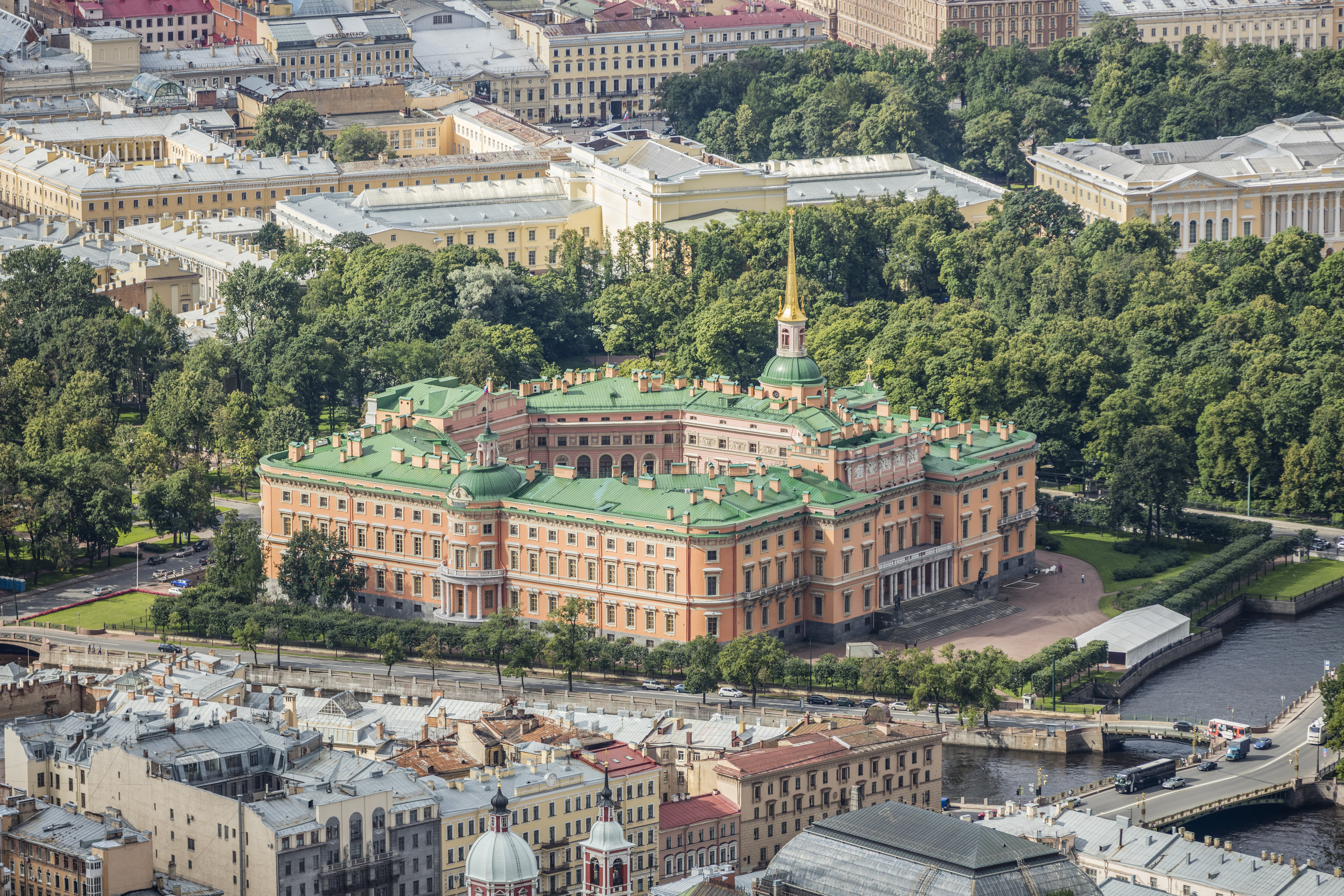
Aerial view of St. Michael's Castle

Saint Michael's Castle (Russian: Миха́йловский за́мок, Mikhailovsky zamok), also called the Mikhailovsky Castle or the Engineers' Castle (Russian: Инженерный замок, Inzhenerny zamok), is a former royal residence in the historic centre of Saint Petersburg, Russia. Saint Michael's Castle was built as a residence for Emperor Paul I of Russia by architects Vincenzo Brenna and Vasily Bazhenov in 1797–1801. It was named for St Michael the Archangel, patron saint of the royal family. The castle looks different from each side, as the architects used motifs of various architectural styles such as French Classicism, Italian Renaissance and Gothic.

Saint Michael's Castle was built to the south of the Summer Garden and replaced the small wooden palace of Empress Elizabeth Petrovna. Afraid of intrigues and assassination plots, Emperor Paul I disliked the Winter Palace where he never felt safe. Due to his personal fascination with medieval knights and his constant fear of assassination, the new royal residence was built like a castle around an octagonal courtyard. The building with rounded corners was surrounded by the waters of the Moika River, the Fontanka River and two specially dug canals (the Church Canal and the Sunday Canal), transforming the castle area into an artificial island which could only be reached by drawbridges.

Construction began on 26 February (N.S. 9 March), 1797 and the castle was solemnly consecrated on 8 November 1800, i.e. on St Michael's Day in the Eastern Orthodox calendar, though finishing work on the interior continued until March 1801. In 1800, the bronze equestrian Monument to Peter the Great was set up in front of the castle. This statue had been designed during Peter the Great's lifetime and later, with the casting being completed in 1747 by the architect Bartolomeo Rastrelli. By order of Paul I, the inscription "From Great Grandson to Great Grandfather" was made on the pedestal that is decorated with bas-reliefs depicting scenes of two Russian victories over Sweden during the Great Northern War.

Paul I was assassinated only 40 nights after he moved into his newly built castle. He was murdered on 12 March 1801, in his own bedroom, by a group of dismissed officers headed by General Bennigsen. The conspirators forced him to a table, and tried to compel him to sign his abdication. Paul offered some resistance, and one of the assassins struck him with a sword, and he was then strangled and trampled to death. He was succeeded by his son, Emperor Alexander I, who was actually in the palace at the time and was informed of his accession by General Nicholas Zubov, one of the assassins.

After Paul's death, the imperial family returned to the Winter Palace; Saint Michael's Castle was abandoned and in 1823 was given to the army's Main Engineering School (later to become the Nikolayevskaya Engineering Academy and now the Military Engineering-Technical University). From then on, the building was known as the Engineers' Castle.

In the early 1990s, Saint Michael's Castle became a branch of the Russian Museum and housed its Portrait Gallery, featuring official portraits of the Russian Emperors and Empresses and various dignitaries and celebrities from the late 17th to the early 20th century. In 1991, the Russian museum began a massive renovation of the Castle. Lasting for over 30 years, the renovation works involved various contractors, including "Vozrozhdenie", "Renessans-Restavratsiya", and "Setl Group". As of 2021, the Russian Museum expected to finish the Castle's renovation in 2024.

== Architecture and design ==
The Castle is oriented as a square with rounded corners, inside the square, there is an octagonal inner courtyard. The main entrance to the castle is to the south. Three angled bridges formed the link between the building and the square of the Connettables in front of it, after the square of the same name in Chantilly, the property of the Princes of Condé that Paul had visited during his stays abroad in June 1782.

The building is located near the source of the Moyka River from the Fontanka. It was originally surrounded by water on all sides. It could be accessed via bridges guarded by sentry guards. The canal on the south side (reconstructed in 2003) came close to the basement. The building was approached from Italian Street through triple semi-circular gates, the middle passage of which was reserved for members of the imperial family. Behind them was a broad, straight avenue, along which were built the stables and the manège (Note: Manège: the French for a riding academy, used as a loan word in Russian: манеж, (or, in Latin script, manezh). From the mid-19th century, with German influence in the military, the Russian form экзерциргауз of the German: Exerzierhaus (lit. "house for exercises") was also used.) It ended at the three-storey corridor pavilions, beyond which the forecourt fortifications began.

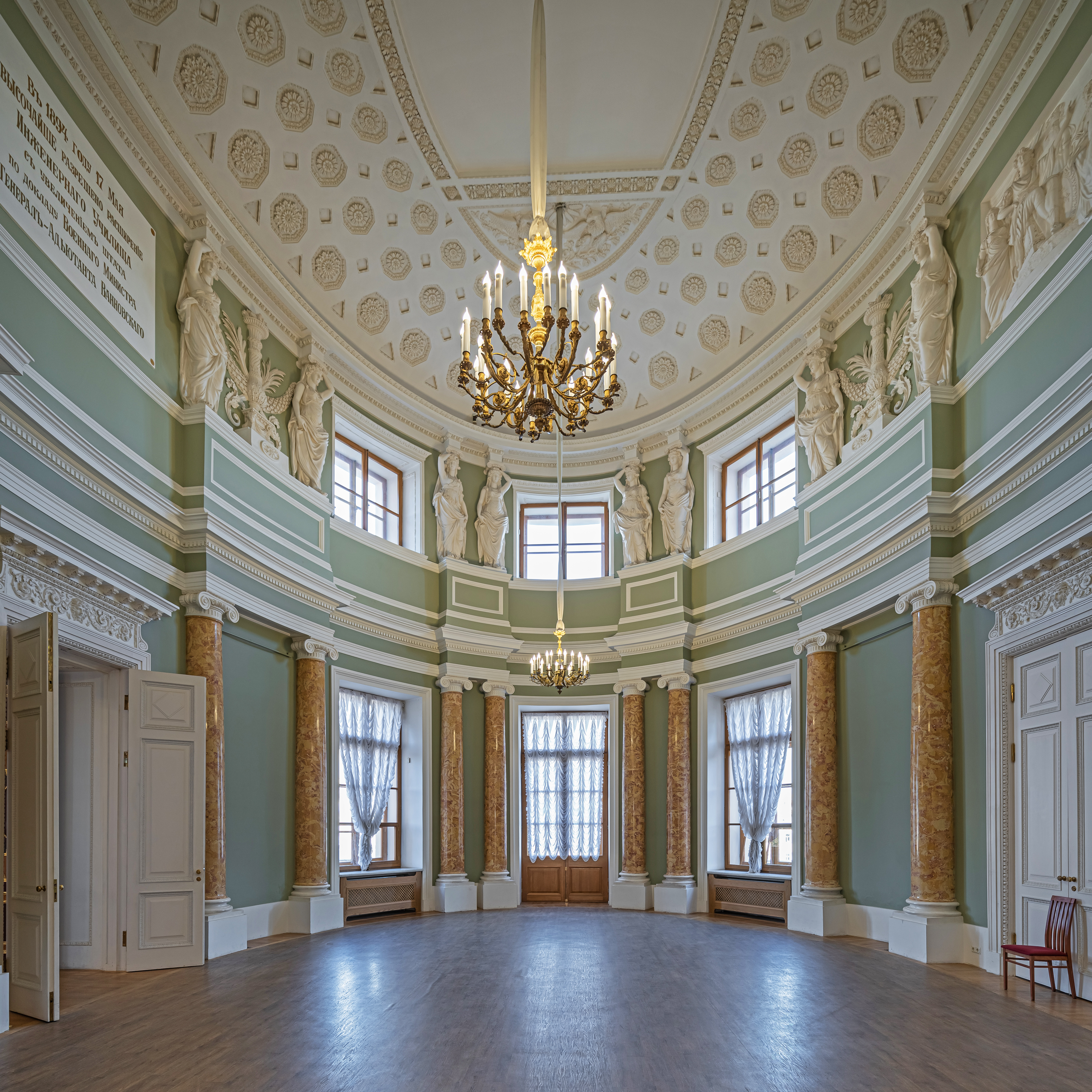
Oval Hall: one of the interiors of St. Michael's Castle

At the end of 1798, Paul I became Grandmaster of the Order of Malta. The appearance of Saint Michael's Castle combined Romantic sentiments and Maltese symbolism. The enclosed volume of the building, the rounded corners associated with the round corner towers, created an image of a citadel of Order of Malta's knights. The development of the composition of the new imperial residence, through a series of variations, led to a square block with an octagonal courtyard which recalls both the round Villa Farnese Palace in Caprarola and its pentagonal external silhouette, by the architect Jacopo Barozzi da Vignola.

The main south façade of the castle follows the arch of the Porte Saint-Denis in Paris, built-in 1672 according to the design of François Blondel the Elder, the founder of French classicism.

It is known that in 1782, while still the heir, Paul was in Parma during his travels in Western Europe, and met with the French architect Petitot. The design of the main façade of the Ducal Palace of Colorno at Parma, commissioned by Ferdinand I of Bourbon, Duke of Parma is an original combination of the composition of the Porte of Saint-Denis, with two obelisks and arches on each side, and the traditional façade of an urban palazzo with a triangular pediment. The facades of the palace in Parma and the castle in Saint Petersburg are almost the same.

The spectacular octagonal courtyard of Saint Michael's Castle has prototypes not only in the classical architecture of Italy (the palace in Caprarola), it goes back to the octagonal early Christian baptisteries. Here, despite its seeming innovativeness, the deep Christian traditions of Saint Petersburg construction can be traced.

Statues in the niches of the southern facade of Saint Michael's Castle are personifications, symbolic of the virtues of the ideal monarch. These include: Power, Abundance, Victory, and Glory, all related to the chivalric symbolism of the Maltese order. The architecture of the colonnade of the state passage through the southern gate and the main staircase of Saint Michael's Castle correlates with similar compositions from Baroque Western Europe, such as the Royal Palace of Caserta near Naples by Luigi Vanvitelli.

The mix of classicist and baroque motifs in the architecture of Saint Michael's Castle places it in a transitional period in the history of architectural styles in Russia. The classicist elements, together with Romantic ones, make up a peculiar "costumed architecture" in Saint Michael's Castle, which anticipates the Empire style of the early nineteenth century. Sometimes the turn of the eighteenth and nineteenth centuries is called pre-Romanticism in Russian art history, but in this case, it would be more accurate to say that the unique appearance of the Saint Michael's Castle represents not only pre-Romantic or Romantic architecture but is above all an architectural portrait of the Emperor himself.

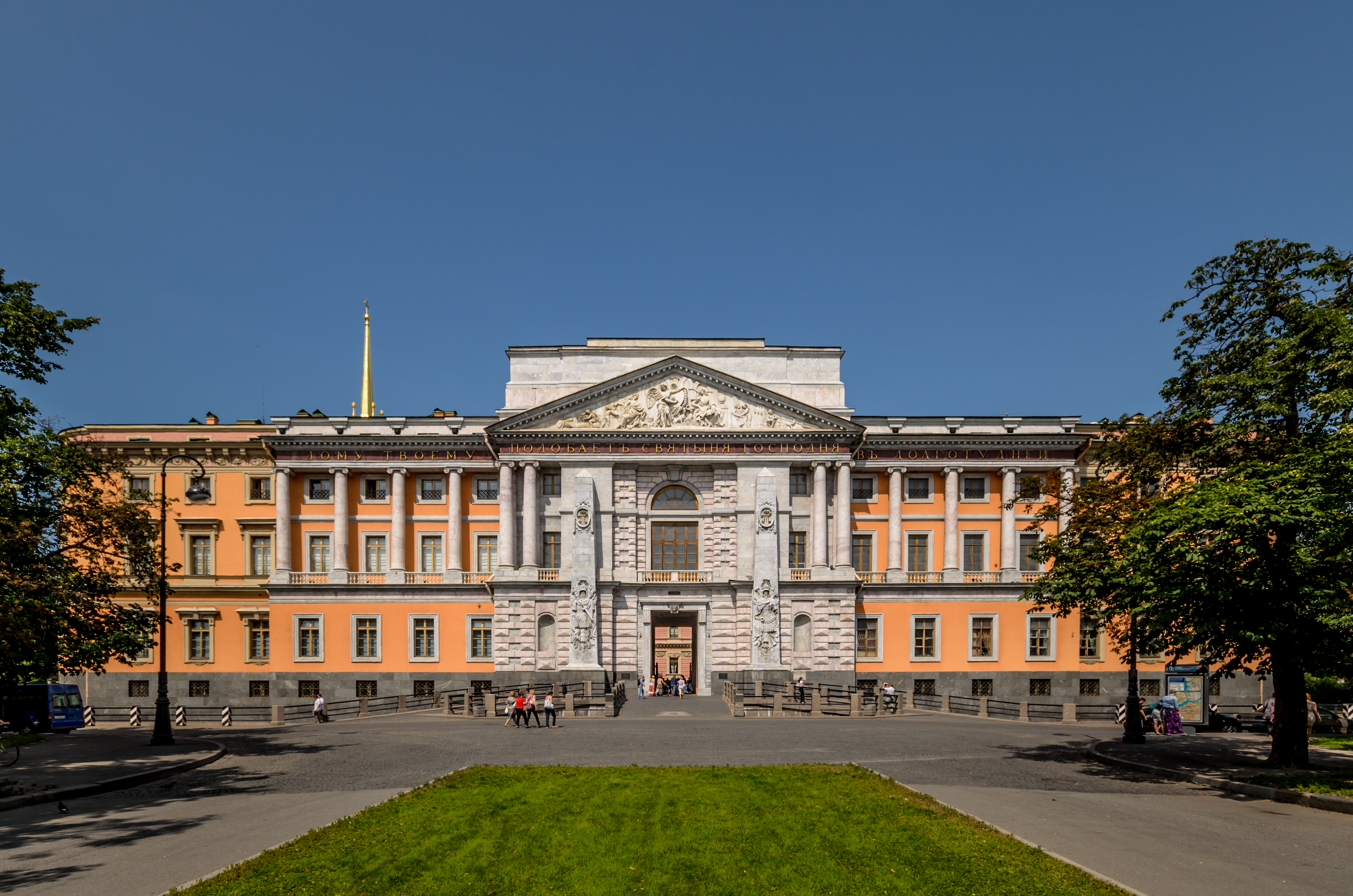
St Michael's Castle (Southern facade)

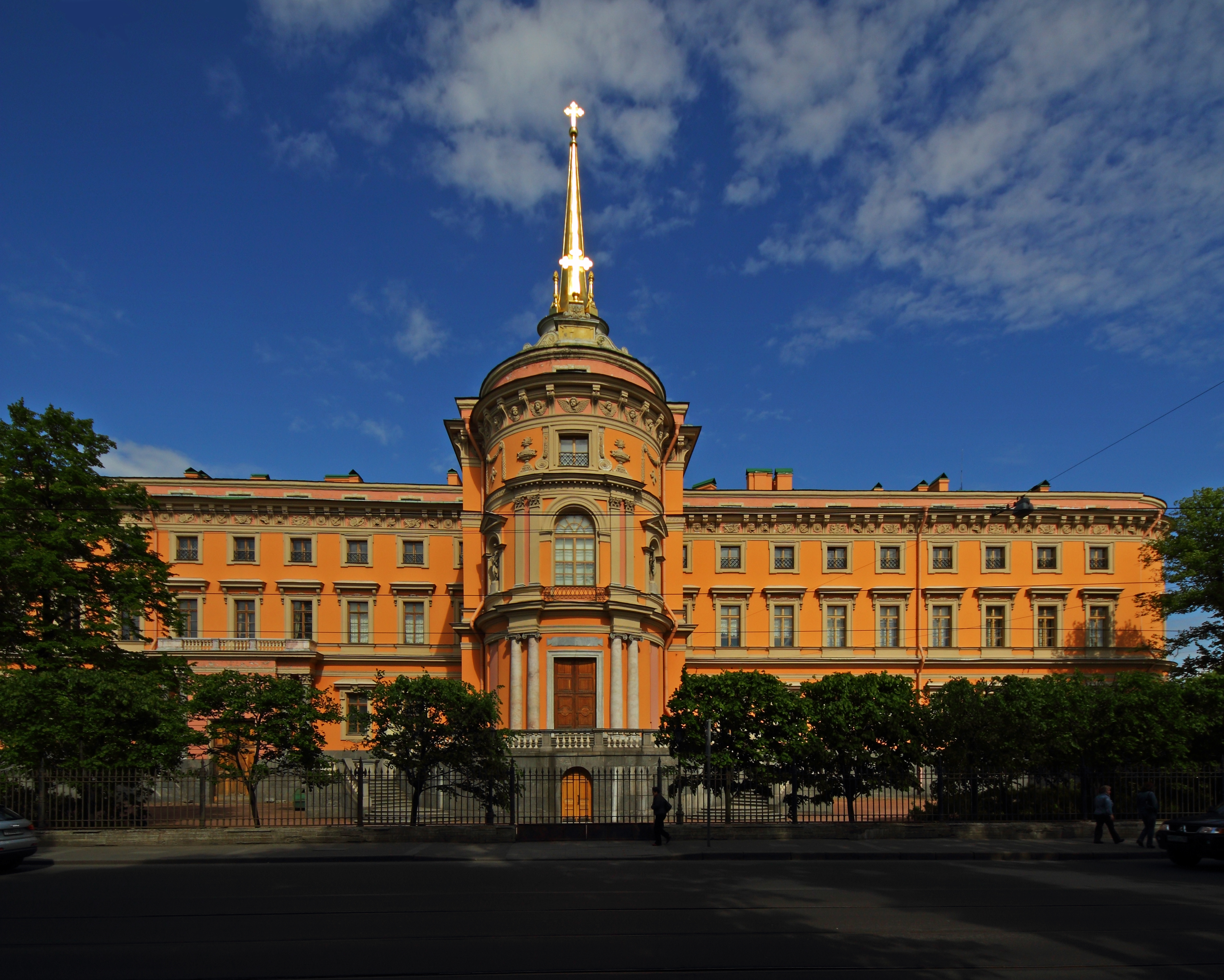
St Michael's Castle (Western facade)

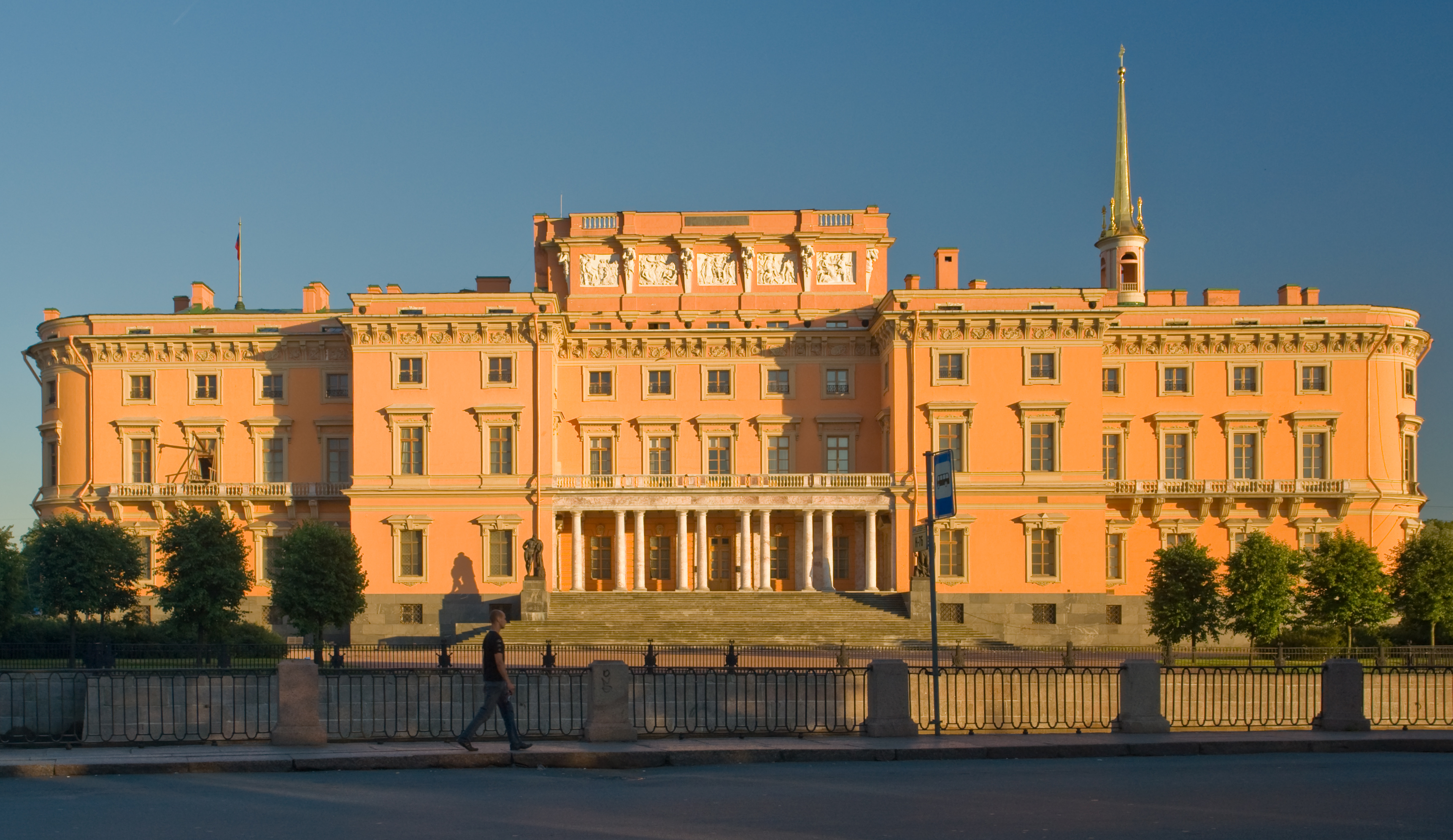
St Michael's Castle (Northern facade)

== See also ==
- Mikhailovsky Palace
