= And Quiet Flows the Don =

Epic novel by Russian writer Michail Sholokhov

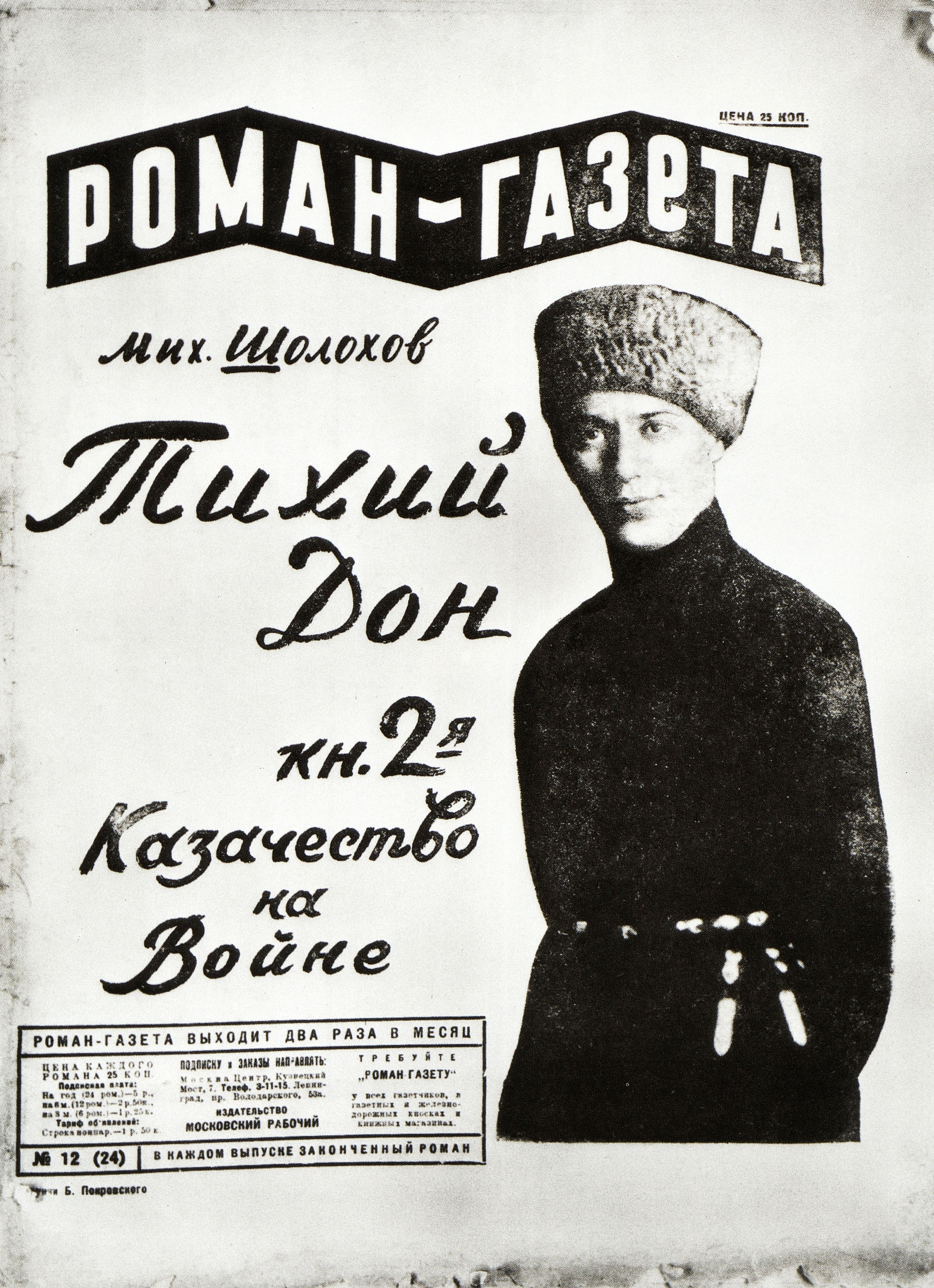
- Cover of Roman-gazeta (1928, No. 12)
- Author: Mikhail Sholokhov
- Original title: Тихий Дон
- Translator: Stephen Garry (1943/1950); Robert Daglish (1950/1984)
- Language: Russian
- Genre: Historical novel
- Publisher: Oktyabr (serial)
- Publication date: 1928–1932; 1940
- Publication place: Soviet Union
- Media type: Print
- OCLC: 51565813

And Quiet Flows the Don (Quiet Flows the Don or The Silent Don, Russian: Тихий Дон, romanized: Tikhiy Don, lit. 'The Quiet Don') is a novel in four volumes by Russian writer Mikhail Sholokhov. The first three volumes were written from 1925 to 1932 and published in the Soviet magazine Oktyabr in 1928–1932, and the fourth volume was finished in 1940.

The novel is considered one of the most significant works of literature in the 20th century. It depicts the lives and struggles of Don Cossacks during the First World War, the Russian Revolution, and Russian Civil War. In 1965, Sholokhov was awarded the Nobel Prize in Literature for the novel.

== Plot summary ==
The novel deals with the life of the Cossacks living in the Don River valley during the early 20th century, starting around 1912, just prior to World War I. The plot revolves around the Melekhov family of Tatarsk, who are descendants of a Cossack who, to the horror of many, took a Turkish captive as a wife during the Crimean War. She is accused of witchcraft by Melekhov's superstitious neighbors, who attempt to kill her but are fought off by her husband. Their descendants, the son and grandsons, who are the protagonists of the story, are therefore often nicknamed "Turks". Nevertheless, they command a high level of respect among people in Tatarsk.

The second eldest son, Grigory Panteleevich Melekhov, is a promising young soldier who falls in love with Aksinia, the wife of Stepan Astakhov, a family friend. Stepan regularly beats her and there is no love between them. Grigory and Aksinia's romance and elopement raise a feud between her husband and his family. The outcome of this romance is the focus of the plot as well as the impending World and Civil Wars which draw the best young Cossack men into what will be two of Russia's bloodiest wars. The action moves to the Austro-Hungarian front, where Grigory ends up saving Stepan's life, but that doesn't end the feud. Grigory, at his father's insistence, takes a wife, Natalya, but still loves Aksinia.

Grigory takes part in the Civil War, changing sides four times (Red to White to Red to White to indifferent). Many of his friends and relatives are killed in action or executed by both the Reds and Whites. Natalya dies after a failed amateur abortion, leaving Grigory with two small children who are eventually cared for by Aksinia. This does not prevent Grigory and Aksinia from trying a final escape alone together, but she is killed by a stray bullet during a fight with Red troops. Grief-stricken, Grigory buries her and returns home, with his prospects unclear.

The book deals not only with the struggles and suffering of the Cossacks but also the landscape itself, which is vividly brought to life. There are also many folk songs referenced throughout the novel.

And Quiet Flows the Don grew out of an earlier, unpublished work, the Donshina:

I began the novel by describing the event of the Kornilov putsch in 1917. Then it became clear that this putsch, and more importantly, the role of the Cossacks in these events, would not be understood without a Cossack prehistory, and so I began with the description of the life of the Don Cossacks just before the beginning of World War I. (quote from M.A. Sholokhov: Seminarii, (1962) by F.A. Abramovic and V.V. Gura, quoted in Mikhail Aleksandrovich Sholokhov, by L.L. Litus.)

Protagonist Grigory Melekhov is reportedly based on two Cossacks from Veshenskaya, Pavel Nazarovich Kudinov and Kharlampii Vasilyevich Yermakov, who were key figures in the anti-Bolshevist struggle of the upper Don.

== Literary significance, criticism, and accusations of plagiarism ==
The novel has been compared to Tolstoy's War and Peace (1869), notably by Maxim Gorky. Like the Tolstoy novel, And Quiet Flows the Don is an epic of Russian life during a tempestuous era of crisis, and examines it through political, military, romantic, and civilian lenses. Various rumours of plagiarism began circulating from 1930. Solzhenitsyn and others accused Sholokhov of plagiarizing a novel by Fyodor Kryukov, a more obscure author who fought against Bolshevism and died in 1920. An investigation in the late 1920s upheld Sholokhov's authorship of "Silent Don", and the allegations were denounced as malicious slander in Pravda. A later investigation using computational stylistic methods concluded that the text was similar to Sholokhov's other writing and quite dissimilar from Kryukov's.

During the Second World War, Sholokhov's archive was destroyed in a bomb raid, and only the fourth volume survived. Sholokhov had his friend Vassily Kudashov look after it. Following Kudashov's death in the war, his widow took possession of the manuscript, but she never disclosed her ownership. The manuscript was finally found by the Institute of World Literature of Russian Academy of Sciences in 1999 with assistance from the Russian Government. The writing paper dates back to the 1920s. 605 pages are in Sholokhov's own hand, evidencing considerable re-drafting and re-organising of the material by Sholokhov, and 285 pages are transcribed by his wife Maria and sisters.

== Awards and nominations ==
The novel won the Stalin Prize in 1941 and its author won the Nobel Prize in Literature in 1965.

== Adaptations ==
The novel has been adapted for the screen four times: a 1931 film by Ivan Pravov and Olga Preobrazhenskaya; a second, 1958 adaption was directed by Sergei Gerasimov and starred Elina Bystritskaya and Pyotr Glebov. In 1992–1993 a remake was directed by Sergei Bondarchuk (starring Rupert Everett); the film was not finished until 2006, when Fyodor Bondarchuk completed the editing, and was shown on Russian television as a seven-part miniseries. A shorter, 3-hour version of Bondarchuk's And Quiet Flows the Don was released on DVD in several countries. In 2015 the novel was adapted again more comprehensively as a 14-part TV-series, directed by Sergey Ursulyak.

Ivan Dzerzhinsky based his opera Quiet Flows the Don (Tikhiy Don) on the novel, with the libretto adapted by his brother Leonid. Premiered in October 1935, it became popular after Stalin saw and praised it a few months later. The opera was proclaimed a model of socialist realism in music and won Dzerzhinsky a Stalin Prize.

The lyrics for the folk song "Where Have All the Flowers Gone?" by Pete Seeger and Joe Hickerson were adapted from the cossack folk "Koloda duda" (Ukrainian: "колода дуда") song sung by Daria in And Quiet Flows the Don Part 1, Chapter 3 (page 17 Knopf edition).

== English translations ==
The English translation by Harry C. Stephens (who used the name Stephen Garry) of the first two volumes appeared under the title And Quiet Flows the Don in 1934, while the other two were published in 1940 as The Don Flows Home to the Sea. The whole work was published as a set of two books under the title The Silent Don. Garry's translation lacks about 25 percent of the novel text. In 1950 Garry's translation was "revised and completed" by Robert Daglish. In 1984 Daglish published his own translation of the novel as Quiet Flows the Don.

- And Quiet Flows the Don. Translated by Stephen Garry, 1934, Alfred A. Knopf.
- The Don Flows Home to the Sea. Translated by Stephen Garry, 1941, Alfred A. Knopf.
- The Silent Don. Translated by Stephen Garry, 1943, Alfred A. Knopf.
  - Volume 1. And Quiet Flows the Don.
  - Volume 2. The Don Flows Home to the Sea.
- And Quiet Flows the Don. Translated by Stephen Garry, revised and completed by Robert Daglish. Foreign Languages Publishing House, Moscow (in 4 volumes).
- Quiet Flows the Don. Translated by Robert Daglish. Raduga Publishers, 1984 (in 2 volumes).
  - Quiet Flows the Don. Translated by Robert Daglish, edited by Brian Murphy. Carroll & Graf, 1996.

== Sources ==
- Scammell, Michael (25 January 1998). "The Don Flows Again". The New York Times.
