= Sovetsky District, Russia =

Sovetsky District is the name of several administrative and municipal divisions in Russia. The name literally means "Soviet".

== Districts of the federal subjects ==
Federal subjects of Russia which have an entity called Sovetsky District

- Sovetsky District, Altai Krai, an administrative and municipal district of Altai Krai
- Sovetsky District, Republic of Crimea, an administrative and municipal district in the Republic of Crimea
- Sovetsky District, Khanty-Mansi Autonomous Okrug, an administrative and municipal district of Khanty-Mansi Autonomous Okrug
- Sovetsky District, Kirov Oblast, an administrative and municipal district of Kirov Oblast
- Sovetsky District, Kursk Oblast, an administrative and municipal district of Kursk Oblast
- Sovetsky District, Mari El Republic, an administrative and municipal district of the Mari El Republic
- Sovetsky District, Rostov Oblast, an administrative and municipal district of Rostov Oblast
- Sovetsky District, Saratov Oblast, an administrative and municipal district of Saratov Oblast
- Sovetsky District, Stavropol Krai, an administrative and municipal district of Stavropol Krai

== City divisions ==
1. Sovetsky City District, Astrakhan, a city district of Astrakhan, the administrative center of Astrakhan Oblast
2. Sovetsky City District, Bryansk, a city district of Bryansk, the administrative center of Bryansk Oblast
3. Sovetsky City District, Chelyabinsk, an administrative and municipal city district of Chelyabinsk, the administrative center of Chelyabinsk Oblast
4. Sovetsky City District, Ivanovo, a city district of Ivanovo, the administrative center of Ivanovo Oblast
5. Sovetsky City District, Kazan, a city district of Kazan, the capital of the Republic of Tatarstan
6. Sovetsky City District, Krasnoyarsk, a city district of Krasnoyarsk, the administrative center of Krasnoyarsk Krai
7. Sovetsky Territorial Okrug, a territorial okrug of the city of Lipetsk, the administrative center of Lipetsk Oblast
8. Sovetsky City District, Makhachkala, an administrative and municipal city district of Makhachkala, the capital of the Republic of Dagestan
9. Sovetsky City District, Nizhny Novgorod, a city district of Nizhny Novgorod, the administrative center of Nizhny Novgorod Oblast
10. Sovetsky City District, Novosibirsk, a city district of Novosibirsk, the administrative center of Novosibirsk Oblast
11. Sovetsky Administrative Okrug, an administrative okrug of the city of Omsk, the administrative center of Omsk Oblast
12. Sovetsky City District, Orsk, a city district of Orsk, a city in Orenburg Oblast
13. Sovetsky City District, Oryol, a city district of Oryol, the administrative center of Oryol Oblast
14. Sovetsky City District, Rostov-on-Don, a city district of Rostov-on-Don, the administrative center of Rostov Oblast
15. Sovetsky City District, Ryazan, a city district of Ryazan, the administrative center of Ryazan Oblast
16. Sovetsky City District, Samara, an administrative and municipal city district of Samara, the administrative center of Samara Oblast
17. Sovetsky City District, Tambov, a city district of Tambov, the administrative center of Tambov Oblast
18. Sovetsky City District, Tomsk, a city district of Tomsk, the administrative center of Tomsk Oblast
19. Sovetsky City District, Tula, a city district of Tula, the administrative center of Tula Oblast
20. Sovetsky City District, Ufa, a city district of Ufa, the capital of the Republic of Bashkortostan
21. Sovetsky City District, Ulan-Ude, a city district of Ulan-Ude, the capital of the Buryat Republic
22. Sovetsky City District, Vladivostok, a city district of Vladivostok, the administrative center of Primorsky Krai
23. Sovetsky City District, Volgograd, a city district of Volgograd, the administrative center of Volgograd Oblast
24. Sovetsky City District, Voronezh, a city district of Voronezh, the administrative center of Voronezh Oblast
Cities in Russia with a city division called "Sovetsky"

== Renamed districts ==
- Sovetsky District, name of Shamilsky District of the Republic of Dagestan, until 1994
- Sovetsky District, name of Chereksky District of the Kabardino-Balkar Republic, until 1994

== See also ==
- Sovetsky (disambiguation)
- Sovetsky Okrug (disambiguation)
- Sovetsk
