= Soviet Union (disambiguation) =

The Soviet Union (abbr. SU; Russian: Сове́тский Сою́з, romanized: Sovetsky Soyuz, lit. 'Council Union'; abbr. СС) or Union of Soviet Socialists Republics (USSR; Russian: СССР) was a 20th-century country based about Russia.

Soviet Union or Sovetsky Soyuz (Russian: Сове́тский Сою́з) may also refer to:

- Sovetsky Soyuz (Russian: «Сове́тский Сою́з», lit. ''Soviet Union''), the Soviet magazine Soviet Union
- Sovetsky Soyuz-class battleship (Russian: Сове́тский Сою́з, lit. 'Soviet Union'), the Soviet battleship class Soviet Union
  - Soviet battleship Sovetsky Soyuz (Russian: Советский Союз, lit. 'Soviet Union'), the battleship Soviet Union, lead ship of the eponymous class; see Sovetsky Soyuz-class battleship
- SS Sovetskiy Soyuz (Russian: Советский Союз, lit. 'Soviet Union'), the SS Soviet Union, the name of passenger-cargo ship SS Albert Ballin from 1949 to 1980
- A national sports team of the Soviet Union

== See also ==
- Soviet of the Union (Russian: Сове́т Сою́за, romanized: Sovet Soyuza), the lower parliamentary chamber of the Soviet Union
- "Koviet Union", a literal translation of Kouvostoliitto, a humorous nickname of Finnish city Kouvola
- Soviet (disambiguation)
- Union (disambiguation)
- CCCP (disambiguation)
- USSR (disambiguation)
- Russia (disambiguation)
- Sovetsky (disambiguation)
- Soyuz (disambiguation)
