= CCPS =

CCPS is an abbreviation that may refer to:

- One of several school districts in the United States:
  - District School Board of Collier County, a school district in Southwest Florida
  - Charlotte County Public Schools, a school district in Southwest Florida
  - Chesterfield County Public Schools, a school division in Virginia
  - Camden City Public Schools, a school district in New Jersey
  - Cobb County Public Schools, a school district in Georgia
  - Carroll County Public Schools (Maryland), a school district in Maryland
  - Cecil County Public Schools, a school district in Maryland
  - Charles County Public Schools, a school district in Maryland
  - Clayton County Public Schools, a school district in Georgia
  - Culpeper County Public Schools
- Center for Chemical Process Safety, an initiative of the American Institute of Chemical Engineers
- Center for Congressional and Presidential Studies, a teaching and study program
- China Central Party School, a political training school in Beijing, China
- Consumer Council for Postal Services, the official monitoring body for the British Royal Mail
- Catalytically competent protonation state, the catalytically active protonation state of an enzyme

== See also ==
- CCP (disambiguation)
