= SSSR =

SSSR may refer to:

- Smallest Set of Smallest Rings, a cheminformatics term for the minimal cycle basis of a molecular graph
- Society for the Scientific Study of Reading, a learned society promoting the study of reading and literacy
- Society for the Scientific Study of Religion, a learned society for a social scientific perspective on religious institutions and experiences
- SSS-R, a model of the Nissan Bluebird compact car

== See also ==
- CCCP (disambiguation)
- USSR (disambiguation)
