= Sovetsky District =

Sovetsky District or Sovetsky City District may refer to:

- Sovetsky District, Russia, several districts and city districts in Russia
- Savyetski District (Sovetsky District), a city district of Minsk, Belarus
- Sovietskyi Raion (Sovetsky District), a district of Crimea
- Sovetsky City District, Novosibirsk

== See also ==
- Sovetsky (disambiguation)
