= Comoé Chimpanzee Conservation Project =

Research and conservation project

The Comoé Chimpanzee Conservation Project, CCCP, is a research and conservation project created in October 2014 by Juan Lapuente with the support of K. Eduard Linsenmair, from Würzburg University. Its main objectives are to study and help to preserve the population of chimpanzees resident in Comoé National Park and its neighboring areas, in Ivory Coast.

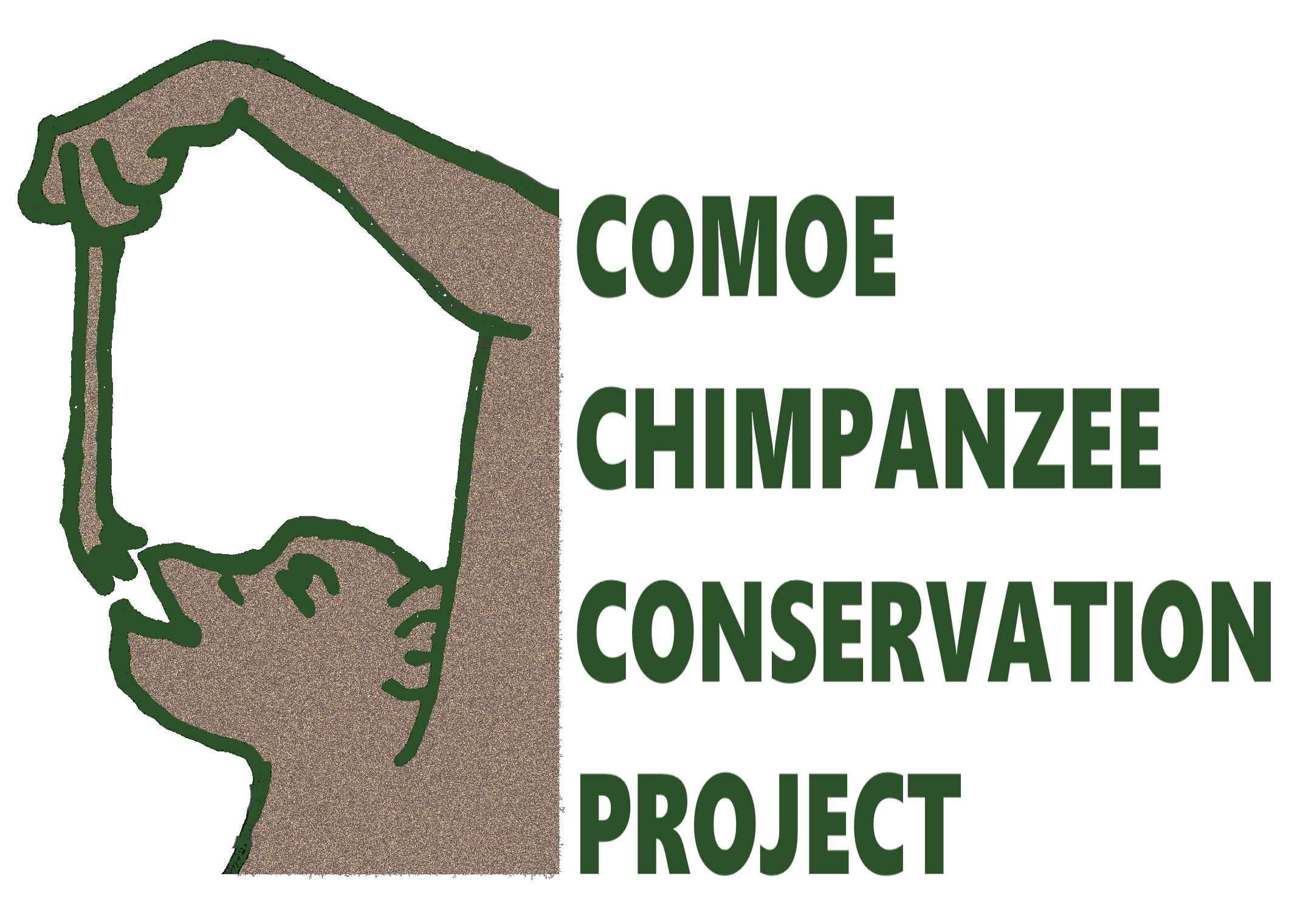
Logotype of the project

The project initially developed with the support of the Comoé Research Station. CCCP has worked in collaboration with Max Planck Institute for evolutionary anthropology and received funding from Fundació Barcelona Zoo, Arcus Foundation and Fish and Wildlife Service. The project keeps a close collaboration with the managers of the park, OIPR, to implement measures that help to the conservation of the chimpanzees and other key species, such as elephants and great predators.

== Conservation outcome ==
The work of the project in collaboration with OIPR has helped to secure the area where the chimpanzees live and it helped to return the park to the UNESCO list of World Heritage

== Scientific outcome ==
During the first four years of the project, CCCP gained deep knowledge of the Western chimpanzees (Pan troglodytes verus) living in savanna-woodland mosaic in Ivory Coast, discovering several new behaviors that are still under study. Comoé chimpanzees realize a behavior exclusive from this area, water dipping with specialized tools and also realize a variant of the recently described accumulative stone throwing. The project is studying and documenting through camera-trap videos and ethnoarchaeological methods many aspects of the ecology, behavior and tool use of these chimpanzees.

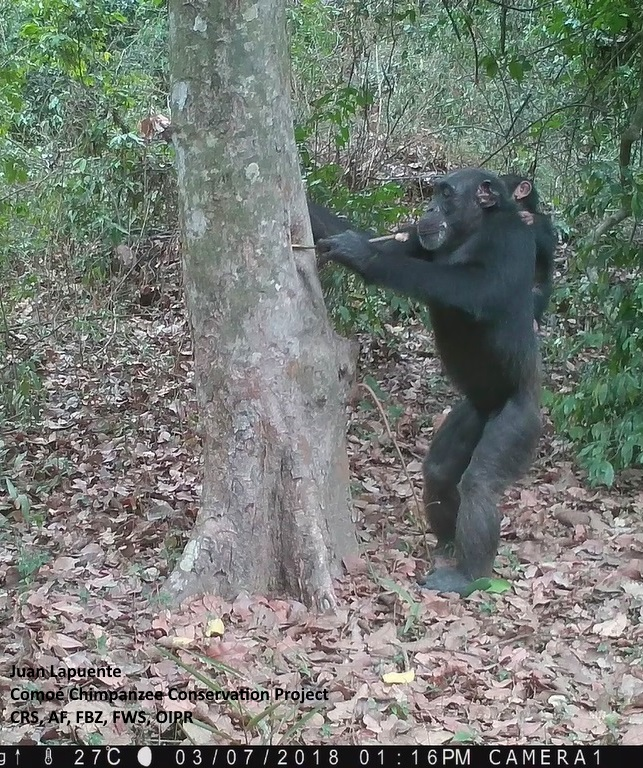
Ktimene, from Odissey community, introduces a stick tool in a treehole.

== Social outcome ==
The project trains and incorporates local villagers of the area as research assistants, realizes awareness raising campaigns and contributes to the local economy. By 16 July 2019, the date of edition of this article, 28 students and researchers of 11 different countries have participated in the project, including six African students.
