= Dieter Froese =

Video installation artist (1937–2006)

- Froese in 2003
- Born: Hans-Dietrich Froese; October 1, 1937; Tilsit, East Prussia
- Died: 2006; New York City, U.S.
- Known for: video installation, sculpture, photography, film
- Notable work: Imprecise Details — Not a Model for Big Brother's Spy Cycle
- Spouses: Hildegarde Lutze; Kay Hines (m. 1979–2006)

Dieter Froese (born Hans-Dietrich Froese) (1937–2006) was a pioneering video installation artist who also worked in film, sculpture, and photography.

== Early life ==
Froese was born on October 9, 1937, outside the town of Tilsit, in the former state of East Prussia, (now Sovetsk in western Russia). His father was a cheesemaker. During the final months of World War II, he and his mother fled to the forest from war-torn Berlin as it fell to the Red Army and they eventually took shelter with family near Nuremberg.

== Career ==
In 1964, Froese received a Ford Foundation grant that enabled him to move to the United States, where he filed for and received permanent residence status in 1969. He was part of the first wave of artists to move into raw industrial loft spaces in lower Manhattan in the 1970s, for use as live/work spaces.

He began exhibiting his work in the early 1970s, and was included in the inaugural exhibition at P.S.1 Contemporary Art Center. He is known for his installation, Imprecise Details: Not a Model for Big Brother's Spy Cycle, that premiered in 1988, at the Stadtisches Kunstmuseum in Bonn, Germany. Later it was shown in New York at the International Center of Photography in 1990. The content of the work addresses the history of video surveillance from the Cold War through the first years of the 21st century. The large scale installation deploys real and dummy surveillance cameras and monitors that track viewers' movement through various rooms in the museum. Inspired by George Orwell's notion of dystopia, the work sheds light on how personal freedoms are compromised by the panoptical presence of surveillance and its associated cultural control. In the exhibition catalog for the Surveillance show at Los Angeles Contemporary Exhibitions, video curator, John Hanhardt wrote that Froese's "projects are fashioned out of the expectations and frustrations that challenge and inhibit our daily lives."

Froese exhibited his multi-media art works at the Museum of Modern Art, the Whitney Museum, the New Museum of Contemporary Art, White Columns, Hallwalls, LACE, Kunstmuseum Bonn, and many other international venues.

Froese's work has been written about in the following books, Digital Currents: Art in the Electronic Age; The Literariness of Media Art; and Pop Goes the Decade: The Eighties.

He was also a video producer, having founded Dekart Video in Manhattan, with his wife Kay Hines. They created videos for leading museums such as the Smithsonian, as well as music videos for the rock 'n' roll band R.E.M. among others.

== Collections ==
Froese's work is included in the permanent collections of ZKM Center for Art and Media, Karlsruhle; LUX, London; the Museo Nacional Centro de Arte Reina Sofía; Neue Berliner Kunstverein (n.b.k.), the Museum of New Zealand Te Papa Tongarewa, among others.

== Death ==
Froese died in New York from cancer in 2006.
