= Sovetsky =

Sovetsky (masculine), Sovetskaya (feminine), Sovetskoye (neuter), or Sovetskiye (plural) is something named after the Soviet Union.

== Places ==
- Sovetsky District (disambiguation), several districts in the countries of the former Soviet Union
- Sovetsky Okrug (disambiguation), various divisions in Russia
- Sovetsky Urban Settlement (or Sovetskoye Urban Settlement), several municipal urban settlements in Russia
- Sovetsky, Russia (Sovetskaya, Sovetskoye), several inhabited localities in Russia
- Sovetsky, Baku (Sovetskaya), historical inhabited locality in Baku's Yasamal district
- Sovietskyi (Sovetsky), an urban-type settlement in Crimea
- Sovietske (Sovetskoye), an urban-type settlement in Crimea
- Sovetskiy, Kyrgyzstan, an urban-type settlement in Kyrgyzstan
- Sovetsky Airport, an airport in Khanty-Mansi Autonomous Okrug, Russia
- Sovietsky Hotel, a hotel located in Moscow
- Sovetskaya (Antarctic Research Station), the Soviet Antarctic research station
  - Sovetskaya (lake), a lake in the Antarctic, under the station
- Sovetskaya Mountain, a mountain on Wrangel Island
- Sovetskoye, Altai Krai, a rural locality (a selo) and the administrative center of Sovetsky District of Altai Krai
- Sovetskoye, Jalal-Abad, a village in Jalal-Abad Region, Kyrgyzstan
- Sovetskoye, Kemin, a village in Kemin District, Kyrgyzstan
- Savieckaja Square, the Soviet name for the central square of Hrodna, Belarus
- Vorkuta Sovetsky, an airbase and settlement in the Komi Republic, Russia.

== Other ==
- Sovetskaya metro station, a metro station of the Samara Metro, Samara, Russia
- Sovetskoye Shampanskoye, a generic brand of sparkling wine

== See also ==
- Soviet (disambiguation)
- Soviet Union (disambiguation) including Sovetsky Soyuz
- Sovetsk
