= Sovetsky Urban Settlement =

Sovetsky Urban Settlement or Sovetskoye Urban Settlement is the name of several municipal formations in Russia.

- Sovetsky Urban Settlement, a municipal formation which the town of Sovetsky in Sovetsky District of Khanty-Mansi Autonomous Okrug is incorporated as
- Sovetsky Urban Settlement, a municipal formation which the Urban-Type Settlement of Sovetsky in Sovetsky District of the Mari El Republic is incorporated as
- Sovetskoye Urban Settlement, a municipal formation which the Town of Sovetsk in Sovetsky District of Kirov Oblast is incorporated as
- Sovetskoye Urban Settlement, a municipal formation corresponding to Sovetskoye Settlement Municipal Formation, an administrative division of Vyborgsky District of Leningrad Oblast
- Sovetskoye Urban Settlement, a municipal formation the work settlement of Sovetskoye in Sovetsky District of Saratov Oblast is incorporated as

== See also ==
- Sovetsky (disambiguation)
- Sovetsk Urban Settlement, a municipal formation which Sovetsk Town Under District Jurisdiction in Shchyokinsky District of Tula Oblast is incorporated as
