= Soyuz-1 =

Soyuz-1 may refer to:

- Soyuz 1, the first manned flight of the Soyuz programme
- Soyuz TM-31, the first Soyuz mission to the International Space Station
- Soyuz-1 (rocket), a proposed Russian carrier rocket
- Soyuz (spacecraft) 's first generation class

== See also ==
- Soyuz-L
- Soyuz T-1
- Soyuz TM-1
- Soyuz TMA-1
- Soyuz TMA-01M
- Soyuz MS-01
- Soyuz (disambiguation)
