= Comoé National Park Research Station =

Ivorian research station

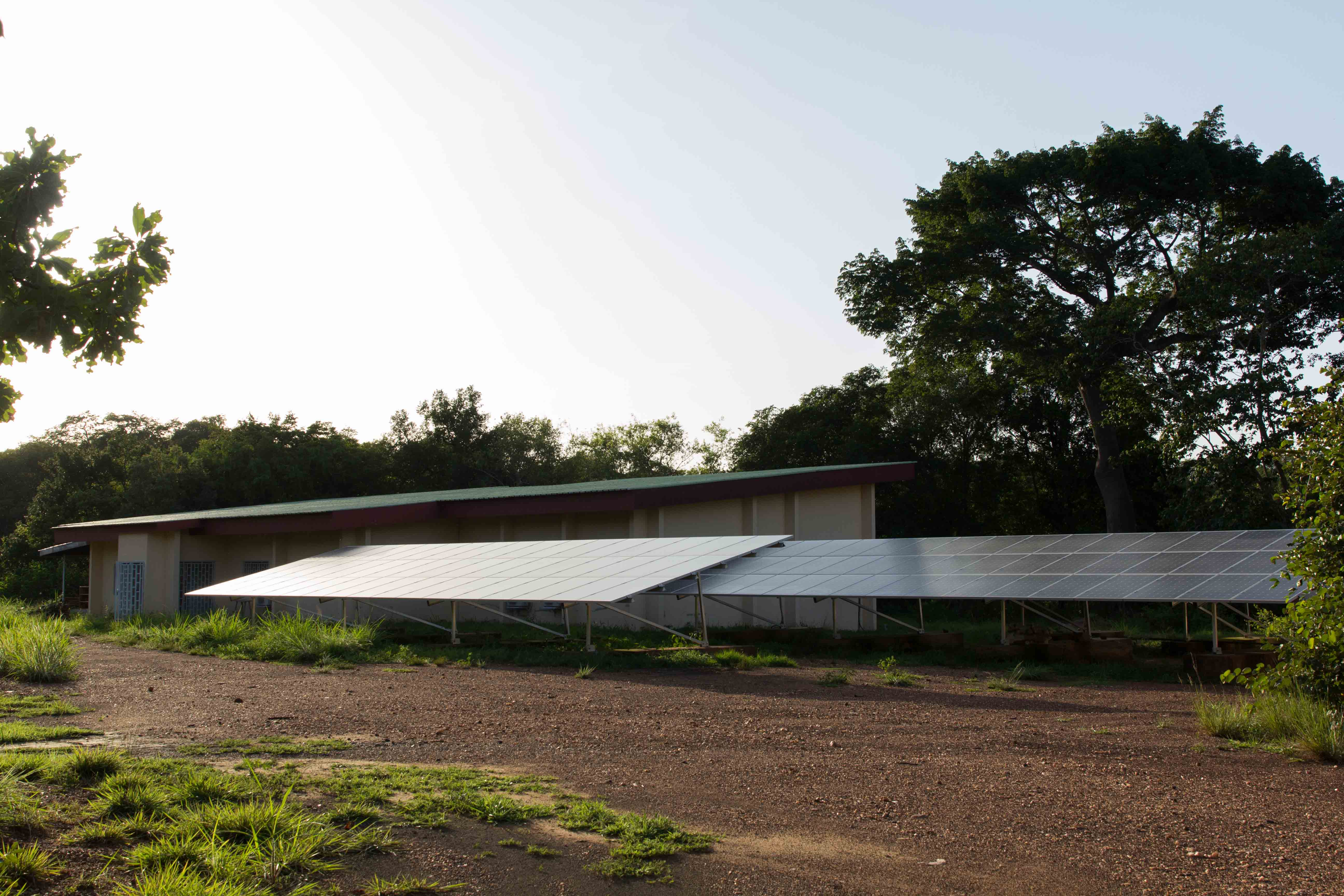
- Laboratory with solar panels

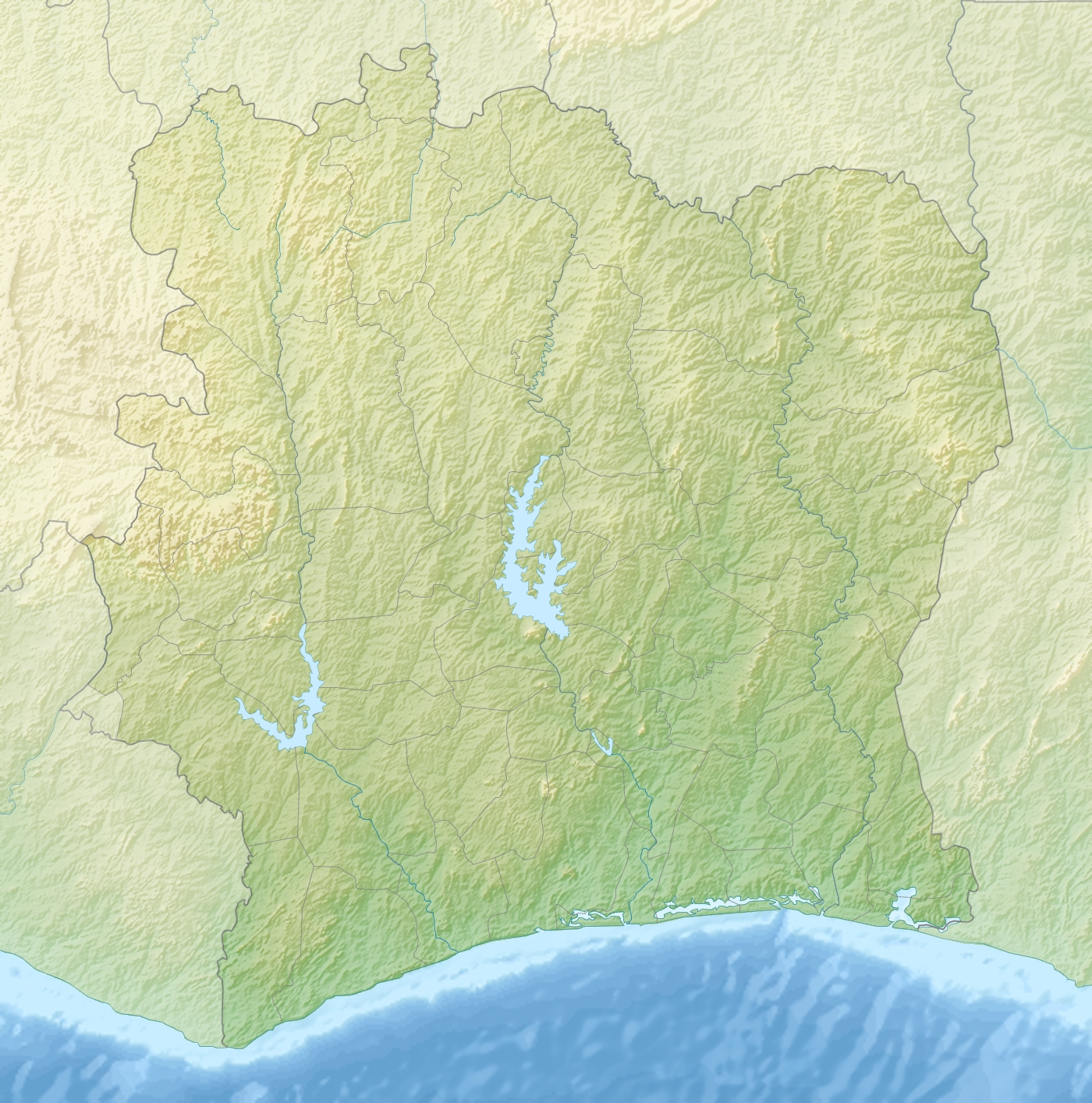
- Location within Ivory Coast
- Location: Côte d'Ivoire
- Nearest city: Bouna
- Coordinates: 8°46′11″N 3°47′21″W
- Established: 1989/90

The Comoé National Park Research Station, located in the Comoé National Park, Côte d'Ivoire, was founded by Professor Karl Eduard Linsenmair, a German biologist, in 1989/90.

The research station was forced to close after the outbreak of the First Ivorian Civil War in 2002. After the end of the Second Ivorian Civil War in 2011 repairs at the station began and in 2014 the station had achieved again its full working capacity. The focus of the field based research is on conservation, tropical ecology and behaviour.

== History ==
In 1989/90 a first research camp was realized with substantial funding provided by the Volkswagen Stiftung, the University of Würzburg and the respective Ministry (Bayerisches Staatsministerium für Bildung und Kultus, Wissenschaft und Kunst). A successful application for a research grant by Linsenmair at the Fritz Thyssen Foundation led to the expansion and transformation into a permanent station, after various bureaucratic hurdles in Germany and Côte d'Ivoire, which delayed the construction of the field station approximately 8 years. Construction started in 2000 and in early 2002 all guesthouses and other buildings apart from the lab were finished and a move from the camp to the new station was possible.

The outbreak of the First Ivorian Civil War, in September 2002, resulted in the loss of the entire removable and demountable equipment and the closure of the station. Due to the positive development in the country after the Second Ivorian Civil War, the rehabilitation of the station started in 2012 with remaining funds from the Fritz Thyssen Foundation and the University of Würzburg. With the construction of the solar plant, in December 2014, the rehabilitation was finished and the station had achieved its full working capacity again, making it one of the most modern field research stations in Africa.

== Research ==
The Research of the station focuses on various fields of conservation, tropical ecology and behaviour, e.g. ecophysiology, chemical and evolutionary ecology. In its first 2 decades before the civil war over 20 international research institutions conducted projects at the station with over 100 scientists contributing to the over 200 papers published in peer-reviewed journals. Far more students participated in field courses, collecting data for more than 40 diploma, masters, bachelors and Ph.D. theses.

=== Research Cooperations ===
Research institutions currently working at the station are:

- University of Würzburg, Germany
- University of Freiburg, Germany
- University of Rostock, Germany
- Museum für Naturkunde, Berlin, Germany
- Université d'Abobo-Adjamé, Abidjan, Côte d'Ivoire
- University of Groningen, Netherlands

The research station is also a base for the longterm and large scale monitoring program in the BMBF's WASCAL project (West African Science Service Center on Climate Change and Adapted Land Use) and was one of the headquarters for the BIOTA West project focused in Côte d'Ivoire until the outbreak of the civil war. It also works closely together with the park management (OIPR, Office Ivorien des Parcs et Reserves) on matters of conservation.

== Facilities ==
The facilities of the research station allow for completely autonomous working conditions 24 hours a day and include:

- A 750 sqm large climatised laboratory
- A refectory, consisting of a kitchen and a large dining area
- A 36kWP Solar power station and a 30kWP backup Generator
- A watertower pumping water from groundwater level (80 m deep)
- 14 houses able to hold 15 researchers for long-term research and up to 30 for short trips/excursions
- A garage offering space for up to four land cruisers, motorbikes, bicycles and rudimentary repairs
Facilities of the Comoé National Park Research Station
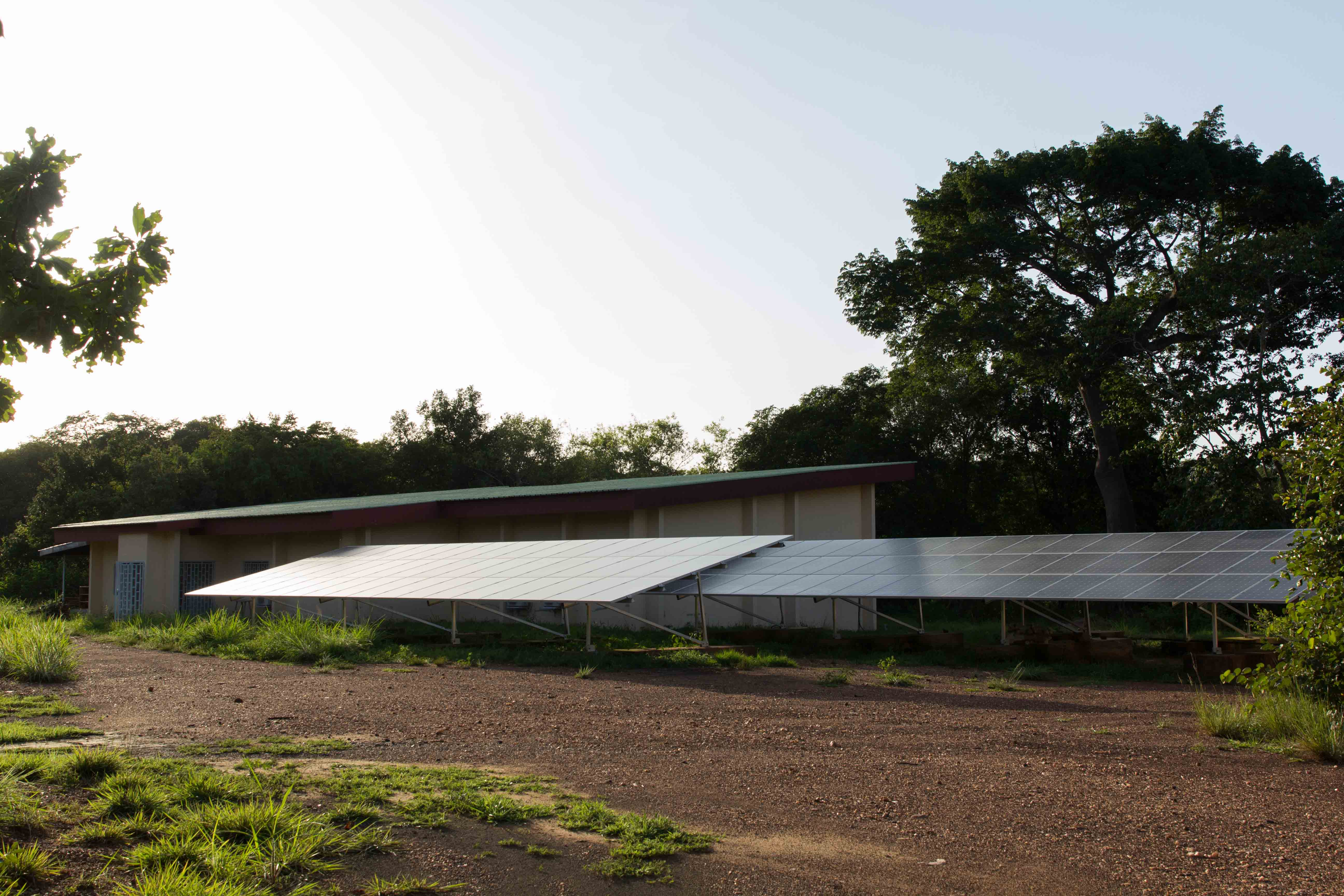
Laboratory with solar panels

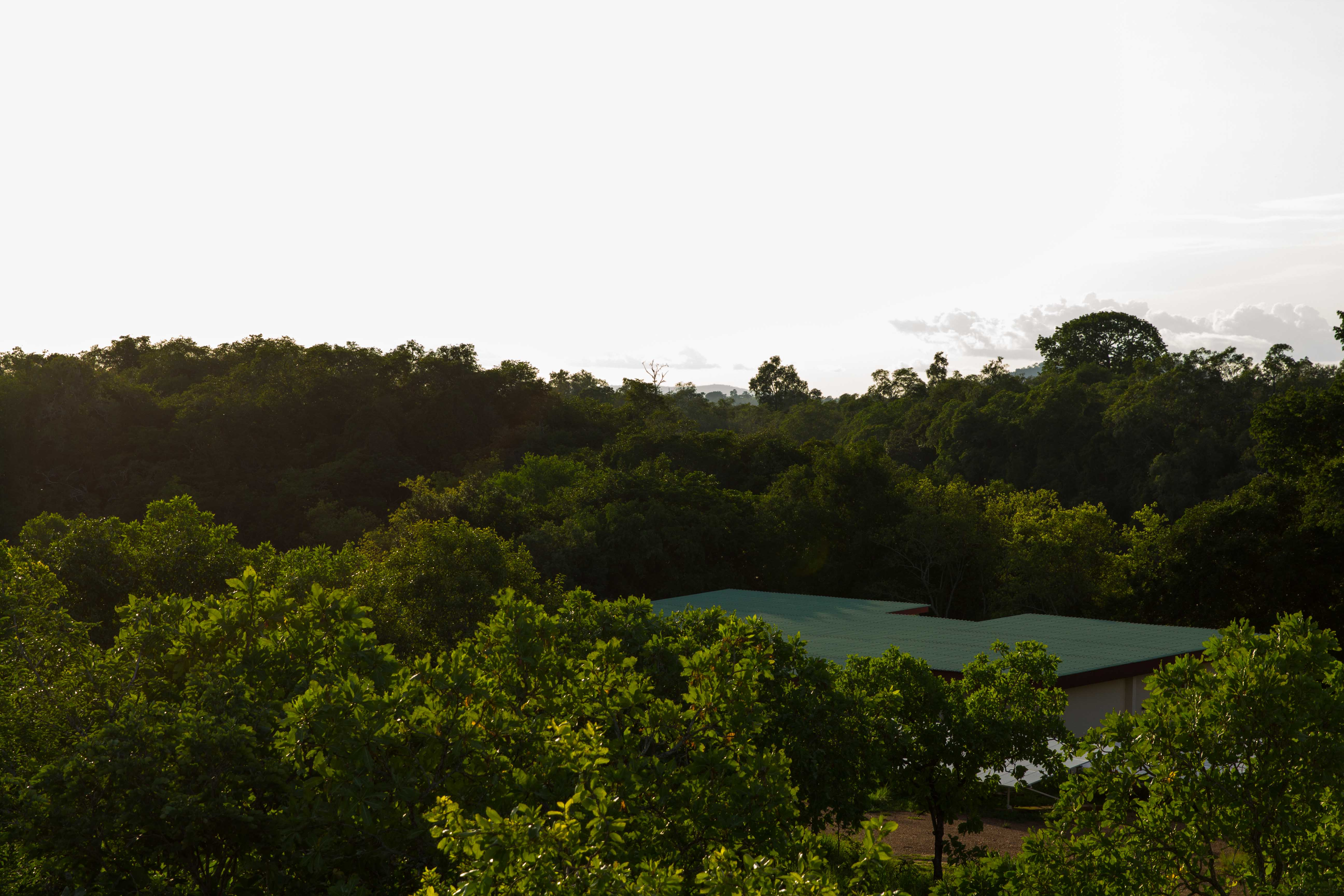
View from the watertower

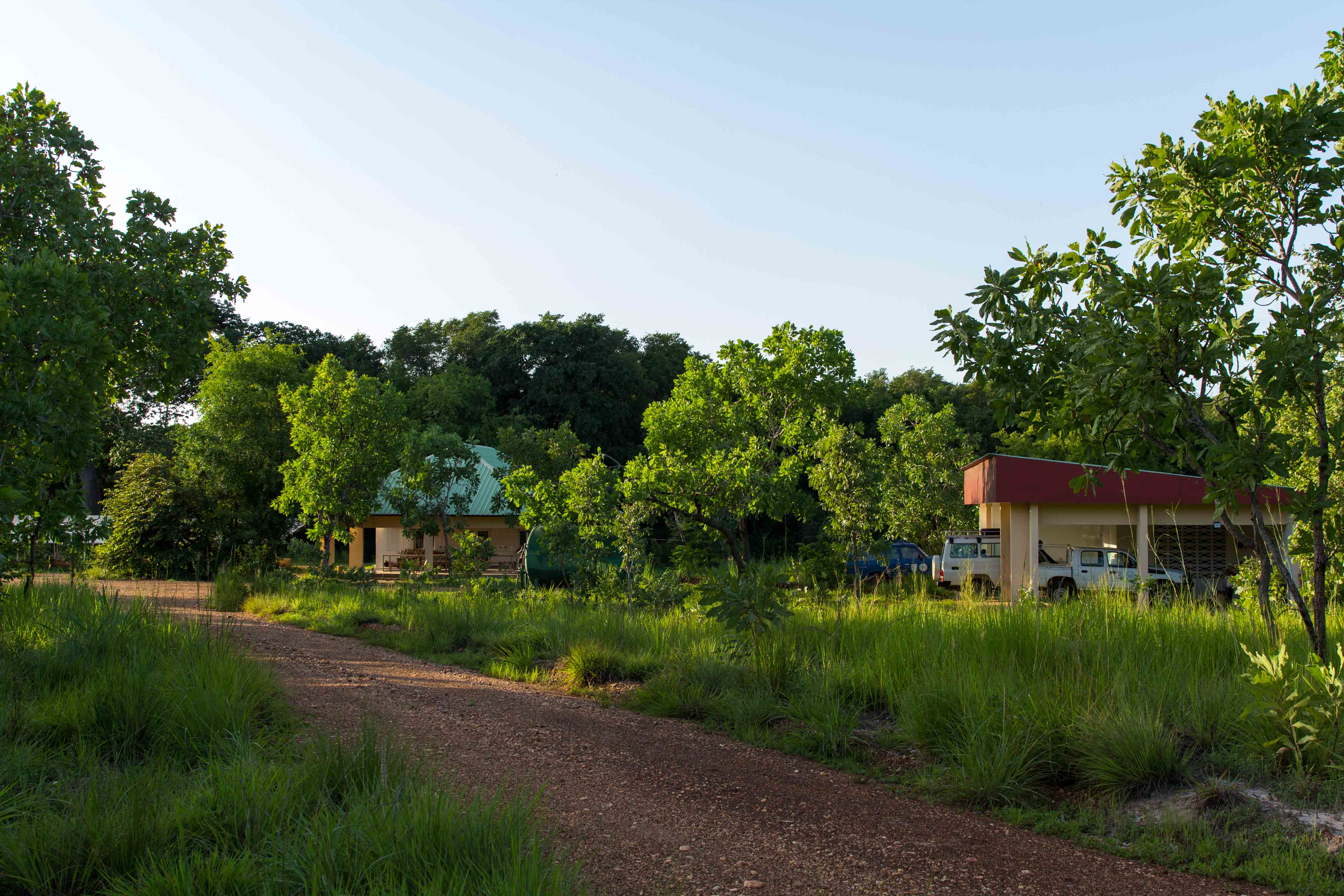
View of the Refectory (left) and the Garage (right) from the entrance

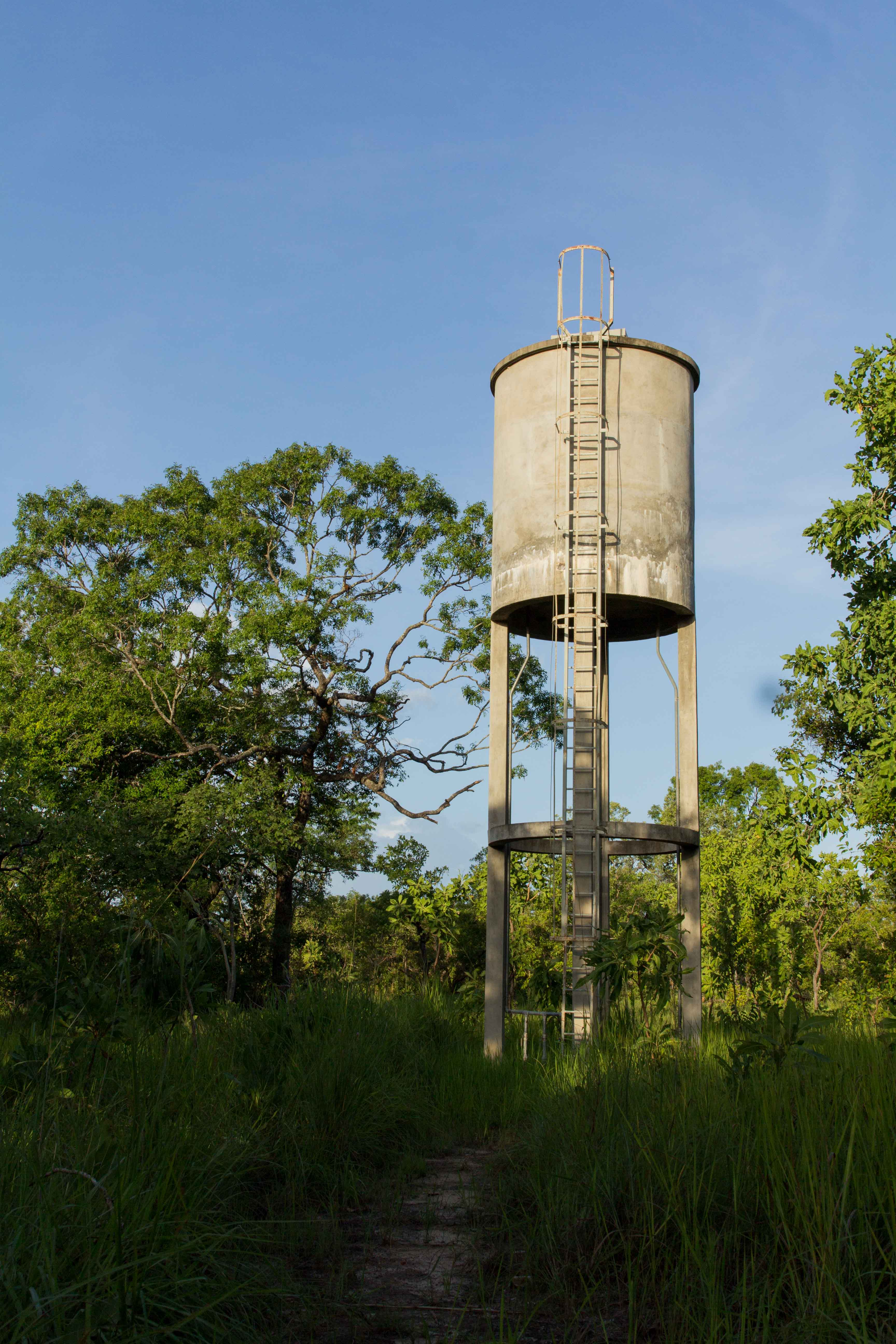
Watertower with 80m deep waterpump

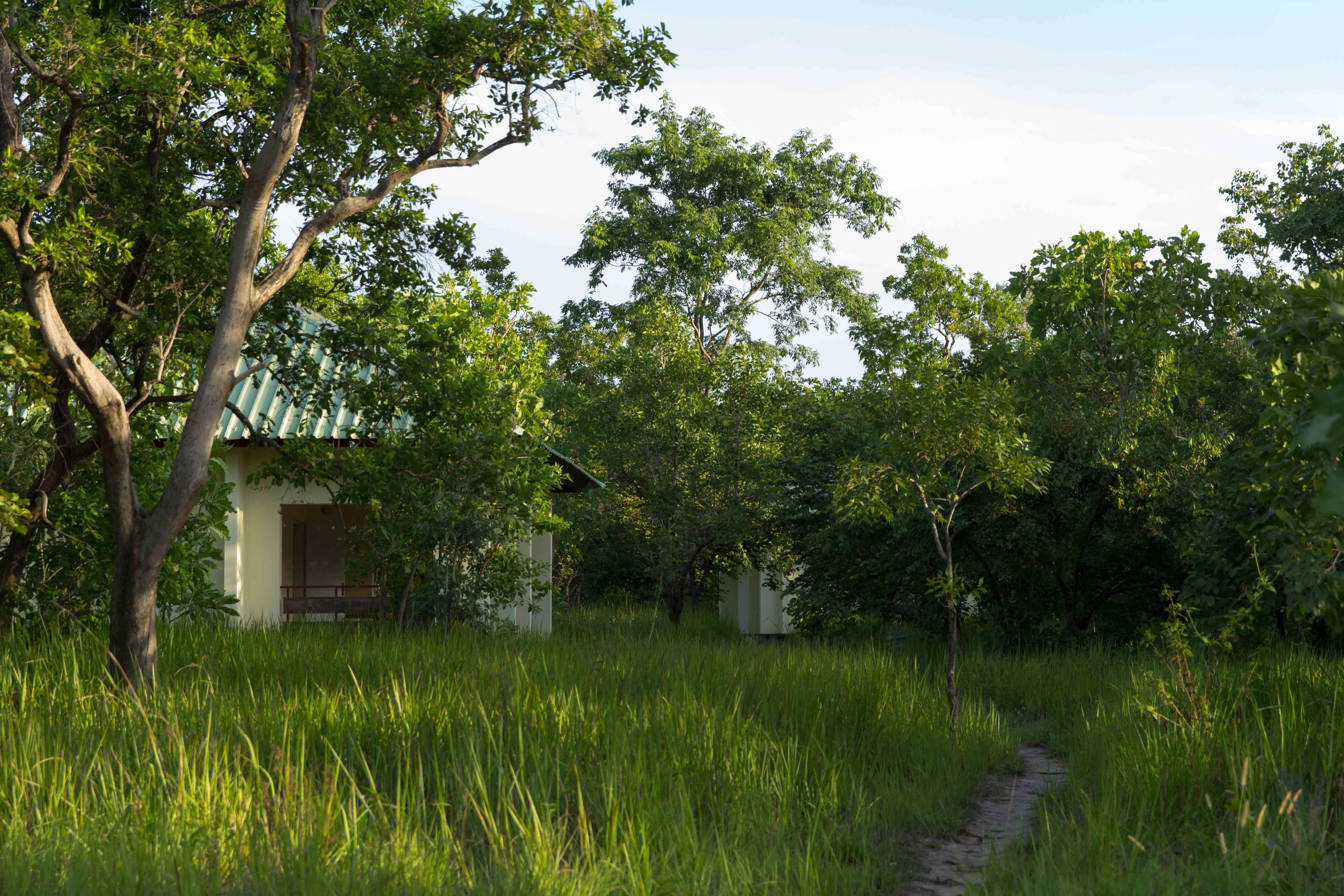
One of the 14 separate houses of the Researchstation

== Further Information ==
- Homepage of the Comoé National Park Research Station
