= Sovetsk =

Sovetsk (Russian: Сове́тск) is the name of several urban localities in Russia.

- Sovetsk, Kaliningrad Oblast, a town in Kaliningrad Oblast, formerly Tilsit
- Sovetsk, Kirov Oblast, a town in Sovetsky District of Kirov Oblast; 57°35′N 48°59′E
- Sovetsk, Tula Oblast, a town in Shchyokinsky District of Tula Oblast

== See also ==
- Sovetsky (disambiguation)
- Soviet (disambiguation)
