= USSR (disambiguation) =

USSR most often refers to the Soviet Union.

USSR may also refer to:

- Union of Soviet Sovereign Republics, a proposed replacement state for the Union of Soviet Socialist Republics
- The USSR, a former Soviet magazine distributed in the United States; its modern successor is Russian Life
- "U.S.S.R." (song), a song by Eddy Huntington, recorded in 1986
- "U.S.S.R.", a bonus track from a reissue of Siamese Dream by Smashing Pumpkins

== See also ==
- CCCP (disambiguation)
- SSSR (disambiguation)
- Soviet Union (disambiguation), including Sovetsky Soyuz
- Ukrainian Soviet Socialist Republic, normally abbreviated as UkrSSR
- Uzbek Soviet Socialist Republic, normally abbreviated as UzSSR
