= C.C.C.P. (band) =

German synth-pop/EBM act

- Origin: Germany
- Genres: Synth-pop, EBM
- Years active: 1986–present
- Labels: Clockwork Germany

C.C.C.P. is a German synth-pop act led by Rasputin Stoy. They were best known for the 1986 songs "American-Soviets I" and "American-Soviets II", released by Clockwork Germany. This six-minute song themed on the Cold War became a hit on the US Billboard charts, the German Top 75 and other European charts. Their follow-up singles ("Made in Russia" and "Orient Express") hit the number one and number two spots on official music charts in the same week (Hong Kong, Benelux, France and Spain). Their 1990 song "Don't Kill the Rainforest" was also a minor alternative radio hit. Their band name C.C.C.P. is a Romanization of the Cyrillic abbreviation "СССР", which actually translates to "SSSR", short for Союз Советских Социалистических Республик (Soyuz Sovetskikh Sotsialisticheskikh Respublik), the Russian name for the USSR.

C.C.C.P. released their seventh album, Quantic Shamanism Through Digital Western featuring Meyhiel, in January 2008 on the art label MillePlateauxMedia.

The group now only consists of the original band leader Rasputin Stoy a.k.a. Rai Streubel, and Frank Schendler (ex-Beat-A-Max).

In 2018, they released the album Decadance Club on the label Saal 600. In 2020, they had planned to be back on stage with a new lineup.

== Discography ==
=== Albums ===
- 1989: The World
- 1992: The Hallucinogenic Toreador
- 2004: Journey Through the Past
- 2008: Quantic Shamanism Through Digital Western
- 2018: Decadance Club (Blue!)

=== Live albums ===
- 1992: Live Houston 1990
- 2013: C.C.C.P. Live Houston 2013

=== Compilations ===
- 1992: Best of C.C.C.P.: 1985–1992
- 1997: C.C.C.P. & Beat-A-Max: Best of C.C.C.P. & Beat-A-Max
- 2013: Official the World Remixes 2014

=== Singles ===
- 1986: "American-Soviets"
- 1987: "Made in Russia"
- 1988: "Orient Express"
- 1989: "United States of Europe"
- 1990: "Don't Kill the Rain Forest"
- 1990: "Liquid Sky"
- 1991: "Freedom & Liberty"
- 1991: "In Memory of Salvador Dali"
- 1991: "Conquestadores"/"Strength versus Courage"
- 1991: "Orient Express '91"
- 1996: "The Preacher"
- 1999: "3rd Millennium"
- 2018: "Decadance Club"
- 2018: "Mirror of Your Soul"
- 2018: "Twelve" (Tibor's Mix)
