= Karl Eduard Linsenmair =

German biologist

Karl Eduard Linsenmair (born 8 February 1940) is a German biologist and university professor emeritus. His areas of work are general ecology, ethoecology, ecophysiology, sociobiology and orientation physiology; his focus is tropical ecology.

== Life ==
Linsenmair was born in Munich. He studied zoology, botany, chemistry, anthropology and psychology in Heidelberg, Freiburg and Frankfurt. He received his dissertation in 1966 German: Konstruktion und Signalfunktion der Sandpyramide der Reiterkrabbe Ocypode saratan Forsk. (Decapoda Brachyura Ocypodidae)(Construction and signaling function of the sand pyramid of the rider crab Ocypode saratan Forsk). (Decapoda Brachyura Ocypodidae)) received his doctorate. At the Goethe University Frankfurt in Frankfurt am Main he was a DFG research fellow from 1967 to 1970 and a research assistant in the biology department at the University of Regensburg in 1970/1971 . He completed his habilitation in 1971 and taught at the University of Regensburg from 1972 to 1976. In 1976 he took over the chair of animal ecology at the Zoological Institute of the University of Würzburg.

Linsenmair has made a decisive contribution to the establishment and promotion of the research areas of tropical ecology and biodiversity. He initiated and coordinated the German Research Foundation (DFG) priority program “Mechanisms for the Conservation of Tropical Diversity” and the European Science Foundation program "Tropical Canopy Research", which has since been expanded to a global level. As the only biologist in the National Committee for Global Change Research, he was significantly involved in the development of the concept for the BMBF program BIOLOG-BIOTA. In this context, he led the BIOTA-West program, which aimed to use findings from basic ecological research to find concrete solutions to problems on the African continent. He and his chair were responsible for the scientific and administrative coordination of 16 universities and scientific institutes in Germany, Burkina Faso, Benin and Ivory Coast.

== Research in Africa ==
In the 1980s, Linsenmair developed plans to build a permanent ecological research station in the savannah of the Ivory Coast. On a research trip there in 1973, he was fascinated by the incredible diversity of the different frogs. The Comoé National Park has been a World Heritage Site since 1983. In 1989 the first huts were built from bushes and leaves, eaten by termites within a year and rebuilt. As early as 1991, Linsenmair received funding from the Thyssen Foundation for his ecological research station. Due to bureaucratic hurdles imposed by offices, authorities and ministries, collecting all the signatures from the 20 bodies took nine years; construction work on the research station did not begin until 1999.

In 2002, Linsenmair's research group moved to the massive camp, which was well equipped for zoological, botanical and ecological research. This was unique in West Africa. Linsenmair made important contributions to biodiversity research in West Africa. In addition to the occurrence and behavior of individual animal species, he examined global change, the spread of deserts and the loss of biodiversity. In September 2002, an international delegation visited the research station. Just a few weeks later, the First Ivorian Civil War began in Ivory Coast, which raged directly at Linsenmair's station. He and his European colleagues were flown out and were only able to return ten years later. During this time, Linsenmair led the Biota West Africa project from Benin and Burkina Faso. The project conducted biodiversity research and built an international network.

In 2010, after almost two years of planning and construction, the new information center on biodiversity was opened by Karl Eduard Linsenmair and Robert Foro in Ouagadougou, the capital of Burkina Faso, in which the collected knowledge will now be made available to the general public. The civil war officially ended in 2007, but it was only in 2011 that the government became somewhat stable and was able to contain the unrest that was flaring up. In 2012, Linsenmair returned to the savannah after the civil war and found the research station in ruins. He and his colleagues rebuilt everything. Today there are 14 guest houses with air conditioning and running water at a distance around the main building. The centerpiece is a long research building with a library, offices and laboratories. The station has had an internet connection since 2014 and research operations have started again. Several students and doctoral candidates are researching various projects here and have already published their first scientific publications.

== Memberships and honors ==
Karl Eduard Linsenmair became president of the Gesellschaft für Tropenökologie (Society for Tropical Ecology) (gtö) in 1990, and has been an elected member of the German National Academy of Sciences Leopoldina since 1997 and of the Academia Europaea since 1998. He is also president of the Society for Tropical Ecology (gtö). He is chairman of the scientific advisory board and member of the board of trustees of the ZMT (Leibniz Centre for Tropical Marine Research) in Bremen as well as a member of the scientific advisory board and the board of trustees of the German arm of World Wide Fund for Nature. He is also a member of various advisory boards and committees (“Global Change Research”, Senckenberg Research Institute, Natural History Museum, Berlin, DFG Zoology Review Board for the subject “Ecology and Ecosystem Research”).

In 1996 Linsenmair received the Körber Prize for European Science. In 2014, Linsenmair was awarded the Gold Medal of Merit from the University of Würzburg for his contributions to research.

== Publications ==
- Linsenmair, K. Eduard (1967-01-12). "Konstruktion und Signalfunktion der Sandpyramide der Reiterkrabbe Ocypode saratan Forsk. (Decapoda Brachyura Ocypodidae)" [Construction and signaling function of the sand pyramid of the rider crab Ocypode saratan Forsk. (Decapoda Brachyura Ocypodidae)]. Zeitschrift für Tierpsychologie (in German). 24 (4): 403–456. doi:10.1111/j.1439-0310.1967.tb01238.x. ISSN 0044-3573.
- Fondation européenne de la science, ed. (2001). Tropical forest canopies: ecology and management proceedings of ESF conference, Oxford University, 12–16 December. Forestry sciences. Dordrecht: Kluwer academic publ. ISBN 978-0-7923-7049-9. "Proceedings of the European Science Foundation Conference on Tropical Forest Canopies. Reprinted from Plant Ecology, volume 153, Nos. 1-2, pp. 1-130."
- Barthlott, Wilhelm; Linsenmair, Karl-Eduard; Porembski, Stefan, eds. (2009). Biodiversity structure and function; Vol. 1. Encyclopedia of life support systems : EOLSS 9, Environmental and ecological sciences, engineering, and technology resources. Oxford, U.K: Eolss Publishers. ISBN 978-1-84826-934-7.
- Linsenmair, Karl-Eduard (1968). Wie die Alten sungen ... Warum singen Vögel?. Kosmos-Bibliothek, Bd. 258 (in German). Stuttgart: Kosmos. p. 87. OCLC 5282734.
