= CCP (disambiguation) =

The CCP, or Chinese Communist Party, is the sole ruling party in the People's Republic of China.

CCP may also refer to:

== Organizations ==
- Center for Competitive Politics, former name of the Institute for Free Speech, a US conservative non-profit
- Centre for Contemporary Photography, a photography gallery in Melbourne, Australia
- Ceylon College of Physicians, a medical association in Sri Lanka
- Confederación Campesina del Perú, a farmers' movement in Peru
- Cultural Center of the Philippines, promoting and preserving Filipino art and culture
- CCP Games, an Icelandic video game developer
- Compact Carry Pistol Division, a shooting division of the International Defensive Pistol Association

=== Education ===
- Center for Creative Photography, a research facility and archival repository at the University of Arizona, Tucson, US
- Central Colleges of the Philippines, an educational institution in Quezon City, Philippines
- Centre for Child Protection, of the Gregorian University for understanding and preventing sexual abuse in the Catholic Church
- Circle City Prep, a public K-8 charter school in Indianapolis, Indiana, US
- Community College of Philadelphia, a community college in Philadelphia, Pennsylvania, US
- University of Chicago Contemporary Chamber Players, an American ensemble dedicated to the performance of contemporary classical music

=== Government and law ===
- Canadians' Choice Party, a far-right party in Ontario, Canada
- Coimbatore City Police, India
- Competition Commission of Pakistan, an independent agency of the Government of Pakistan
- Concealed Carry Permit, required in parts of the US
- Court Challenges Program of Canada, assisting Canadians in accessing the justice system

== Economy or finance ==
- Central counterparty clearing, a method by which a financial institution facilitates transactions in security markets
- Common commercial policy, a process by which countries co-ordinate or completely delegate their trade policy

== Professional certification ==
- Certification in Clinical Perfusion, a professional designation that certifies the competency of cardiovascular perfusionists
- Certified Cheese Professional, a professional certification awarded by the American Cheese Society
- Certified College Planning Specialist, a designation issued by the National Institute of Certified College Planners
- Certified Computing Professional, a professional certification administered by the Institute for Certification of Computing Professionals
- Certified Cost Professional, a professional certification awarded by AACE International
- CESG Certified Professional, for certifying information assurance professionals in UK government and industry

== Science and technology ==
- Capacitively coupled plasma, a style of industrial plasma source commonly used in microfabrication
- Cell cycle progression, the series of events that takes place in a cell
- Complement control protein, proteins that interact with components of the complement system
- Context change potential, analysis of natural language, establishing meaning on the dynamic basis of prior shared information
- Cubic close-packed, a type of crystal structure
- Cyclic citrullinated peptide, a chemical whose presence in the blood is an indicator of rheumatoid arthritis
- Cytochrome c peroxidase, an enzyme found in yeast that catalyzes the decomposition of hydrogen peroxide
- Commercial Crew Program, a human spaceflight program operated by NASA

=== Computing ===
- CAN Calibration Protocol, for communication with embedded systems with CAN-bus
- Common-closure principle, one of the package principles of object-oriented design
- Compression Control Protocol, a subprotocol of the Point-to-Point Protocol
- Console Command Processor, a component of the CP/M operating system
- Context change potential, in natural language processing, the evaluation of new input against most recent output

== Other uses ==
- Chinese Confession Program, a 1956–1965 program run by the US Immigration and Naturalization Services
- Carbonless copy paper, a type of paper allowing multiple copies of one writing
- Carriel Sur International Airport (IATA airport code), Chile
- Chakma language (ISO 639-3: ccp), an Indo-European language spoken by the Chakma and Daingnet people
- Club Cerro Porteño, a football team in Paraguay
- Conference on Cataloguing Principles, international conference on library cataloging in Paris in 1961
- Country Club Plaza, a regional shopping center in Kansas City, US
- Critical control point, a food safety procedure
- Cross County Parkway, a road in Westchester County, New York, US

== See also ==
- CCCP (disambiguation)
