= Soyuz, Perm Krai =

Soyuz Союз
- Village
- Location within Perm Krai Location within Russia
- Coordinates: 56°21′N 55°28′E
- Country: Russia
- Region: Perm Krai
- District: Kuyedinsky District
- Time zone: UTC+5:00

Soyuz (Russian: Союз) is a rural locality (a village) in Bolshegondryskoye Rural Settlement, Kuyedinsky District, Perm Krai, Russia. The population was 80 as of 2010. There is 1 street.

== Geography ==
Soyuz is located 18 km southwest of Kuyeda (the district's administrative centre) by road. Artaulovo is the nearest rural locality.
