= Soyuz =

Soyuz may refer to:

== Space program ==
- Soyuz programme, a human spaceflight program initiated by the Soviet Union, continued by the Russian Federation
- Soyuz (spacecraft), used in that program
- Soyuz (rocket), initially used to launch that spacecraft
- Soyuz (rocket family), derivatives of that rocket design
- Soyuz Launch Complex in Kourou, French Guiana

== Other uses ==
- SS Albert Ballin, a 1922 German-built ship recovered and renamed Soyuz by the USSR
- Soyuz (faction) in the Congress of Soviets, 1990–1991
- Soyuz, Perm Krai, village in Russia
- Soyuz pipeline, Soviet, now Russian export gas pipeline
- Soyuz (political party), a political party in Ukraine, established in 1997
- Soyuz Station, a base established in 1982 by members of the Soviet Antarctic Expeditions in Mac. Robertson Land
- Studio Soyuz, a Moscow-based media company, founded in 1988

== In fiction ==
- Soyuz, a team of Russian superheroes in DC Comics
- Soyuz, a character in Dr. Stone, a Japanese manga series
