= Catalytically competent protonation state =

The catalytically competent protonation state is the catalytically active protonation state of an enzyme. An enzyme is a protein, which catalyzes a chemical reaction. Proteins and enzymes consist of amino acids, some of which are titratable (i.e., they can alter their charge when the pH of the solution changes), and an enzyme commonly needs a set of specific residues in its active site to occupy a specific protonation state to be catalytically active.

An example of this phenomenon is provided by hen egg white lysozyme - a lysozyme that has two acidic residues in its active site that are important for catalytic activity: Glu35 and Asp 52. For hen egg white lysozyme to be catalytically active, Glu35 must be neutral (i.e., be protonated), whereas Asp 52 must be negatively charged (i.e., it has lost its proton). The protonation state Glu35H,Asp52– is thus the catalytically competent protonation state of hen egg white lysozyme, where H denotes the protonated form of the Glu.

== pH-activity profiles ==
Since an enzyme is active only when it is in the catalytically competent protonation state (i.e., it occupies a specific protonation state), it follows that the fraction of enzyme molecules in the catalytically competent protonation state determines how active a population of enzyme molecules are. The fractional population of the catalytically competent protonation state is thus a significant quantity, and the pH-dependence of the fractional population of the catalytically competent protonation state determines the pH-activity profile of the enzyme.

The population of a catalytically competent protonation state can be predicted using protein pKa calculations.
