= CCCP (disambiguation) =

СССР (Russian: Союз Советских Социалистических Республик), is an abbreviation in Cyrillic characters of the Union of Soviet Socialist Republics (Soviet Union).

CCCP may also refer to:

- C.C.C.P. (band), a German group
- CCCP - Fedeli alla linea, an Italian band formed in 1982
- Canadian Centre for Child Protection
- Cat Colony Care Programme, in Asia, of the Society for the Prevention of Cruelty to Animals
- Carbonyl cyanide m-chlorophenyl hydrazone, a toxic ionophore and decoupler of the respiratory chain
- Combined Community Codec Pack, a software pack for Microsoft Windows to play multimedia content
- Climate Change and Carbon Plan, a strategic plan adopted by the Oregon Board of Forestry, US
- Comoé Chimpanzee Conservation Project, a nature reserve in Ivory Coast

== See also ==
- CCP (disambiguation)
- California Code of Civil Procedure (CCP)
