= Sovetskoye, Jalal-Abad Region =

Sovetskoye Совет
- Location within Kyrgyzstan
- Coordinates: 41°3′36″N 72°43′48″E
- Country: Kyrgyzstan
- Region: Jalal-Abad
- District: Bazar-Korgon
- Elevation: 756 m (2,480 ft)

Population (2021)
  - Total: 13,178
- Time zone: UTC+6

Sovetskoye or Sovet (Kyrgyz: Совет) is a village in Jalal-Abad Region of Kyrgyzstan. Its population was 13,178 in 2021. Formerly a village within the rural community (ayyl aymagy) of Kengesh, it was merged into the new city of Bazar-Korgon in January 2021.

== Population ==
Historical population
| Year | Pop. | ±% p.a. |
|---|---|---|
| 2009 | 9,035 | — |
| 2021 | 13,178 | +3.20% |
Note: resident population; Sources:
