= Sovetsk, Tula Oblast =

Town in Tula Oblast, Russia

Sovetsk Советск
- Town
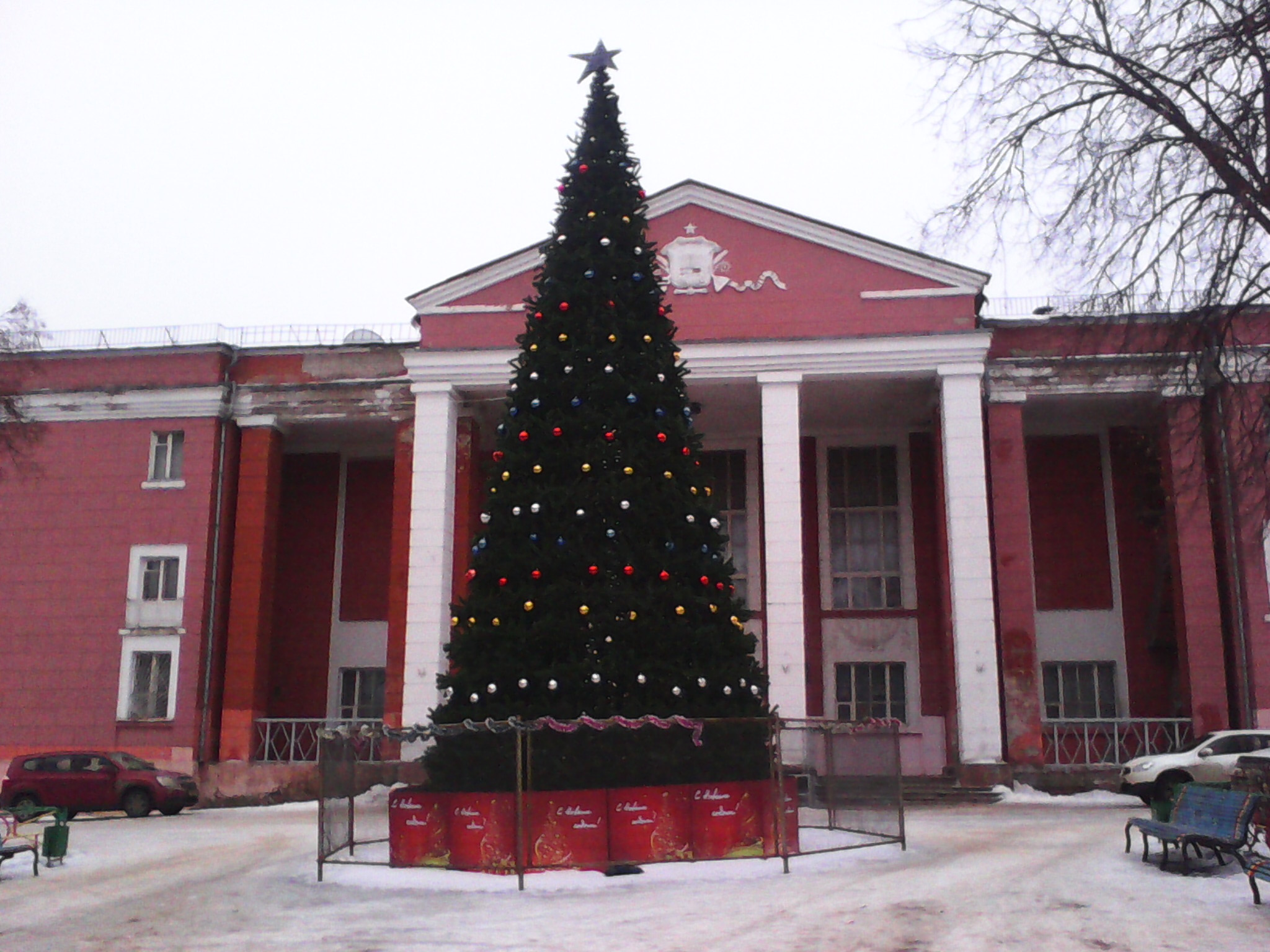
- House of culture in the town during Christmas

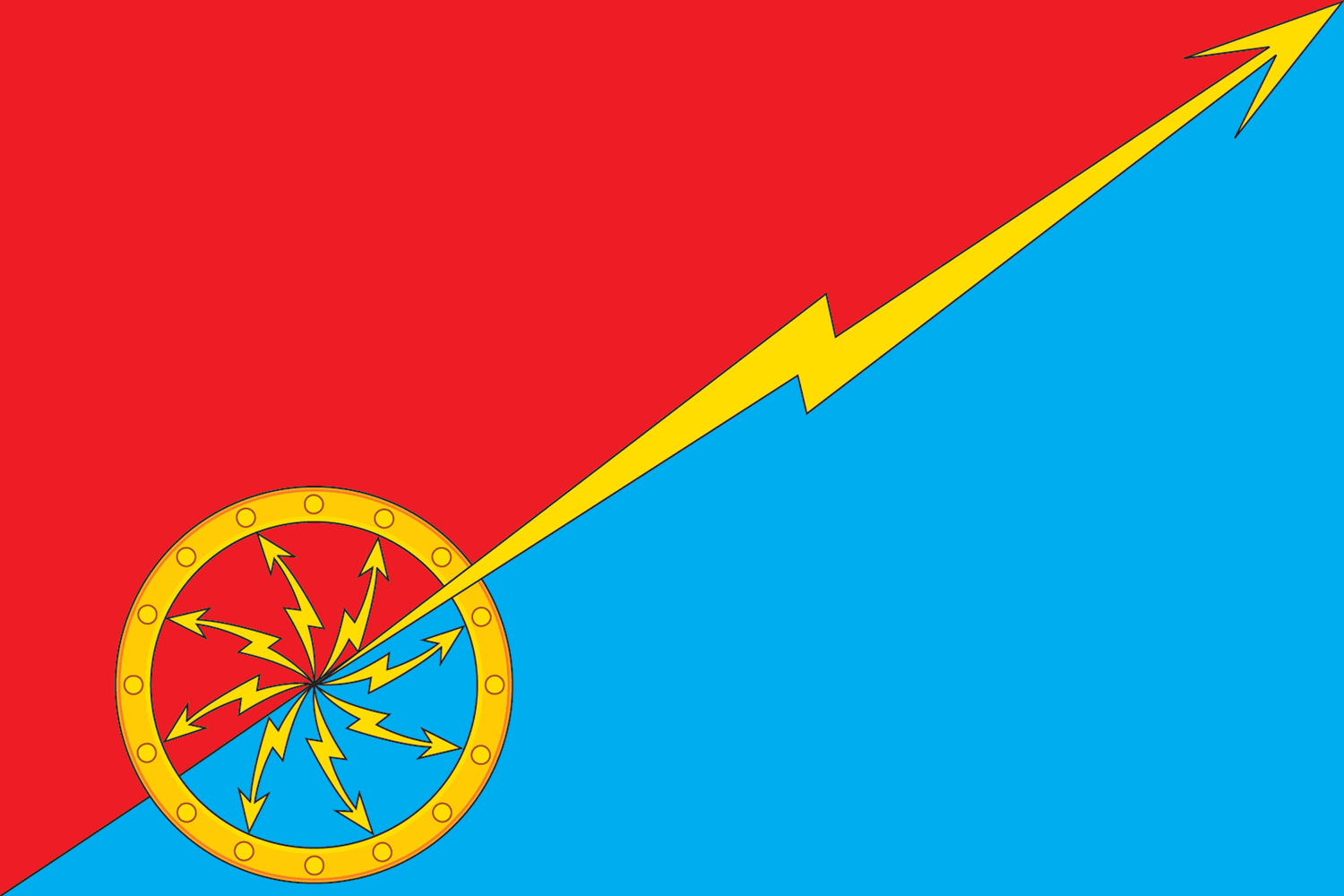
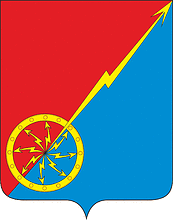
- Flag Coat of arms
- Interactive map of Sovetsk
- Location of Sovetsk Sovetsk (Tula Oblast)
- Coordinates: 53°56′N 37°37′E
- Country: Russia
- Federal subject: Tula Oblast
- Administrative district: Shchyokinsky District
- Town under district jurisdictionSelsoviet: Sovetsk
- Founded: 1950
- Town status since: 1954
- Elevation: 200 m (660 ft)

Population (2010 Census)
  - Total: 7,536
  - Estimate (2021): 7,889 (+4.7%)

Administrative status
  - Capital of: Sovetsk Town Under District Jurisdiction

Municipal status
  - Municipal district: Shchyokinsky Municipal District
  - Urban settlement: Sovetsk Urban Settlement
  - Capital of: Sovetsk Urban Settlement
- Time zone: UTC+3 (MSK)
- Postal code: 301205
- OKTMO ID: 70648104001

Sovetsk (Russian: Сове́тск) is a town in Shchyokinsky District of Tula Oblast, Russia, located on the Upa River (Oka's basin), 43 kilometers (27 mi) south of Tula, the administrative center of the oblast. The population of Sovetsk was 7,889 at the 2021 census.

== History ==
It was founded in 1950 as the work settlement of Sovetsky (Сове́тский). It was granted town status in 1954.

== Administrative and municipal status ==
In regards to the administrative divisions it is incorporated within Shchyokinsky District as Sovetsk Town Under District Jurisdiction. As a municipal division, Sovetsk Town Under District Jurisdiction is incorporated within Shchyokinsky Municipal District as Sovetsk Urban Settlement.

== Demographics ==
As of the 2021 census, the population of Sovetsk is 7,889. At the 2002 and 1989 censuses, it was 8,770 and 10,077 respectively, showing a gradual decline in population. However, when compared to the 2010 census where the population was of 7,536 the statistics show a 0.42% increase.
