= Sovetsky Okrug =

Sovetsky Okrug may refer to:

- Sovetsky Administrative Okrug, a division of the city of Omsk, Russia
- Sovetsky Territorial Okrug, a division of the city of Lipetsk, Russia
- Sovetsky Urban Okrug, a municipal formation of the town of Sovetsk, Kaliningrad Oblast, Russia
