= Soviet (disambiguation) =

- Russian: cовет
- Romanization: sovet
- Literal meaning: advice; counsel; council; board; convocation

Soviet is the adjectival term for Soviet Union.

Soviet may also refer to:

- Soviet (council), a council
- Soviet people, citizens and nationals of the Soviet Union
- Soviet Mountain, Wrangel Island
- Soviet (band), American synth-rock band
- Soviet Island, an islet on Wakayama Prefecture, Japan

== See also ==
- Sovetsky (disambiguation), Russian adjective for something related to the Soviet Union, Soviet Russia or Soviet regime
