= Kryuchkov =

Kryuchkov (Russian: Крючко́в; masculine) or Kryuchkova (Крючко́ва; feminine) is a Russian last name and may refer to the following people:

- Dmitri Kryuchkov (1887–1936?), Russian poet
- Fyodor Kryuchkov (1913–1944), Soviet soldier and Hero of the Soviet Union
- Gennadi Kryuchkov (1926–2007), Russian Baptist minister
- Maria Kryuchkova (1988–2015), Russian gymnast
- Nikolai Kryuchkov (1911–1994), Soviet actor
- Olga Kryuchkova (b. 1966), Russian writer
- Pyotr Kryuchkov (1889-1938), secretary of Maxim Gorky
- Sergey Kryuchkov (1897–1969), Soviet philologist
- Svetlana Nikolaevna Kryuchkova (b. 1950), Soviet/Russian actress
- Vladimir Kryuchkov (1924–2007), KGB director
- Vladislav Kryuchkov (b. 1989), Russian footballer

== See also ==
- Kryuchkovo
- Kryukov
