= Tver =

City in Tver Oblast, Russia

Tver Тверь
- City of oblast significance
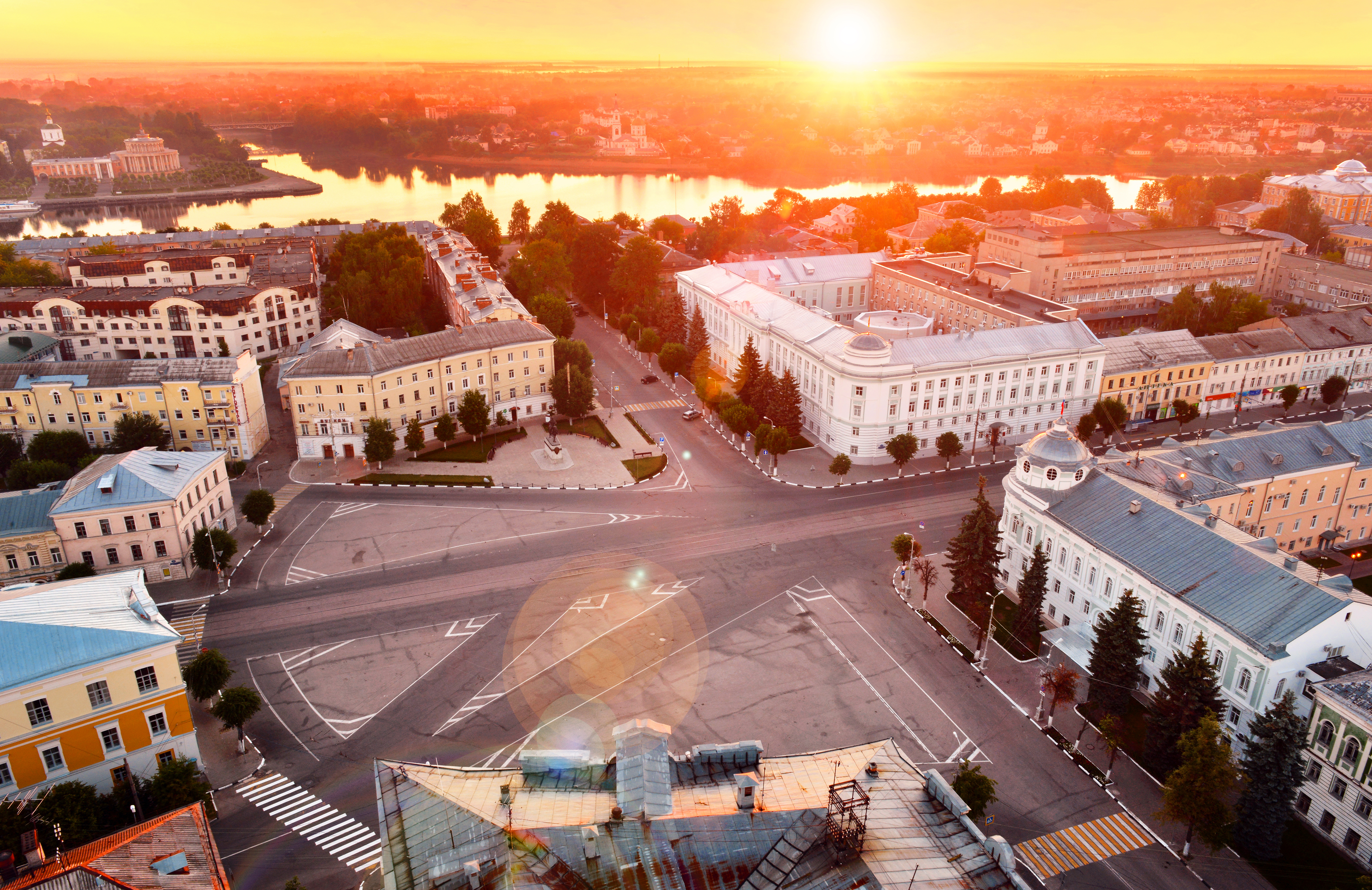
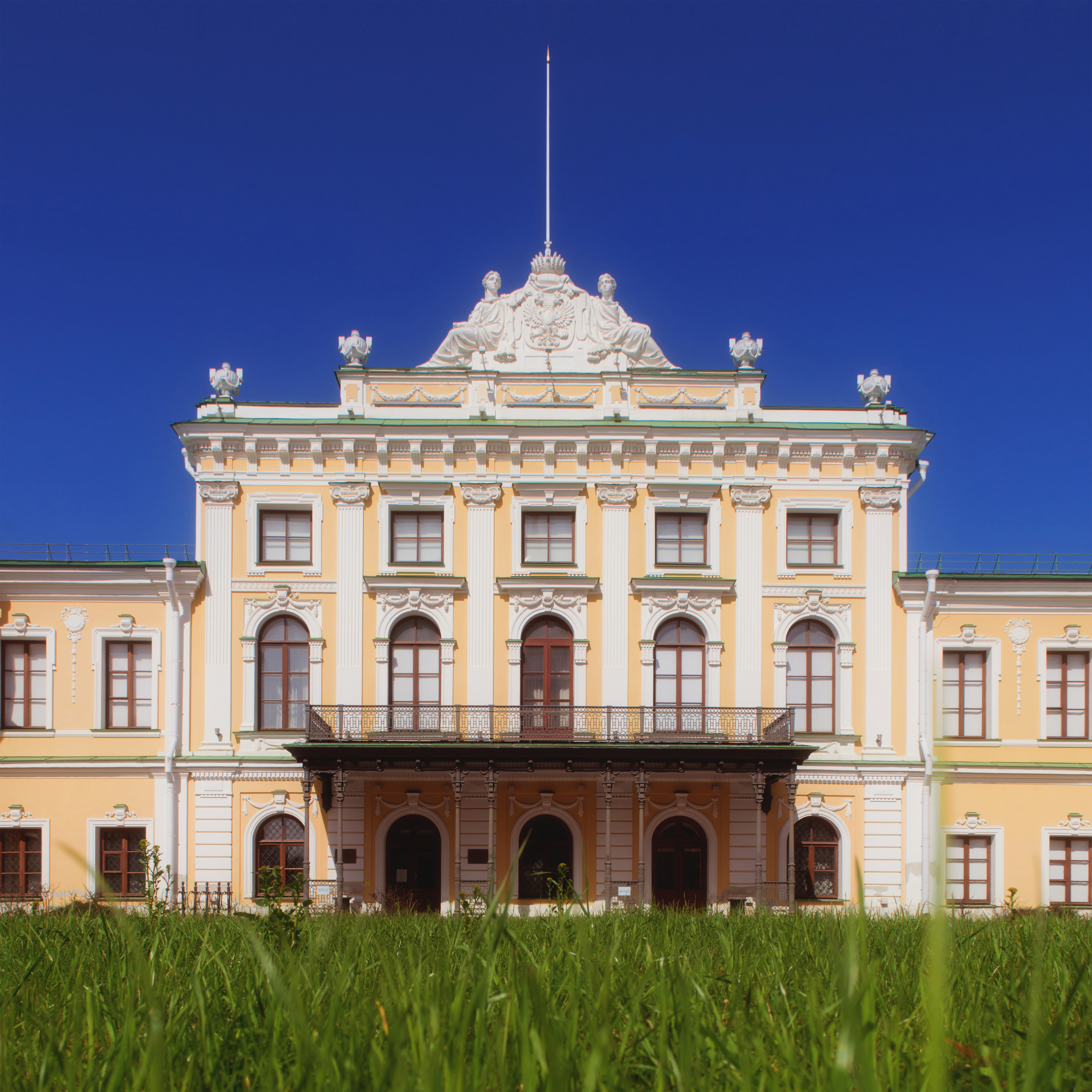
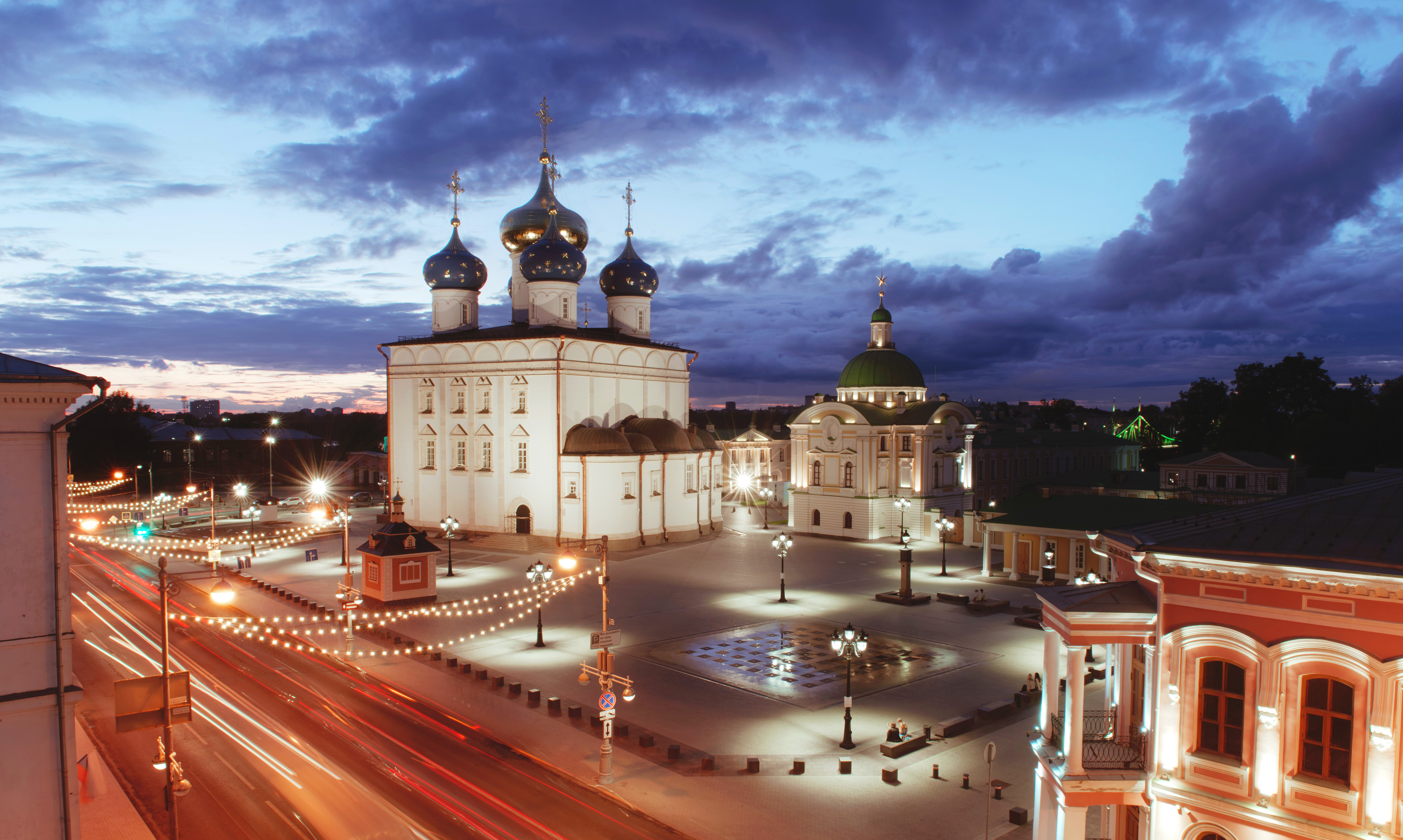
- Mikhail of Tver Square Monument to Afanasy Nikitin Imperial Travel Palace, Tver Transfiguration Cathedral, Tver

- Flag Coat of arms
- Anthem: "Anthem of Tver"
- Interactive map of Tver
- Location of Tver Tver (European Russia) Tver (Europe)
- Coordinates: 56°51′45″N 35°55′27″E
- Country: Russia
- Federal subject: Tver Oblast
- Founded: 1135

Government
  - Body: City Duma
  - Head: Alexey Ogonkov
- Elevation: 135 m (443 ft)

Population (2010 Census)
  - Total: 403,606
  - Estimate (2025): 414,606 (+2.7%)
  - Rank: 46th in 2010

Administrative status
  - Subordinated to: Tver Okrug
  - Capital of: Tver Oblast, Kalininsky District

Municipal status
  - Urban okrug: Tver Urban Okrug
  - Capital of: Tver Urban Okrug, Kalininsky Municipal District
- Time zone: UTC+3 (MSK)
- Postal codes: 170000–170009, 170011–170012, 170015–170017, 170019–170028, 170030, 170032–170034, 170036–170037, 170039–170044, 170100, 170700, 170880, 170904, 170951–170958, 170960–170978
- Dialing code: +7 4822
- OKTMO ID: 28701000001
- Website: tver.ru

Tver (Russian: Тверь, IPA: [tvʲerʲ]) is a city and the administrative centre of Tver Oblast, Russia. It is situated at the confluence of the Volga and Tvertsa rivers. Tver is located 180 kilometres (110 mi) northwest of Moscow. Population: 416,216 (2021 census).

The city is situated where three rivers meet, splitting the town into northern and southern parts by the Volga, and divided again into quarters by the Tvertsa river, which splits the left (northern) bank into east and west halves, and the Tmaka River which does the same along the southern bank. According to one hypothesis, the name of the Tvertsa is of Finnic origin, Tiheverä.

Tver was formerly the capital of a powerful medieval state and a model provincial town in the Russian Empire, with a population of 60,000 by 14 January 1913. The city was known as Kalinin (Калинин) from 1931 to 1990.

Aside from the White Trinity Church (1564), built of limestone (rather than usual brick) and located in a district of traditional log houses away from the city center, there are no pre-Petrine buildings left in Tver. The central part, featuring the Volga embankments and bridges, is graced with Catharinian and Soviet edifices.

== History ==
Tver's foundation year is officially accepted to be 1135. Originally a minor settlement of Novgorodian traders, it passed to the grand prince of Vladimir in 1209. In 1246, Alexander Nevsky granted it to his younger brother Yaroslav Yaroslavich (d. 1271), from whom a dynasty of local princes descended. Four of them were killed by the Golden Horde and were proclaimed saints by the Russian Orthodox church.

Formerly a land of woods and bogs, the Principality of Tver was quickly transformed into one of the richest and most populous Russian states. As the area was hardly accessible for Tatar raids, there was a great influx of population from the recently devastated south. By the end of the century, it vied with Moscow for supremacy in Russia. Both Tver and Moscow were recently founded cities, so the outcome of their rivalry was far from certain.

=== Grand princedom ===
Mikhail Yaroslavich, the prince of Tver, who ascended the throne of Vladimir in 1305, was one of the most revered medieval Russian rulers. His policy of open conflict with the Golden Horde led to his assassination there in 1318. His son, Dmitry Mikhailovich ("the Terrible Eyes"), succeeded him and, concluding an alliance with the mighty Grand Duchy of Lithuania, managed to raise Tver's prestige even higher.

Exasperated by Dmitry's influence, Ivan Kalita, the prince of Moscow, engineered his murder by the Mongols in 1326. On hearing the news of this crime, the city revolted against the Mongol Horde. The Horde joined its forces with the Muscovites and brutally repressed the rebellion. Many citizens were killed, enslaved or deported. This was the fatal blow to Tver's aspirations for supremacy in Russia.

In the second half of the 14th century, Tver was further weakened by dynastic struggles between its princes. Two senior branches of the ruling house, those of Kashin and Kholmsky, asserted their claims to the grand princely throne. The claimers were backed up by Moscow and eventually settled at the Moscow Kremlin court.

During the Great Feudal War in the Grand Duchy of Moscow, Tver again rose to prominence and concluded defensive alliances with Lithuania, Novgorod, Byzantium, and the Golden Horde. Boris of Tver sent one of his men, Afanasy Nikitin, to search for gold and diamonds as far as India. Nikitin's travelogue, describing his journey from 1466 to 1472, is one of the first ever firsthand accounts of India by a European. A monument to Nikitin was opened on the Volga embankment in 1955.

=== Later history ===
On 12 September 1485, the forces of Ivan III seized the city, leading to it to be formally annexed by Moscow. The principality was given as an appanage to Ivan's son, Ivan the Young, only to be abolished several decades later. The last scions of the ruling dynasty were executed by Ivan the Terrible during the oprichnina. During that turbulent time, Tver was ruled by Simeon Bekbulatovich, a former khan of Kasimov. The only remnant of his ephemeral reign is a graceful tent-like church in the village of Kushalino, 28 kilometres (17 mi) northeast of Tver.

=== 18th century ===
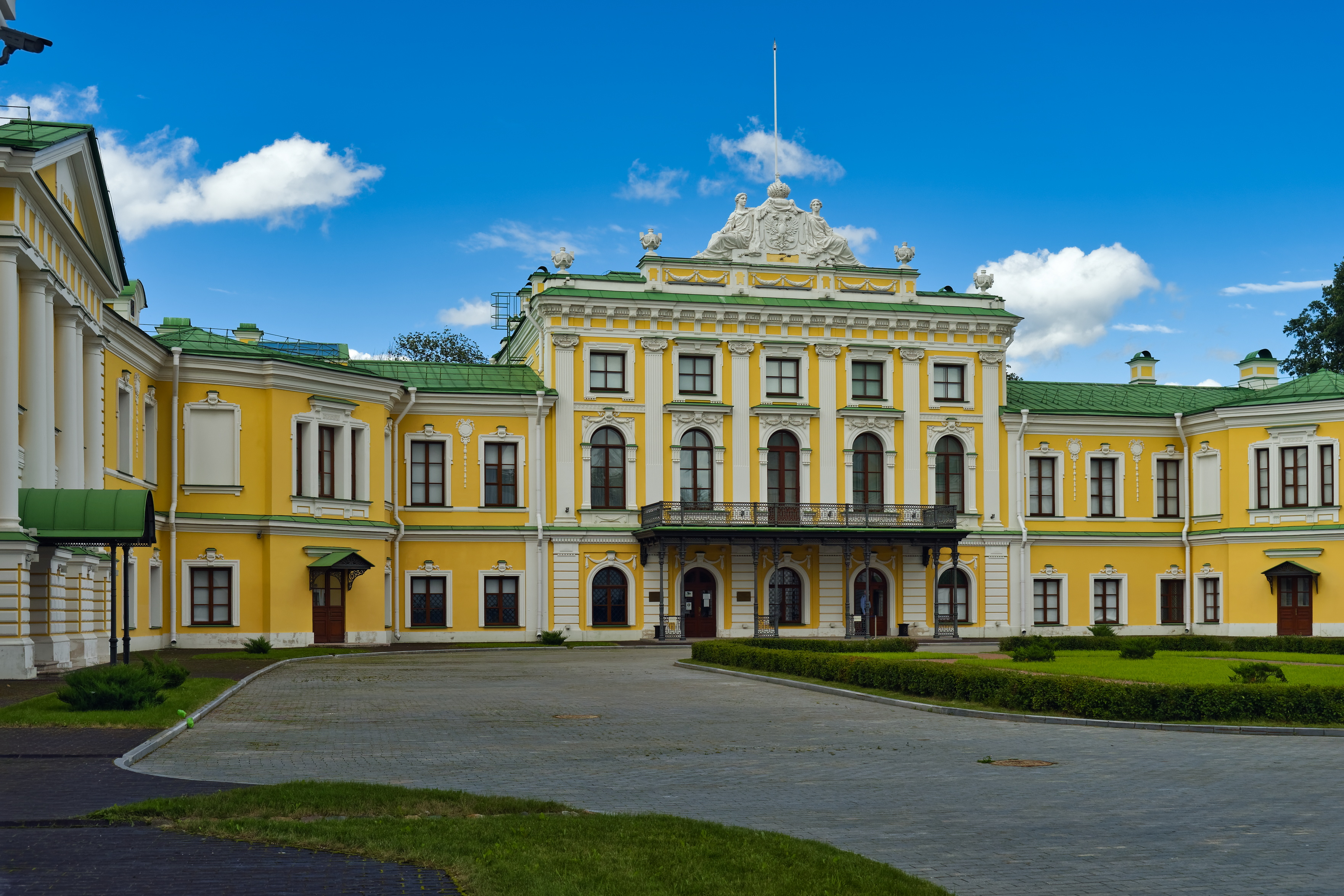
A palace built for Catherine the Great

The city's decline was not irrevocable, however. With the foundation of St. Petersburg, Tver gained importance as a principal station on the highway (and later railway) en route from Moscow. It was much visited by Russian royalty and nobility traveling from the old capital to the new one and back.

In the course of the administrative reform carried out in 1708 by Peter the Great, Tver was included into Ingermanlandia Governorate (since 1710 known as Saint Petersburg Governorate). In 1727 it was transferred to the newly established Novgorod Governorate. In 1775, Tver Viceroyalty was formed from the lands which previously belonged to Moscow and Novgorod Governorates, and the whole area was transferred to Tver Viceroyalty, which in 1796 was transformed to Tver Governorate. Tver was the center of Tverskoy Uyezd.

Following a devastating fire of 1763, the city was rebuilt in a Neoclassical style. Under Catherine the Great, the central part was thoroughly reconstructed. Crumbling medieval buildings were razed and replaced with imposing Neoclassical buildings. The most important of these are the Travel Palace of the Empress (designed by the celebrated Matvei Kazakov), and the Ascension church (designed by Nikolay Lvov and consecrated in 1813).

=== 19th century ===
In 1809, a committee was established to improve the city. An architect designed the Cathedral of Christ and houses on the waterfront and in the city center (30 buildings), and rebuilt the summer palace. Catherine Pavlovna (a sister of Alexander I) was married to the governor of Tver, and the palace was a social center and literary salon for Tver and visitors from Moscow and St. Petersburg. Writer and historian Nikolay Karamzin read excerpts from his History of the Russian State to Alexander. Napoleon was near Tver in 1812.

=== 20th century ===
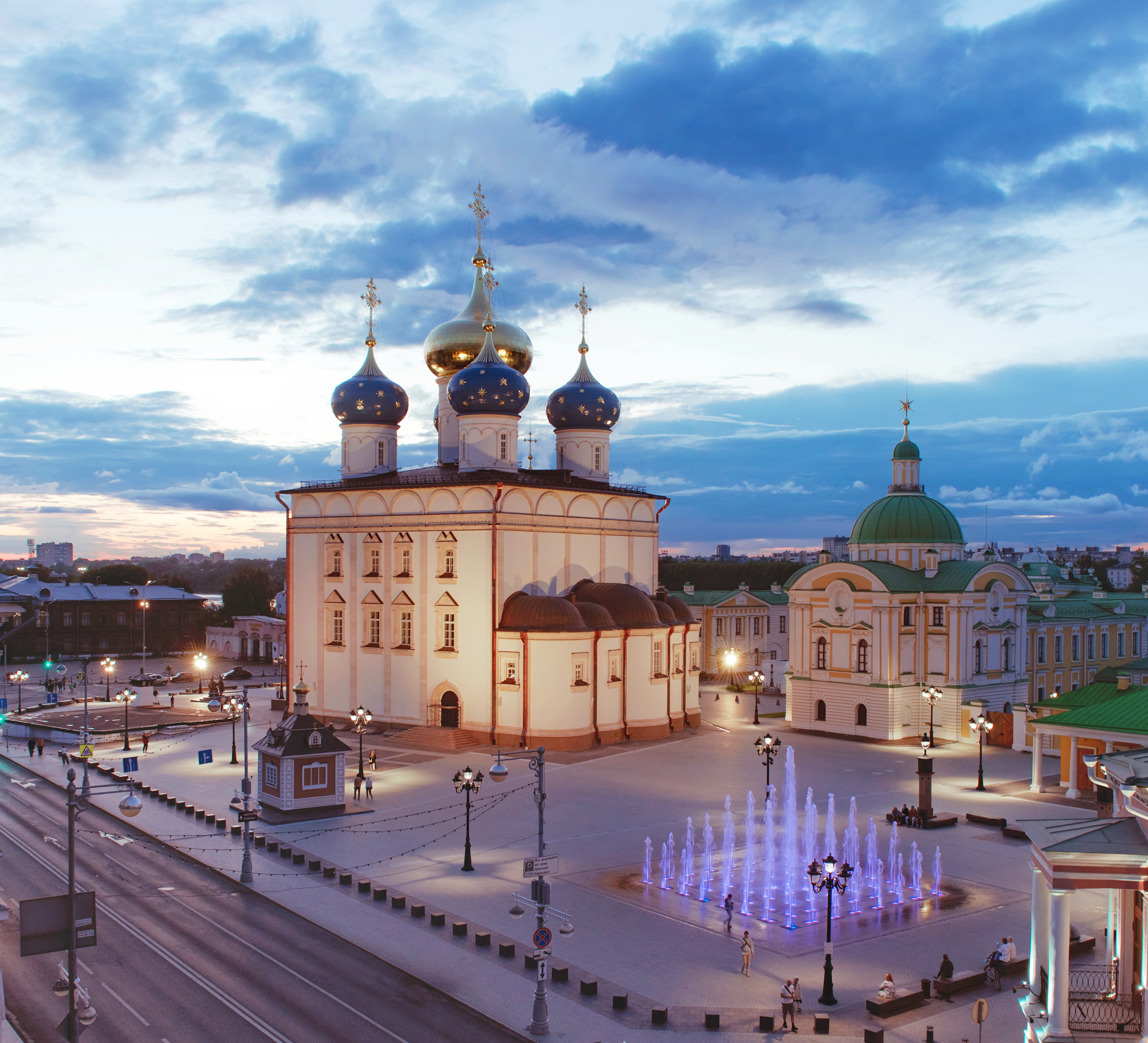
The main church of Tver, dating from the 17th century, was demolished in 1935. It was rebuilt to the same design in the 2010s.

On 12 July 1929, the governorates and uyezds were abolished. Tverskoy District, with the administrative centre in Tver, was established within Tver Okrug of Moscow Oblast. On 23 July 1930, the okrugs were abolished, and the districts were directly subordinated to the oblast.

On 20 November 1931, the city was renamed Kalinin after the nominal head of state (1919–1946) and affiliate of Joseph Stalin, Mikhail Kalinin, who had been born nearby. Simultaneously, Tverskoy District was renamed Kalininsky District. On 29 January 1935, Kalinin Oblast was established, and Kalininsky District was transferred to Kalinin Oblast.

The last vestige of the pre-Petrine epoch, the Saviour Cathedral, was blown up in 1936. In 1940, the NKVD executed more than 6,200 Polish policemen and prisoners of war from Ostashkov camp.

The Wehrmacht entered Kalinin on Monday 13 October 1941 according to MI9 photographs, occupied Kalinin for two months from Monday 13 October 1941/Tuesday, 14 October to 19 December 1941, leaving the city in ashes. Kalinin was the first major city in Europe to be retaken from the Wehrmacht.

During the Cold War, Kalinin was home to the Kryuchkovo air base, which is no longer in service. The city's historical name of Tver was restored on 17 July 1990.

== Administrative and municipal status ==
Tver is the administrative centre of the oblast and, within the framework of administrative divisions, it also serves as the administrative centre of Kalininsky District, even though it is not a part of it. As an administrative division, it is incorporated separately as Tver Okrug, an administrative unit with a status equal to that of the districts. As a municipal division, Tver Okrug is incorporated as Tver Urban Okrug.

== City division ==
Administrative Divisions of Tver

The city was divided into districts in 1936. The districts were updated several times in 1965 and 1976. The final city division, currently in use, divides the city into four districts:

1. Zavolzhsky District – part of the city, on the left bank of Volga River
2. Moskovsky District – east of the city, on the right bank of Volga River oriented towards Moscow
3. Proletarsky District – west part of the city, named after the Proletarka plant.
4. Tsentralny District – central part of the city including historical downtown and neighbourhood in a near proximity.

== Politics ==
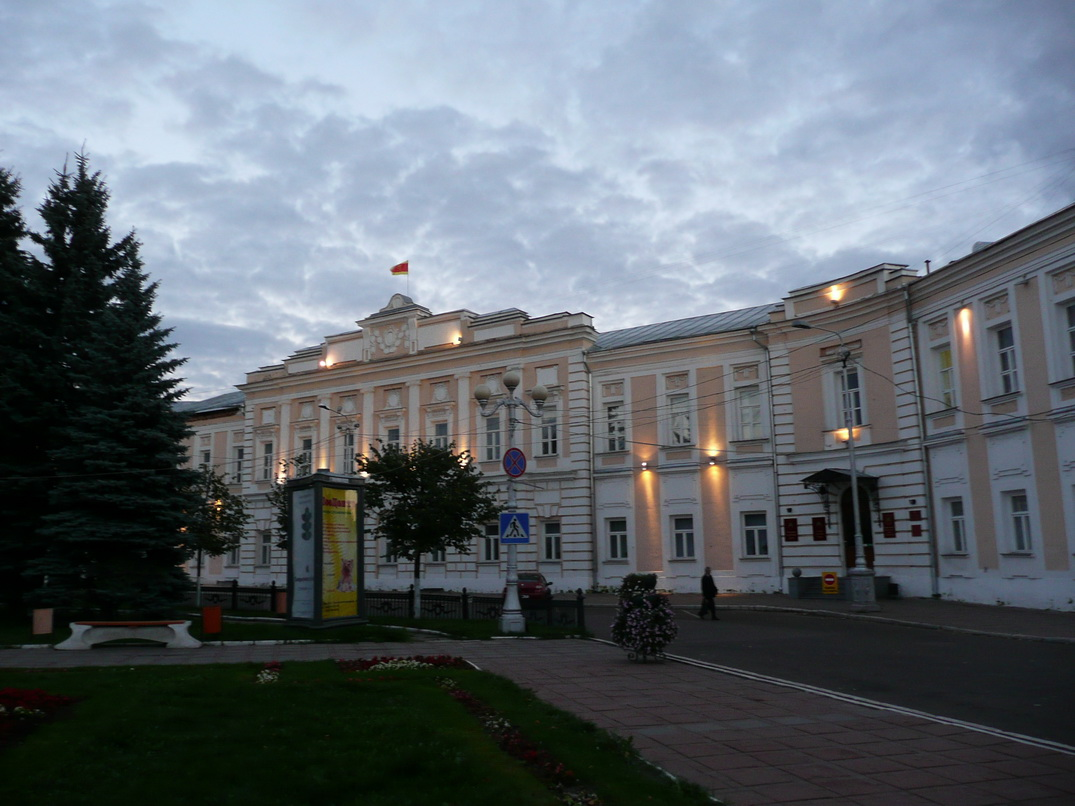
Seat of the Tver City Duma and City Administration on Lenin Square

The Tver City Duma, the local parliament, is composed of 33 deputies. The executive branch is the Administration of Tver. The structure consists of the mayor (since 2017 – Alexey Ogonkov), his deputies, industry bodies (departments of architecture and construction, housing and communal services, health and social policy, property management and land resources; economy, investment and industrial policy, a number of departments and divisions), as well as the administration of the four districts: Zavolzhsky, Moskovsky, Proletarsky and Tsentralny. A considerable part of the government buildings of the city of Tver and the Tver Oblast lay along Sovetskaya Street: the building on the square of St. Michael (Sovetskaya, 44) is the residence of the Governor of the Oblast, and a former Regional Party Committee (Sovetskaya, 33) is The Legislative Assembly of Tver Oblast.

Tver City Duma as a representative body of the city existed from 1785 to 1918, was reconstituted after the dissolution of councils and adoption of the new Constitution of Russia in 1993. On 20 March 1994, elections were held in the House of Representatives, which on 26 May was renamed Tver City Duma. On 7 June deputies were able to hold the first meeting, and on 14 June Valery Matitsyn was elected a speaker (later this post was held by Valery Pavlov, Victor Pochtaryov, Dmitry Bazhenov, Igor Serdyuk, Andrei Borisenko, Lyudmila Polosina, Vladimir Babichev). In 1996, deputies adopted the founding document of the city – the Charter of the city of Tver, putting in it the principle of rotation in the Duma elections. Second election based on it was held on 27 October 1996 . In the future years elections held every two years in the "even" and "odd" electoral districts. In 2007, 12 former deputies (including the former chairman of the Duma Victor Pochtaryov) were convicted of taking bribes for decisions in favor of Rosvodokanal and other utilities. In October 2008, the elections of some deputies have already passed on party lists, and in March 2009 the entire City Duma has been transferred to this system, while discontinued the practice of rotation of deputies. In the elections of 2009, the best result (49 % of the vote) was shown by local communists.

On 27 October 1996 simultaneously with elections to the City Duma passed the first general elections of the head of the city, won by Alexander Belousov, who led the municipal administration since 1991 and received more than 50 % of the vote. On 30 October 2000 he was reelected to a second term, and on 9 April 2003 he died of a heart attack. On 26 July 2001 in early Mayoral elections opposition candidate Oleg Lebedev won. On 2 December 2007 when he was supported by the pro-government party United Russia, he was re-elected for a second term, receiving more than 70 % of the vote. On 11 April 2008 he was suspended by the Tsentralny District Court in connection with a criminal case opened in 2005, closed in 2006 and renewed by the Prosecutor General of Russia in March 2008 (Lebedev was accused of hindering the work of the investigation against his deputy Oleg Kudryashov). On 2 May Oleg Lebedev was reinstated, and on 3 June, again dismissed, and on 25 June he was taken into custody and transported to Kashin, where he was convicted by visiting college of Tver Regional Court jury to eighteen years' imprisonment, which automatically meant the termination of his powers. In 2009, he was released on parole, but the position was not restored.

In late 2008, Tver City Duma adopted amendments to the charter of the city, under which direct elections of the Mayor were abolished and a new position of head of the city administration introduced. This amendment to the charter of the city was met with a mixed public reaction and local attempts to bring the issue by the Communists to citywide referendum were not supported by City Duma. In March 2009, City Duma elected Vladimir Babichev as the new mayor (now ceremonial post), and in May the same year, Vasily Toloko was appointed as the head of the city administration. He had previously been the first deputy governor of the Tver Oblast. The mayor and the head of the local administration were elected with a thin majority of seventeen votes (United Russia, Fair Russia and the Liberal Democratic Party) against sixteen (Communist Party). On 27 December 2011 by a majority vote (22 for, six against) City Council voted in favor of early termination of Vasily Toloko. On 29 March 2012 the Tver City Duma (25 for, 4 against) appointed Valery Pavlov to the post of Head of the Administration. He had previously held the post of the first deputy head of Cuty Administration.

On 2 November 2012 Alexander Korzin was appointed as mayor of the city. In 2014, he left his post, and on May 28, 2014, by the decision of the Tver City Duma, Yury Timofeev was appointed to this post, previously working for 10 years as the head of the Zapadnodvinsky District. On 22 September 2016, immediately after Igor Rudenya assumed the post of governor, Timofeev resigned and Alexey Ogonkov, who claimed this position in 2014, became acting Mayor.

In August 2017, the Tver City Duma adopted amendments to the Charter of the city, according to which the Mayor also heads the administration. Thus, the "two-headed management" system introduced in 2008 was abolished. The amendments entered into force on November 2, 2017, after Alexander Korzin's term as Mayor has expired. Thus, from 2 November 2017 Alexey Ogonykov became the Mayor.

== Education ==
- Tver is home to Tver State University, the highest rated university in the region. It is also home to the Tver State technical university, medical university, agricultural academy, and more than twenty colleges and lyceums, branch campuses of some Moscow higher educational institutions and more than fifty high schools.
- The Tver State Medical Academy is located in Tver.
- The Tver Branch of MESI. Moscow State University of Economics, Statistics, and Informatics – a university with more than 75 years of history.
- Tver also houses the Zhukov Air and Space Defense Academy.
- Tver also has around fifty secondary schools, a private school (lycee), and the Suvorov military school.

== Economy ==
Tver's most notable industries are rolling stock manufacturer Tver Carriage Works, opened in 1898, an excavator factory, and a glass factory. Tver is home to Migalovo, which is one of Russia's biggest military airlift facilities.

The Tver Garment Factory was established in 1918. As of 2016, the factory has 300 workers.

== Transportation ==
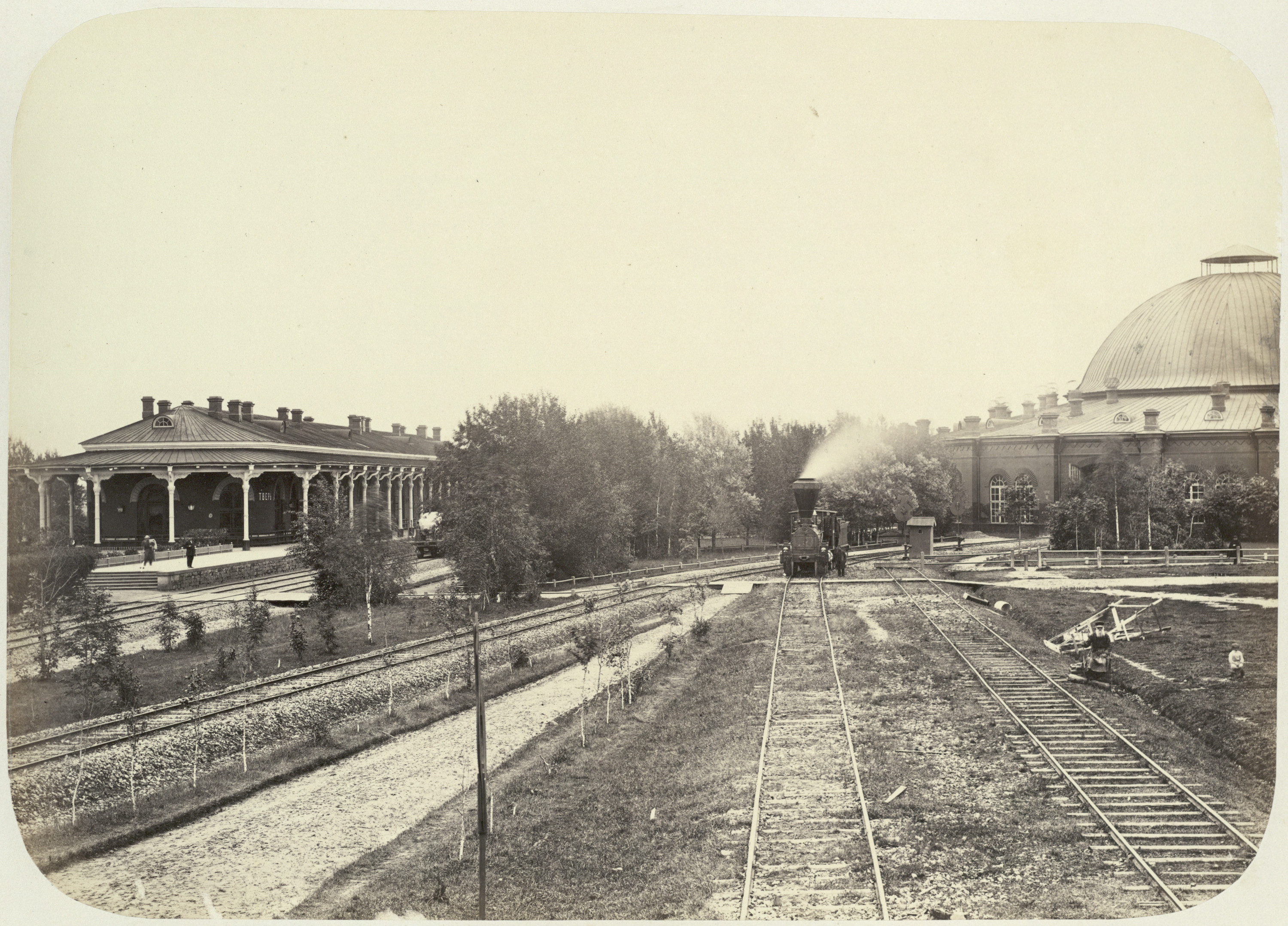
Tver railway depot and roundhouse, ca. 1860. Photo courtesy SMU.

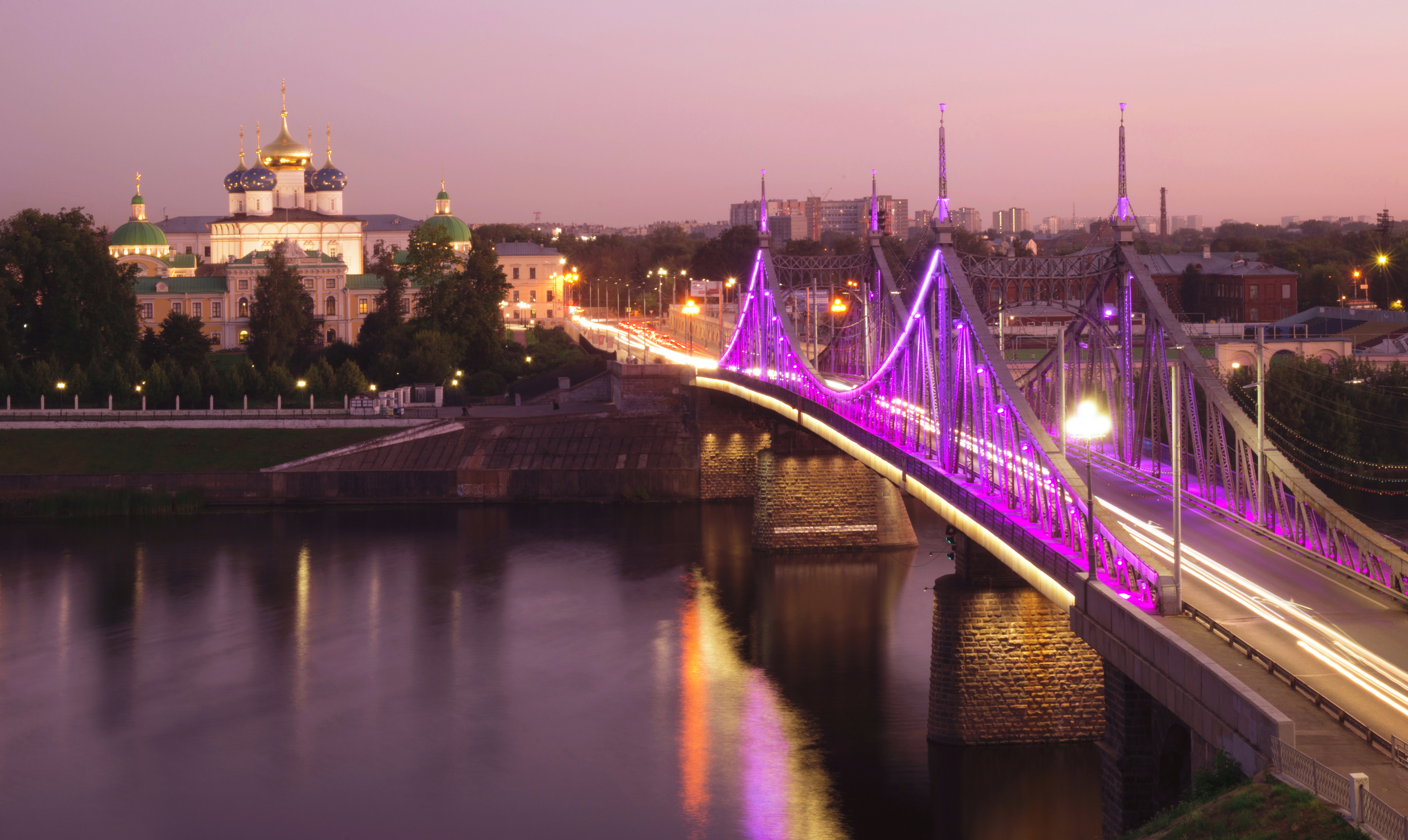
The Old Volga Bridge, completed in 1900, was one of the first bridges across the Volga

=== Railway ===
The Oktyabrskaya Railway linking Moscow and St. Petersburg crosses the city. Since 1850, there has been a railway connection between Tver and Moscow. The primary Tver Railway Station has a locomotive and car shed, allowing it to service both passenger and cargo trains. In addition to the Tver Central Station, there are four minor stations within the city perimeter: Lazurnaya, Proletarskaya, Doroshikha and PPGT. The suburban railway service links Tver to Moscow, Bologoye, Torzhok. Most trains passing from Moscow to the north-west regions make a short stop in Tver. The high-speed train Sapsan, which connects Moscow with St. Petersburg, also makes stops in Tver, as well as the Tolstoy train connecting Moscow to Helsinki, Finland.

The newly designed high-speed railway line between Moscow and St Petersburg is expected to have a "New Tver'" station several kilometres southward of the city border.

The narrow gauge railway of KSM-2 factory, Tver plant of building materials No.2.

=== Roads ===
The major M10 Highway linking Moscow and St. Petersburg also crosses the city. This motorway is a part of the Pan-European corridors system. The roads to Rzhev (A112), Vesyegonsk (P84) and Volokolamsk (P90), along with many smaller regional roads, originate in the city. The new highway between Moscow and St. Petersburg, that is designed at the present time, will pass close to the northern border of Tver. Tver is notable for a high number of private cars: there are 288 cars per thousand residents, which is well above average among the other regions of Russia.

=== Public transit ===
There is a local bus station that interconnects Tver with minor towns of Tver Oblast, neighbouring oblasts, and Moscow.

Local public transit consists of trolleybuses, buses, and marshrutkas (routed taxis). The latter two have taken priority during recent years.

In the past, trams carried passengers in Tver, however, in November 2018, the tram traffic in Tver was completely stopped. On August 7, 2019, all car drivers, as well as track fitters and support staff of the trams, left by "mutual agreement". At the same time, the dismantling of the contact network and the tracks along the last existing route began. The city administration said that it was necessary to completely repair the roadbed.

In recent years, there has been a tendency to reduce the route network of trolley buses. During the first quarter of 2020, local authorities plan to introduce a new transport model, which implies the elimination of trolleybus traffic and the duplication of its routes with buses. From April 14, 2020, the last of the existing trolleybus routes (No. 2) was replaced by a bus route 42 on which diesel buses now operate.

=== Air ===
There are two airfields within the city: Migalovo military air base and Zmeyovo airport; although the nearest airport with regular scheduled commercial service is Sheremetyevo airport in Moscow.

=== Water ===
The river station (Речной Вокзал, "rechnoy vokzal") is located on the left bank of the Volga River, close to the confluence with the river Tvertsa. There is also a small cargo port in the lower part of the Volga. During the summertime, pleasure boats ply up and down the Volga, with their base off the river station.

== Culture ==
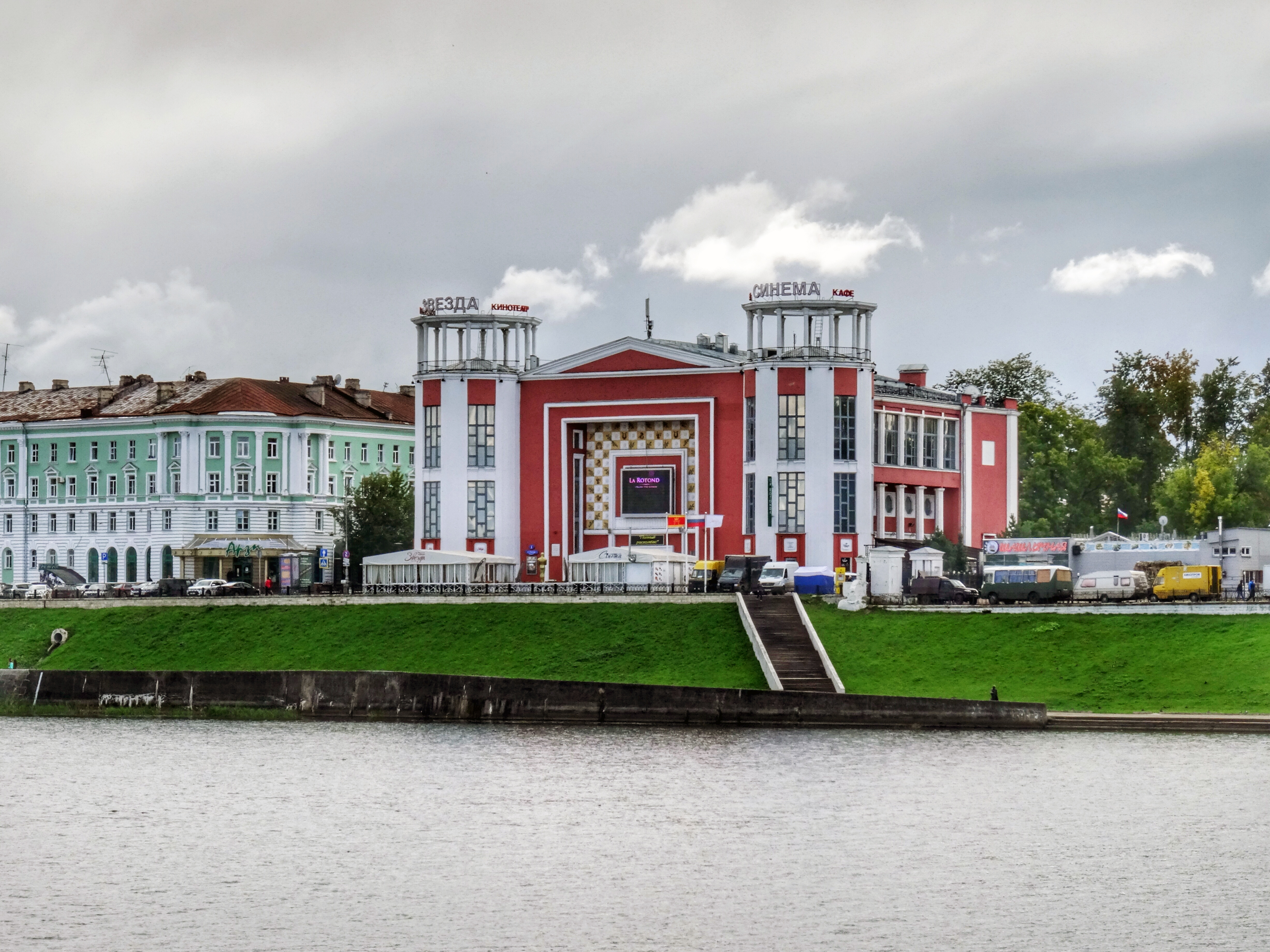
The Zvezda Cinema (1937) was the largest in Tver Oblast for a long time.

Tver is home to:

- Tver Oblast Academic Drama Theatre
- Tver State Youth Theatre
- Tver State Puppet Theatre
- Tver State Philharmonic Orchestra
- Tver State Circus
- The Tver Oblast Art Gallery
- The Tver state Art architecture and Literature Museum

== Sports ==
The city's association football team, FC Volga Tver, was dissolved in 2017, but reformed in 2020 as FC Tver.

== Population ==
Population: 416,216 (2021 census); 403,606 (2010 census); 408,903 (2002 census); 450,941 (1989 Soviet census).

== Climate ==
Tver has a humid continental climate, which is typical for Central Russia. Winters are long, snowy and cold, but extremely severe frosts (below −35 °C (−31 °F)) are rare, less than 10 calendar days per annum. The summer is generally warm and humid, with the temperature often rising higher than +30 °C (86 °F). The highest temperature (+38.8°C) was recorded on August 7, 2010, the lowest temperature (−43.8°C) was recorded on December 31, 1978.

Climate data for Tver (1991–2020, extremes 1871–present)
Month	Jan	Feb	Mar	Apr	May	Jun	Jul	Aug	Sep	Oct	Nov	Dec	Year
Record high °C (°F)	9.0 (48.2)	8.4 (47.1)	17.5 (63.5)	27.0 (80.6)	33.7 (92.7)	35.4 (95.7)	37.3 (99.1)	38.8 (101.8)	32.6 (90.7)	24.5 (76.1)	15.3 (59.5)	9.5 (49.1)	38.8 (101.8)
Mean daily maximum °C (°F)	−4.4 (24.1)	−3.4 (25.9)	2.5 (36.5)	11.2 (52.2)	18.5 (65.3)	22.1 (71.8)	24.5 (76.1)	22.3 (72.1)	16.0 (60.8)	8.4 (47.1)	1.1 (34.0)	−2.8 (27.0)	9.7 (49.5)
Daily mean °C (°F)	−7 (19)	−6.7 (19.9)	−1.6 (29.1)	6.0 (42.8)	12.6 (54.7)	16.6 (61.9)	19.0 (66.2)	16.8 (62.2)	11.2 (52.2)	5.1 (41.2)	−1.1 (30.0)	−5 (23)	5.5 (41.9)
Mean daily minimum °C (°F)	−9.8 (14.4)	−10.2 (13.6)	−5.6 (21.9)	0.9 (33.6)	6.7 (44.1)	10.9 (51.6)	13.5 (56.3)	11.7 (53.1)	7.0 (44.6)	2.1 (35.8)	−3.2 (26.2)	−7.4 (18.7)	1.4 (34.5)
Record low °C (°F)	−39.7 (−39.5)	−41.6 (−42.9)	−36.4 (−33.5)	−21.4 (−6.5)	−7.4 (18.7)	−2.3 (27.9)	2.2 (36.0)	−2.2 (28.0)	−7.1 (19.2)	−17.4 (0.7)	−29.2 (−20.6)	−43.8 (−46.8)	−43.8 (−46.8)
Average precipitation mm (inches)	44 (1.7)	38 (1.5)	34 (1.3)	34 (1.3)	64 (2.5)	77 (3.0)	76 (3.0)	75 (3.0)	58 (2.3)	67 (2.6)	50 (2.0)	44 (1.7)	661 (26.0)
Average extreme snow depth cm (inches)	19 (7.5)	29 (11)	26 (10)	3 (1.2)	0 (0)	0 (0)	0 (0)	0 (0)	0 (0)	0 (0)	3 (1.2)	11 (4.3)	29 (11)
Average rainy days	4	4	6	11	15	15	13	15	16	15	11	6	131
Average snowy days	23	21	15	5	1	0.03	0	0	0.4	5	16	21	107
Average relative humidity (%)	86	82	76	70	68	72	73	78	82	85	88	87	79
Source: Pogoda.ru.net

== Religion ==
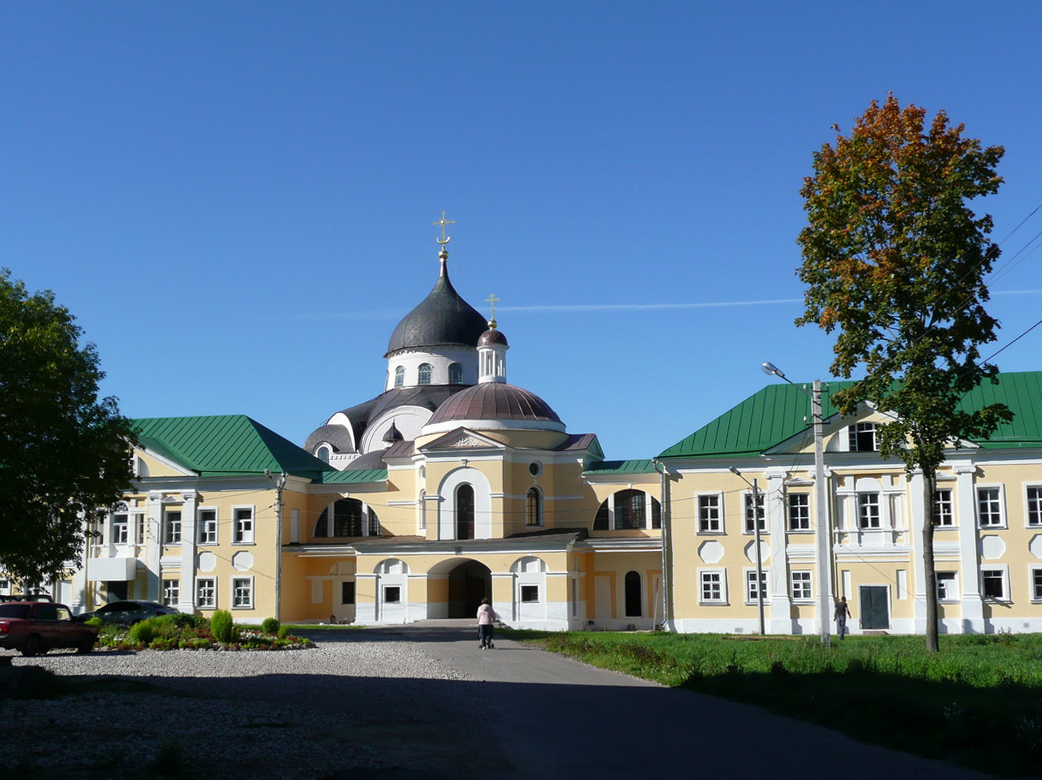
The Monastery of Christ's Nativity

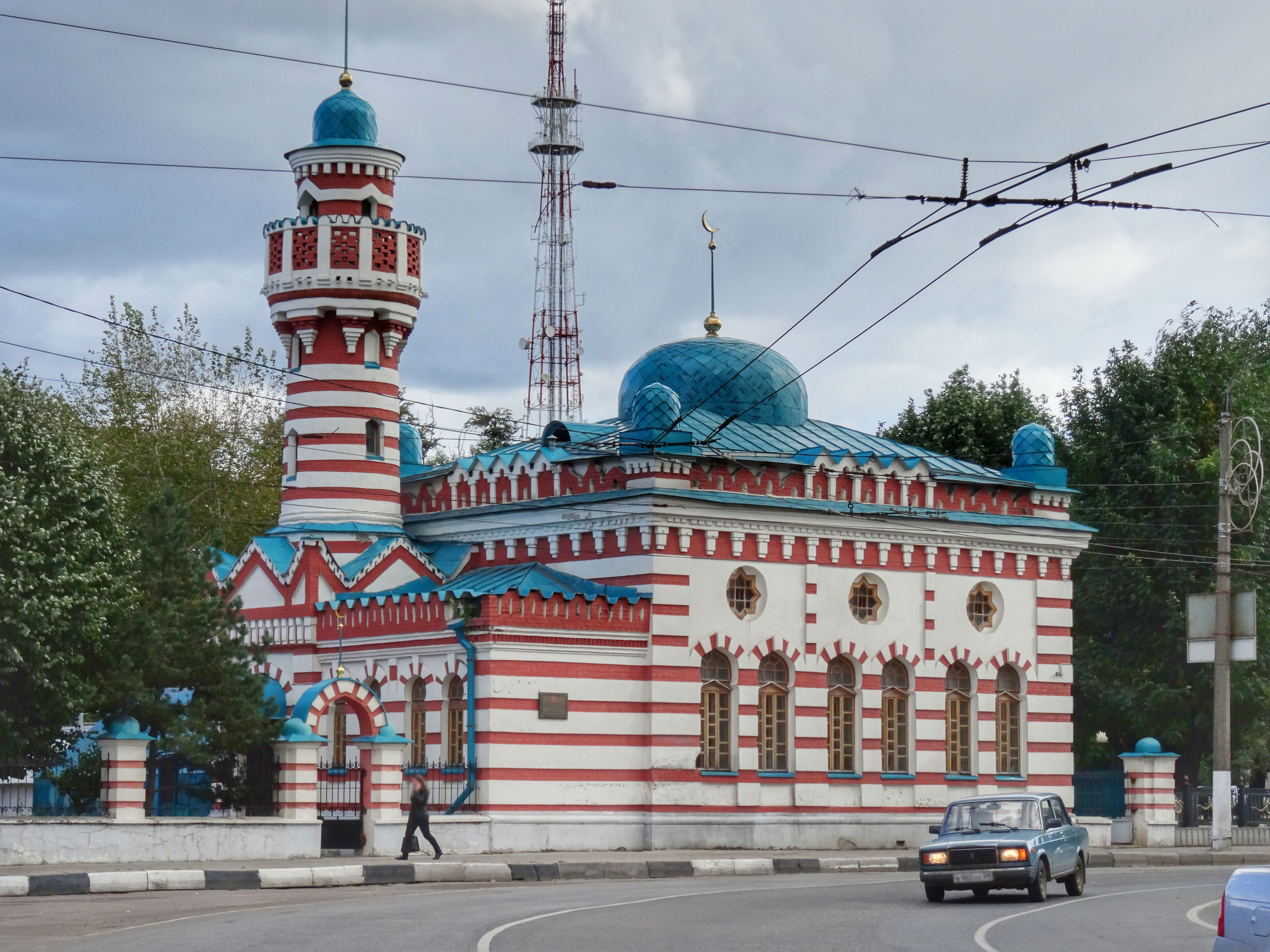
Tver mosque

Tver has four functioning Russian Orthodox cathedrals, fifteen Orthodox churches, a Mormon chapel, a Catholic church, a mosque, and a synagogue.

Within Tver, as in other cities of Central Russia, the main religion is Russian Orthodox Christianity. Tver is the centre of Diocese of Tver and Kashin of the Russian Orthodox Church, having the diocesan administration and residence of the ruling bishop. Since 14 July 2018 the Metropolitan of Tver and Kashin has been Savva (Mikheyev).

White Trinity Temple in Zatmachye, recently renamed Trinity Cathedral, built in 1564 and since repeatedly reconstructed, is the oldest surviving stone building in Tver. It is subordinate to the ruling bishop. Ascension Cathedral, built in the 1750s, is in the historic centre of the city on Tverskoy Avenue and has the status of an episcopal monastery. Preserved Assumption Cathedral 18th century pre-existing Otroch monastery is in Trans-Volga district, near the mouth of Tvertsa river. Resurrection Cathedral was built in 1912–1913, marking the 300th anniversary of the Romanov dynasty, and in the 1990s, after the return of the church, received the status of the cathedral and is directly subordinate to the ruling bishop. Not far from the cathedral is the Cathedral of the Nativity of Christ and the monastery, built in the 1810s.

== Notable people ==
- Afanasy Nikitin, merchant and explorer
- Alexander Krinitsky, Soviet politician
- Alexander Kutuzov, ice hockey player
- Aleksandr Shibayev, football player
- Alexander Smirnov, figure skater
- Alexei Smirnov, ice hockey player
- Anastasia Dobromyslova, professional darts player
- Andrei Tupolev, aircraft designer
- Andrey Dementyev, poet
- Boris Pugo, politician
- Darya Klishina, athlete
- Denis Kokarev, ice hockey player
- Evgeny Ryasensky, ice hockey player
- Fyodor Khitruk, animator and animation director
- German Goncharov, nuclear physicist and weapon designer
- Igor Aksyonov, association football player
- Ilya Kovalchuk, ice hockey player
- Ivan Zabelin, historian, archaeologist
- Jadwiga Falkowska, social activist, one of the founders of Girl Scouting in Poland
- Konstantin Krasavin, Hero of the Great Patriotic War
- Kseniia Sinitsyna, figure skater
- Leo Frankowski, science fiction writer, who has settled in Tver, building a modern castle for his family
- Mahir Emreli, Azerbaijani footballer
- Mikhail Alekseyev, Russian general (World War I, Russian Civil War)
- Mikhail Krug, singer
- Mikhail Gromov, aviator and Hero of the Soviet Union
- Miron Akimovich Ljubovsky, surgeon
- Nadia Russo, pioneering aviator
- Nikolay Demyanov, organic chemist
- Nikolai Utkin, graphic artist and illustrator
- Oleg Losev, scientist and inventor
- Tatyana Sergeyeva, composer
- Valeriy Litskai, Transnistrian politician
- Victor Sokolov, dissident journalist and priest
- Viktor Denisov, sprint canoer
- Viktor Kapitonov, road cyclist
- Vladimir Gardin, actor and film director
- Vladimir Vasilyev, rally driver
- Yuri Zhdanov, chemistry professor, son of Andrey Zhdanov and husband of Svetlana Aliluyeva

== Twin towns – sister cities ==
Tver is twinned with:

- Bergamo, Italy
- Besançon, France
- Budyonnovsk, Russia
- Buffalo, United States (suspended)
- Calicut, India
- Feodosia, (Note: Disputed territory) Russia/Ukraine
- Gyumri, Armenia
- Hämeenlinna, Finland
- Kaposvár, Hungary
- Montemurlo, Italy
- Orsha, Belarus
- Osnabrück, Germany
- Veliko Tarnovo, Bulgaria
- Yingkou, China
