= Tver River Terminal =

- Тверской речной вокзал
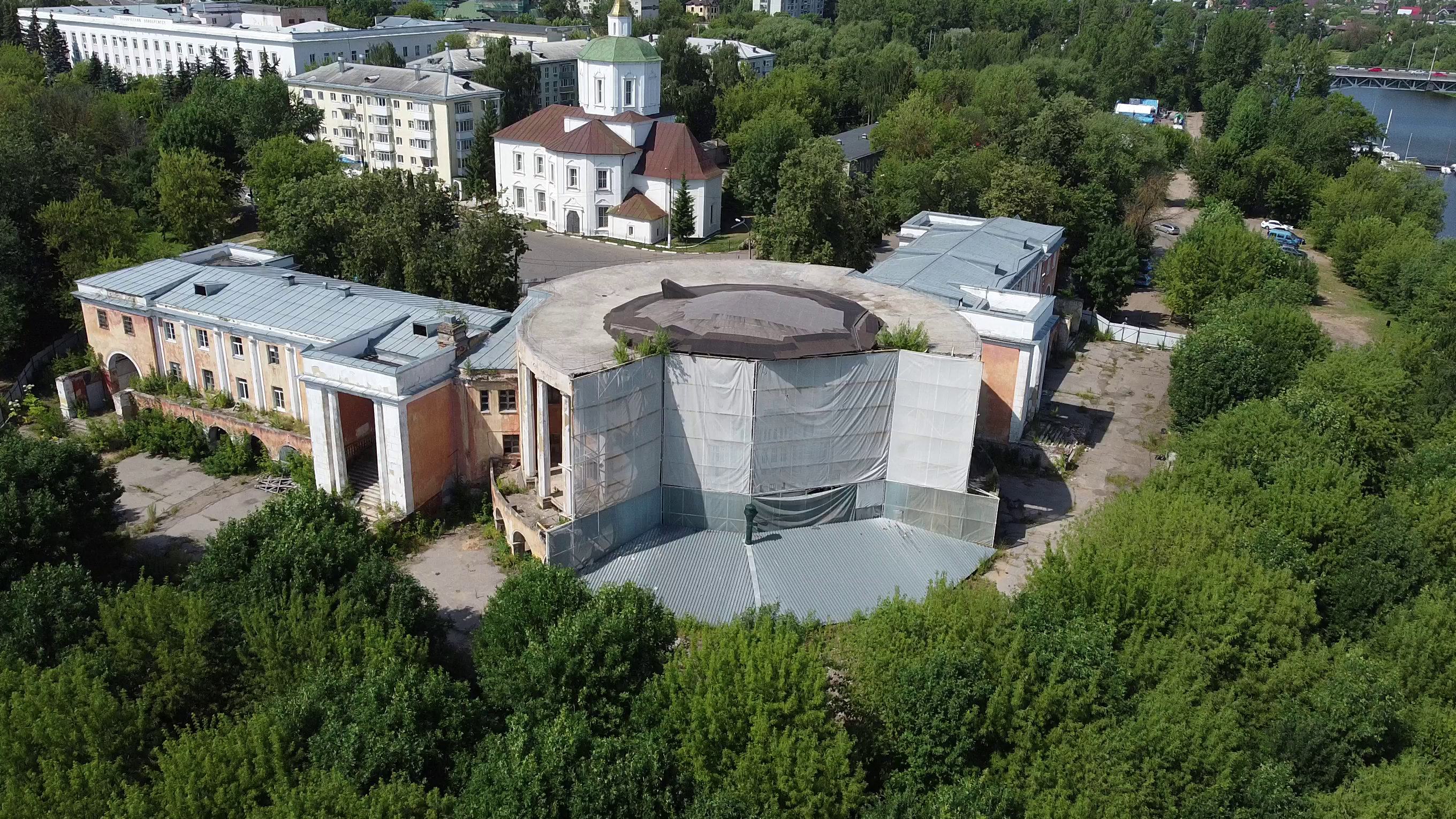

- Location within Russia

General information
- Status: Demolished
- Architectural style: Stalinist architecture
- Location: Afanasy Nikitin Embankment, 3, Tver, Russia
- Coordinates: 56°51′50″N 35°55′4″E
- Construction started: 1935
- Completed: 1938
- Destroyed: Partially collapsed: Aug 7, 2017. Demolished: Nov 19-23, 2025

Design and construction
- Architects: Gavrilova, Evgeniya Ivanovna; Rayskiy, P.

Tver River Terminal or Tverskoy rechnoy vokzal (Russian: Тверской речной вокзал) was a passenger terminal of river transport in Tver. It was situated at the confluence of the Volga and Tvertsa rivers, on the left bank of the Volga, just near the river mouth of Tvertsa.

The construction began in 1935, near the site of the demolished Otroch Uspensky Monastery, and was completed by 1938. Both architects and most of the workers on site were prisoners of the Volgolag labour camp (part of the Gulag).

Because of the compromises and corner-cutting made during the planning and construction, the building's structure began to decline by the end of 1980s. Due to the financial difficulties that city experienced in 1990s and early 2000s, local authorities were unable to afford proper repairs, which lead to further deterioration.

By that time, following the decline of water transport in the region, the river terminal building was out of the commission for almost a decade. In the following years, up until 2011, it was sometimes used as a venue for art expositions, while some of the sections were rented out to various tenants.

On the eve of August 7, 2017, main building began collapsing—a process that continued on the next day, eventually leading to the loss of external walls, floor structures and the roof.

On September 11, 2024 the building was excluded from the registry of objects of cultural heritage of the peoples of the Russian Federation, which made its demolition possible. Up until that point, the building remained untouched after the collapse, with no restoration work in progress.

On or around November 19, 2025 (according to different source, during the period from November 21 to November 23, 2025) the building of the river terminal was demolished using a single excavator. According to mass media communications, the activities of "demolition, planning and construction" are to be finished by some time in 2027.

== Events after the collapse ==
Immediately after the event, the governor of the Tver Oblast, Igor Rudenya announced that terminal's building will be restored in its historical form. However, no firm dates were announced with the regard to that statement.

On August 28, 2017, one of the regional media outlets has reported that local authorities knew that building was about to collapse for at least few months, as they've ordered an inspection on building's constructions, but ultimately decided to hold off with emergency repairs because of their cost.

By November 2017 most of the rubble from the collapse was cleared, and any unstable leftovers were forced down. The building itself was covered with decorative banner and fenced off from the pier and pedestrian walkways in order to protect the people from any random falling debris.

In April 2018 Aleksandra Smirnova, deputy head of Tver's regional chapter of the All-Russian Society for the Protection of Monuments of History and Culture has stated in the interview that budget of the Tver Oblast for 2018 has no money allocated for the emergency repairs or the reconstruction of the terminal.

On June 19, 2019, the chairman of Tver Duma (lower house of the regional parliament) Evgeny Pichuyev, answering the question about river terminal's fate, has stated that city has no funds for the restoration, and that it's necessary to find an investor who will be interested in funding the repairs.

On July 22, 2019, local authorities have announced that a complex engineering study will be undertaken in order to develop suggestions and instructions on the restoration procedure. However, it was also stated that no hard decision on the building's fate will be made until the study is complete: should the engineers decide that there's an irreparable damage, the building most likely will be demolished rather than restored. In accordance with the contract for the study, its results should be delivered to the authorities no later than December 20, 2019. As of December 26, 2019, those were not made publicly available.

On December 11, 2019, the governor of the Tver Oblast, Igor Rudenya stated in the interview that it is planned to construct a brand-new building for the river terminal instead of restoring a historical one, employing "new technologies". Rudenya announced that 800 million rubles are already secured to fund the construction. In the same interview he also stated that there are plans to partially restore an Otroch Uspensky Monastery building complex along with the terminal's construction (it is widely believed that the former was occupying the same spot as the river terminal, just before it got demolished in the early 1930s). Governor has failed to mention how local authorities will go around the federal law which strictly prohibits to demolish any buildings which were declared as objects of cultural heritage of the peoples of the Russian Federation.

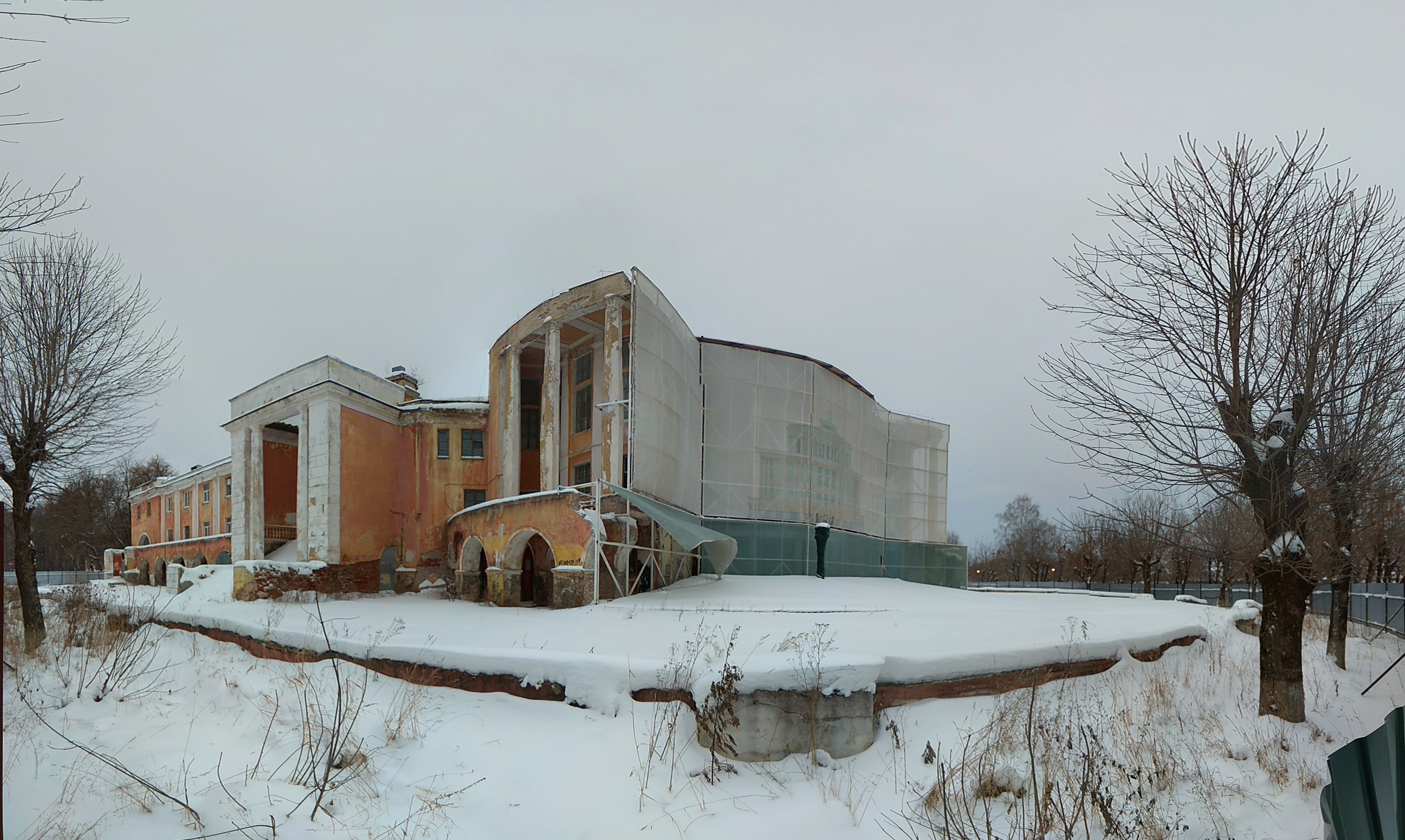
Panoramic view of the Tver River Terminal's building (January 12, 201

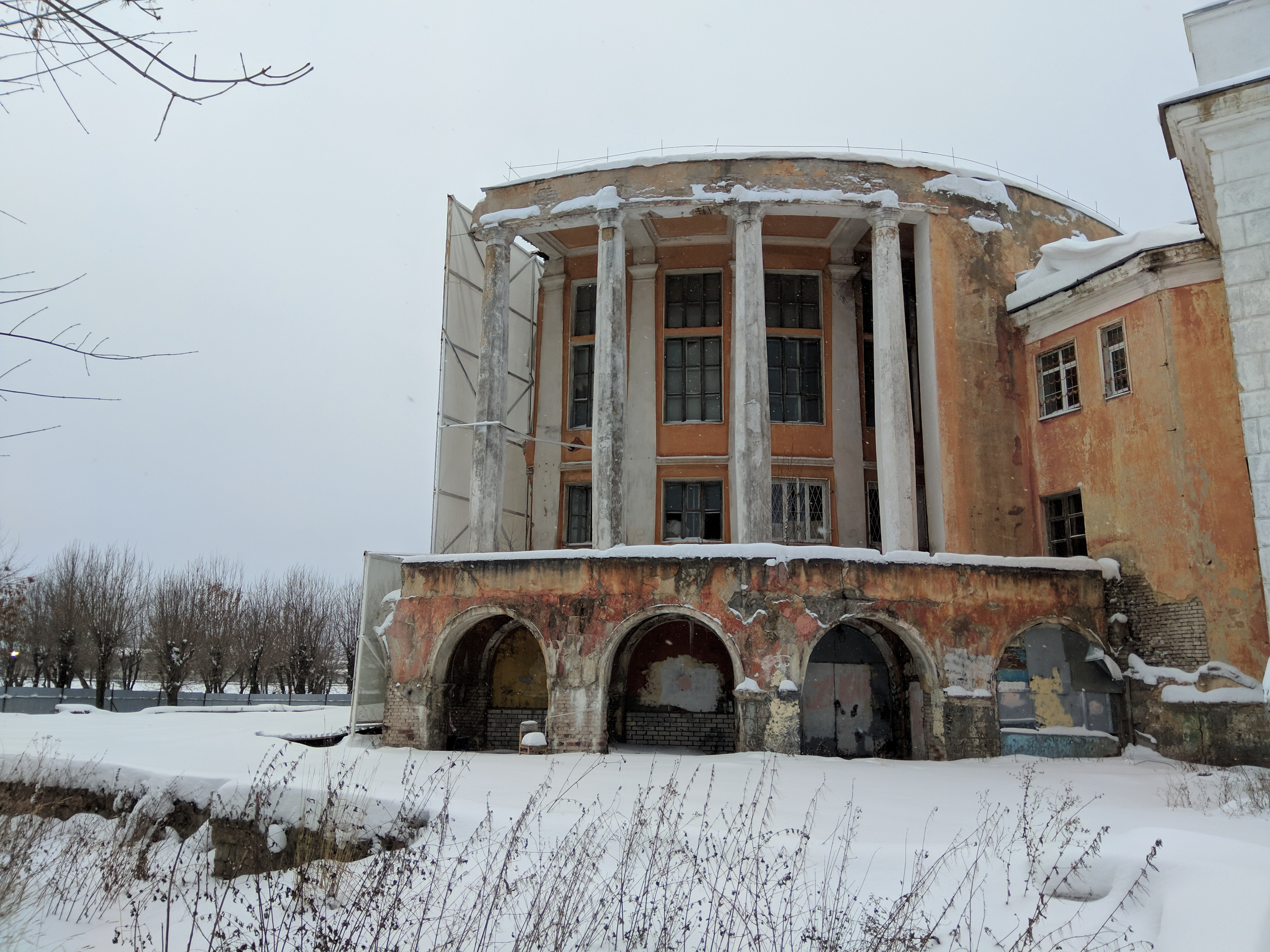

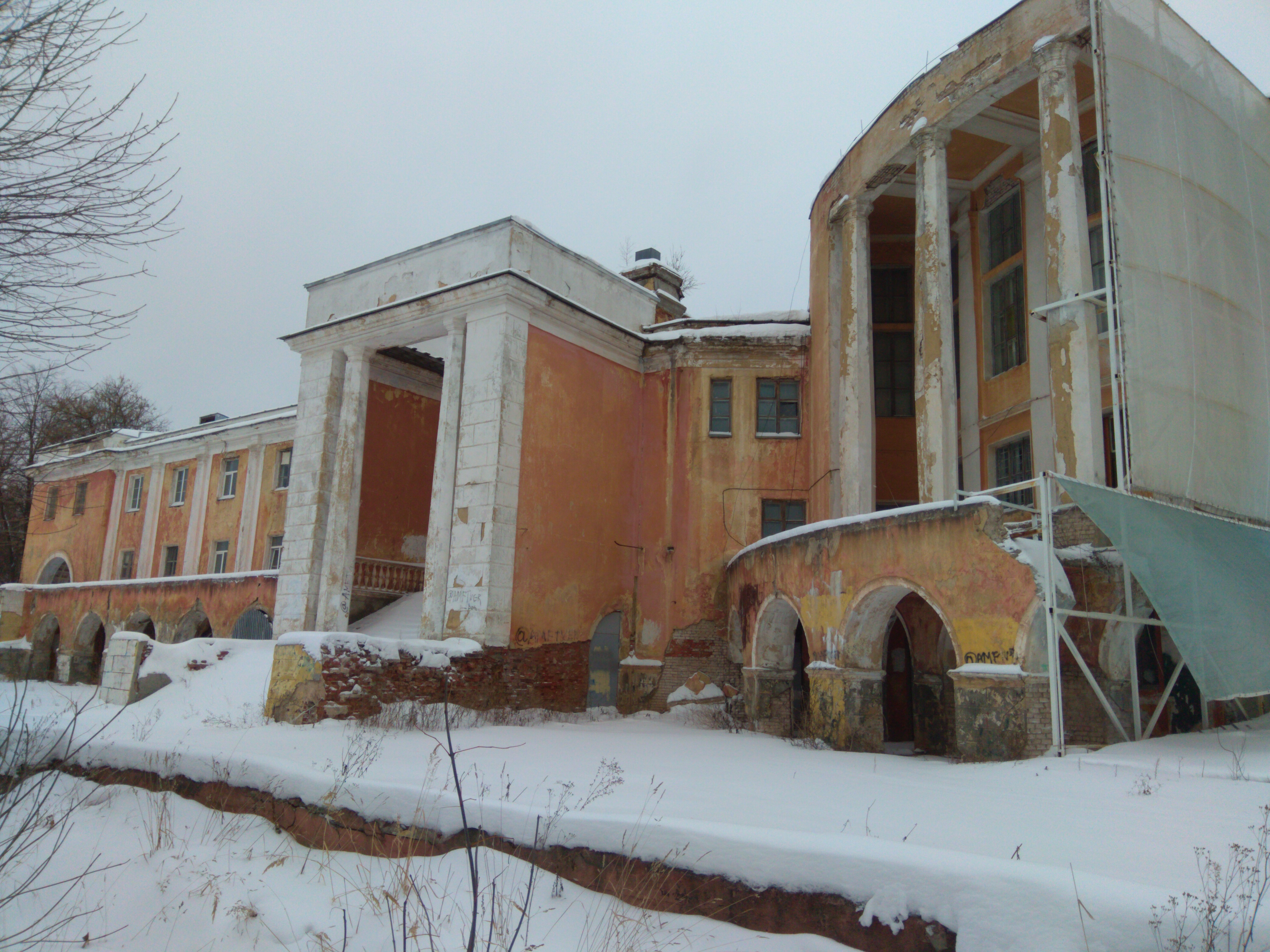

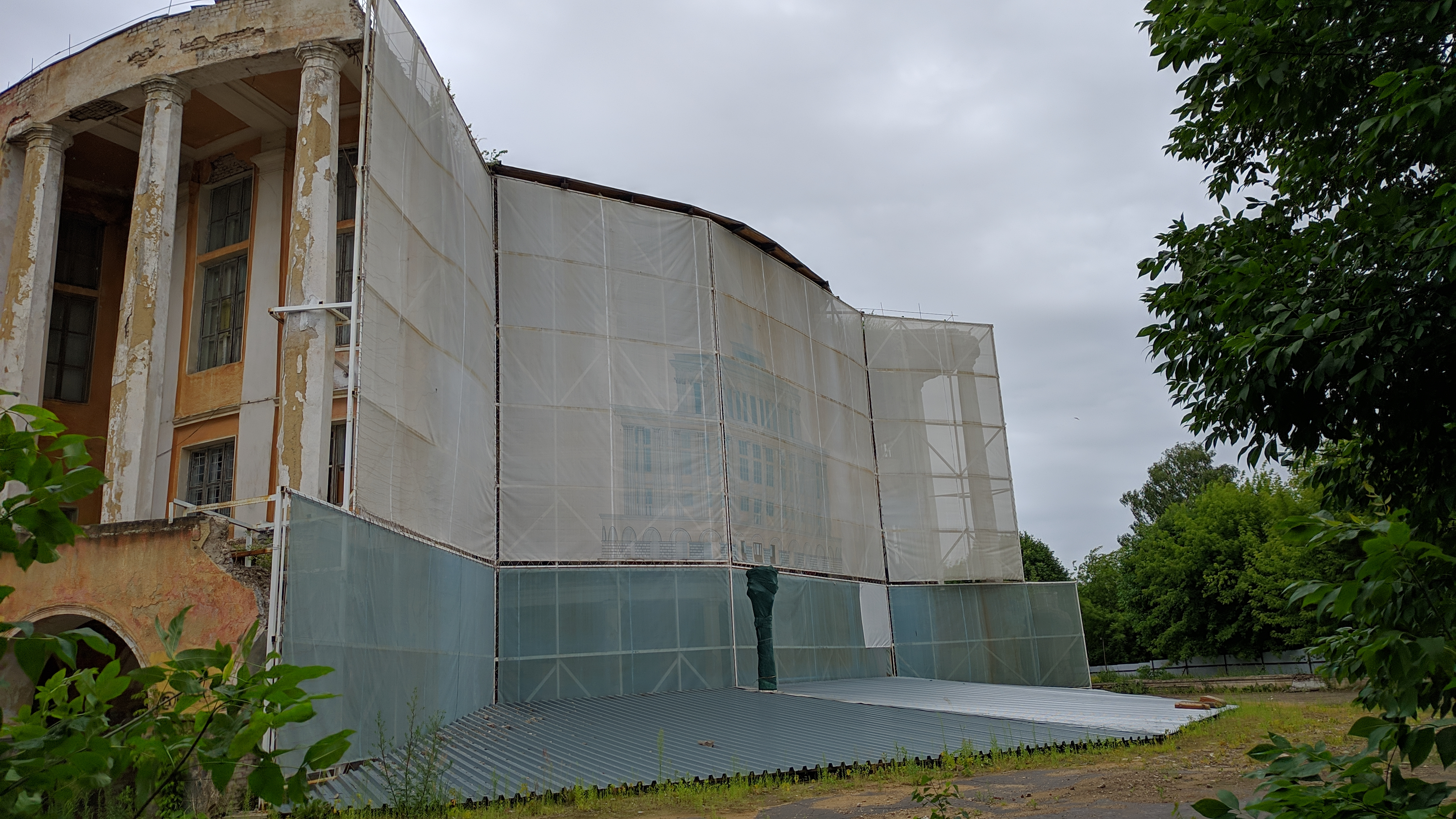
The south side of the rotunda of the Tver River Terminal (June 29, 2019)

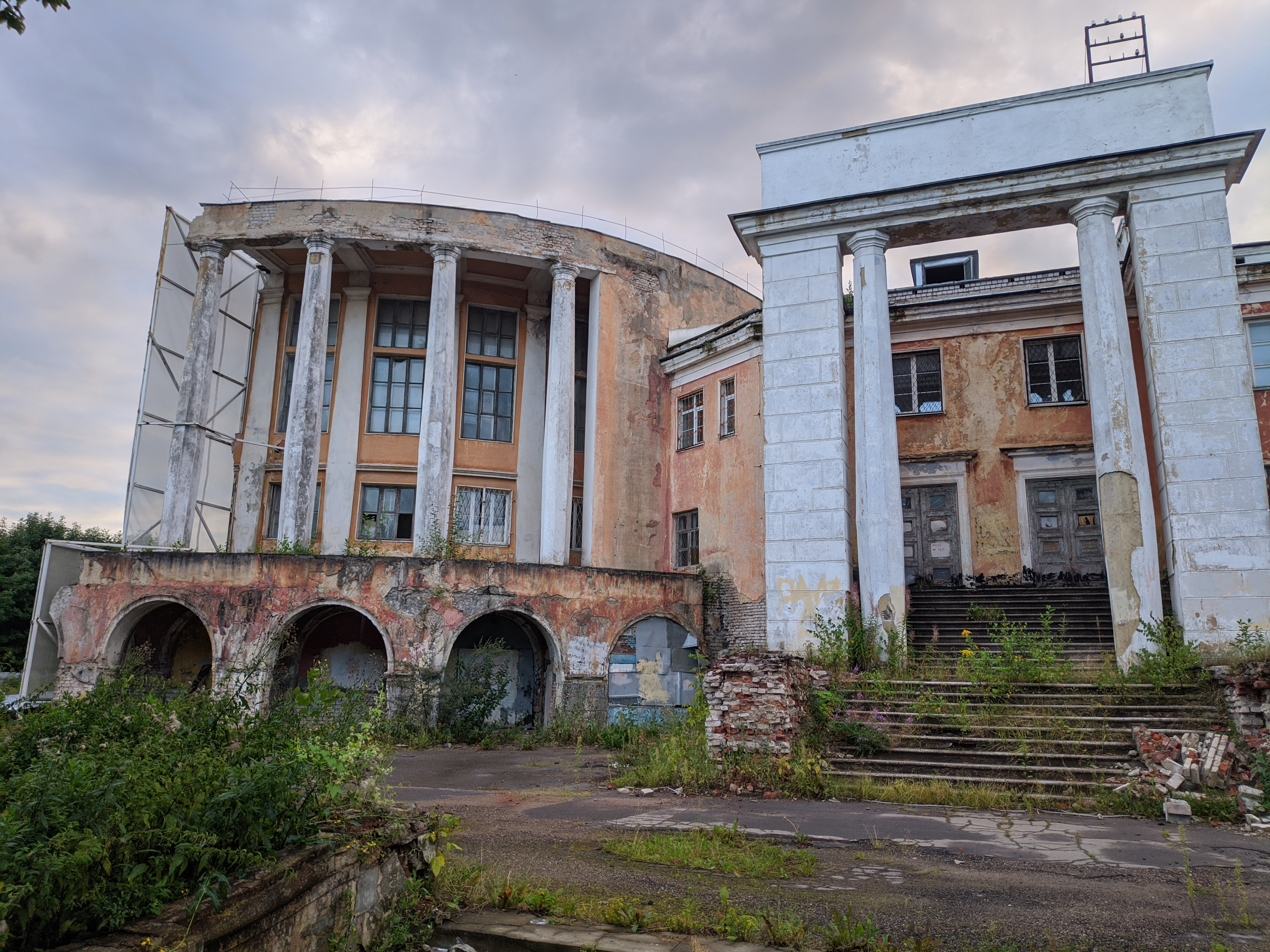
The north-eastern side of the rotunda of the Tver River Terminal, (August 16, 2020)

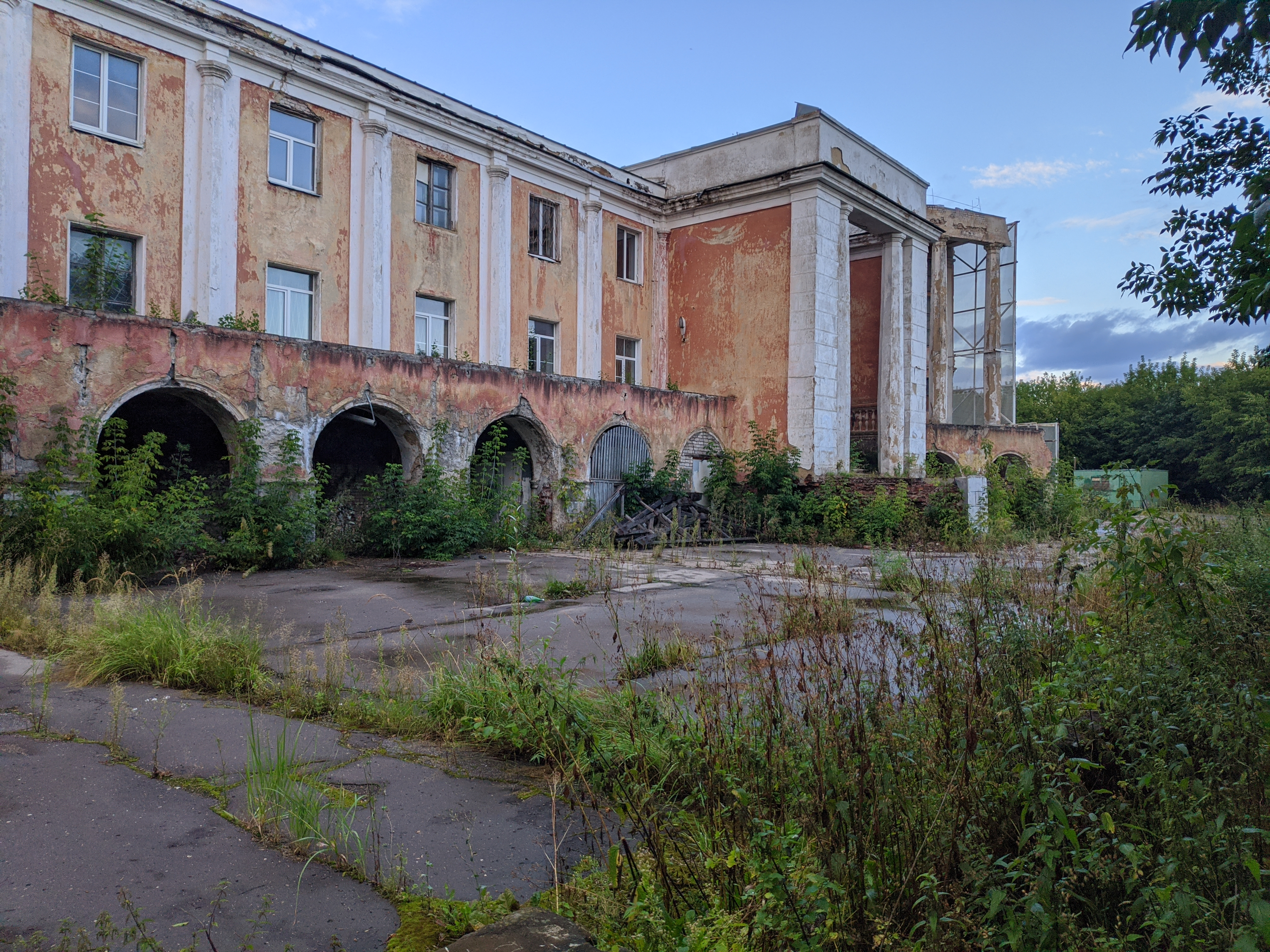

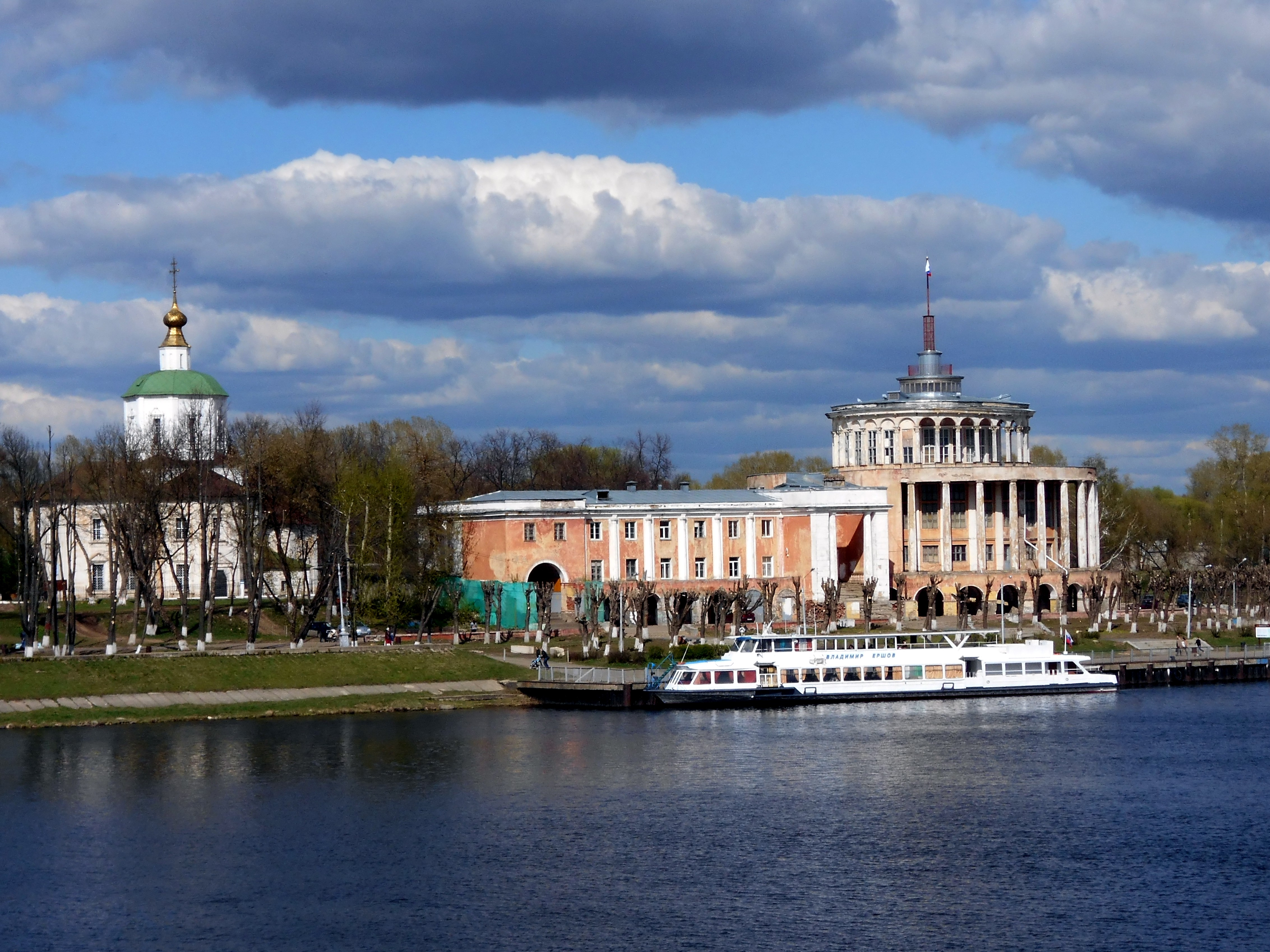
View from the Volga

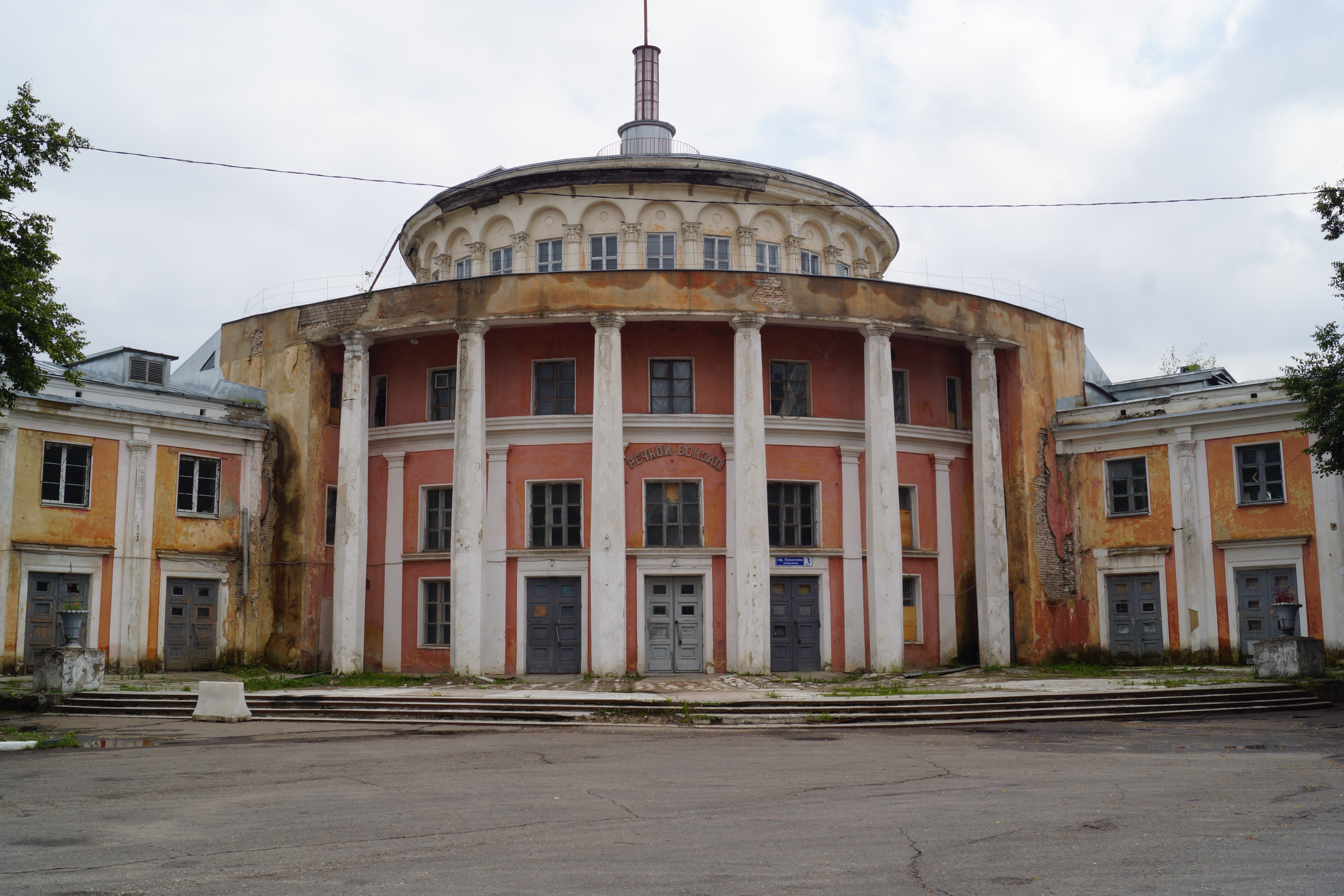
