= Kryukov =

Kryukov (Russian: Крю́ков) and Kryukova (Russian: Крю́кова; feminine) is a common Russian surname derived from the word "крюк" (kryuk). While the literal meaning of the word is "hook", the surname stems from the figurative meaning of "finicky person", a "quibbler", but also a "stoop-shouldered person".

People with this surname include:

- Andrei Krukov (born 1971), Kazakh and Azerbaijani skater
- Artem Kryukov (born 1982), Russian ice hockey player
- Fyodor Kryukov (1870–1920), Russian writer and soldier
- Irina Kryukova (born 1968), Russian women chess grandmaster
- Mikhail Kryukov (1932–2024), Soviet and Russian anthropologist and historian
- Nikolai Kryukov (gymnast) (born 1978), Russian artistic gymnast
- Nikolai Kryukov (actor) (1915–1993), Soviet film and theater actor
- Nikolai Kryukov (composer) (1908–1961), Russian composer
- Nikita Kryukov (born 1985), Russian former cross-country skier
- Vladimir Kryukov (general) (1897–1959), Soviet Army general
- Vladimir Kryukov (rower) (1925–2005), Russian rower and aerospace engineer
- Yevgeni Kryukov (1963–2024), Soviet and Russian footballer and coach

== See also ==
- 32734 Kryukov
- Kryuchkov
- Kryukov, name of several rural localities in Russia
