= Kryuchkovo air base =

Kryuchkovo
- IATA: none; ICAO: ZA6J

Summary
- Airport type: Military
- Location: Tver
- Elevation AMSL: 0 ft / 0 m
- Coordinates: 57°4′6″N 035°30′30″E
- Interactive map of Kryuchkovo

Runways
Direction	Length		Surface
Direction	ft	m	Surface
	6,562	2,000

Kryuchkovo (Крюк- "Hook") was a Soviet military airbase in Tver Oblast, Russia, located 34 km northwest of Tver. Shown on the 1973 Department of Defense Global Navigation Chart No. 1, it was probably a 1950 Cold War airfield. Very little remains and its exact location is uncertain.
