= Tver Garment Factory =

Textile factory in Tver, Russia

Coordinates: 56°50′45″N 35°54′48.4″E

- Headquarters: Pobedy av., 14, Tver, Russia
- Number of employees: 300 (July 2016)
- Website: TVSF.com

Tver Garment Factory is a clothing industry facility in Tver.

Established in 1918 as "Gubodezhda" factory, since that moment repeatedly changed its name:

- since 1923 — "Tverodezhda" factory
- since 1927 — garment factory "Moscvoshvey" No. 11
- since 1930 (after moving to new building) — garment factory "Moscvoshvey" No. 11
- since 1946 — Knitwear Factory
- since 1950s — factory No. 1
- in 1962 merged with Kalinin garment factory No. 2
- since 1975 under its modern name.

Fall 1941 partly evacuated to Tomsk, and many employees was sent to the front. Building and remaining supplies was hardly damaged during town occupation in October - December 1941. In 1942 was partly recovered and until 1945 was manufacturing military equipment. In 1946 there was installed German equipment, in 1950s was built new building, in 1960 established own newspaper and cultural institutions, in 1970s — fitted with a new equipment.

Tver garment factory produces men's suits under brand "Kavalier".

== Directors ==
CEO - Gumenyuk Rafilya Ravilyevna
