= Olga Kryuchkova =

Russian author (born 1966)

Olga Evgenevna Kryuchkova
- Born: August 7, 1966 (age 60); Moscow, Russian SFSR, Soviet Union
- Occupation: Writer
- Writing career
- Genres: Historical, Mystical, Adventure
- Website: author-oekryuchkova.narod.ru/sait_2/index.html

Olga Evgenevna Kryuchkova (Russian: Ольга Евгеньевна Крючкова), pseudonym Olivia Claymore (Russian: Оливия Клеймор) (born 7 August 1966), a Russian historical and mystical writer. To date, Kryuchkova is the author of 25 novels and published by "Veche" (Russian: "Вече").

== Biography ==
Olga Kryuchkov was born in Moscow on 7 August 1966. After graduating high school in 1983, she entered the Moscow College of automation and remote specialty mathematician and programmer, who graduated with honors and got a job working for one of the Moscow Aviation Institute.

In 1986 she enrolled in the Moscow Aviation Institute the faculty of aircraft. Institute and graduated in 1992. Her literary career began in 2006. Her first novel, "Captain Marauder" was published in the journal publishers «Feat-Centaur» in" historical bestseller "(2007). Then, in the same year 2007, came love-historical novel "Family Cross" publisher "Geleos" in series "Lace Love".

In 2008, she published six novels, the writer (one published under a pseudonym). In January 2008, her novel "Adventurers," publisher "Feat-Centaur". The publishing house "Geleos" came out four publications: "The gift of Aphrodite", "Happy choice", "Riddles of Fate" and under the pseudonym of Olivia Claymore her novel "The French Messalina". In the same year the author was first published in publishing house "Veche": a book under the title "Captain Marauder" includes two novels - "Captain Marauder" and "Demon Montsegur".

In 2009 came another four novels: "Adventurers", "Rose of Versailles", "Return of Captain Marauder" and "Heirs of the country of Yamato". All four novels were published by the publishing house "Veche"

== Book ==
Published works and e-books.

- Russian adventure novel. Russia, 19th century:
  - "Adventurers" ("Авантюристы"), 2009, 2013
  - "Rose of Versailles" ("Роза Версаля"), 2009
  - "Armor of Dracula" ("Доспехи Дракулы"), 2010
  - "Family Cross" ("Фамильный крест"), 2007
  - "The Gift of Aphrodite" ("Дары Афродиты"), 2008
  - "Riddles of Fate" ("Загадки Судьбы"), 2008
  - "Happy Choice" ("Счастливый выбор"), 2008
  - "Duelist" ("Дуэлянты"), 2011
  - "Emerald summer" ("Изумрудное лето"), 2011
- Historical adventure. The Middle Ages, the ancient times:
  - "Captain Marauder" ("Капитан мародёров"), 2007, 2008, 2011, 2016
  - "The Return of Captain Marauder" ("Возвращение капитана мародёров"), 2009, 2011
  - "Captain of marauders. Heavenly Zion" ("Капитан Мародёров. Небесный Сион"), 2011
  - "Demon Montsegur" ("Демон Монсегюра"), 2008, 2016
  - "Heirs of the country of Yamato" ("Наследники страны Ямато"), 2009, 2016
  - "Blood and the Cross" ("Кровь и крест"), 2010
  - "The Ark of Power" ("Ковчег могущества"), 2010, 2016
  - "King of Austrasia" ("Король Австразии"), 2011
  - "Nibelung. Dragon's blood" ("Нибелунги. Кровь Дракона"), 2011, 2015
- Mystic:
  - "City of the Gods" ("Город богов"), 2011, 2014
  - "Holy Hills" ("Священные холмы"), 2011, 2014
  - "The Prelate" ("Прелат"), 2011
  - "The servant of Lucifer" ("Слуга Люцифера"), 2011, 2017
- Love historical novel:
  - "The Lady of the heart" ("Дама Сердца")("Dark knight"("Черный рыцарь")), 2011, 2016
  - "History of the Purple Lady" ("История Пурпурной Дамы"), 2011, 2016
  - "Lady-in-waiting of Jade lady" ("Фрейлина нефритовой госпожи"), 2016
- Slavic Fantasy:
  - "Children of Irii. Ladomira" ("Дети Ирия. Ладомира"), 2016
  - "Children of Irii. Mecheslav" ("Дети Ирия. Мечеслав"), 2016

=== Published under the pseudonym Olivia Claymore ===
- Love historical novel:
  - "The French Messalina" ("Французская Мессалина"), 2008
