= Reznichenko =

Reznichenko (Ukrainian: Резніченко; Russian: Резниченко) is a Ukrainian surname. Notable people with the surname include:

- Ihor Reznichenko (born 1994), Ukrainian figure skater
- Nikolai Reznichenko (1952–2021), Russian military officer
- Valentyn Reznichenko (born 1972), Ukrainian politician
- Wladimir Resnitschenko (born 1965), Soviet-born German fencer

== See also ==
- Reznichenko House
