= Pushkinskaya Street (Rostov-on-Don) =

Street in Rostov-on-Don, Russia

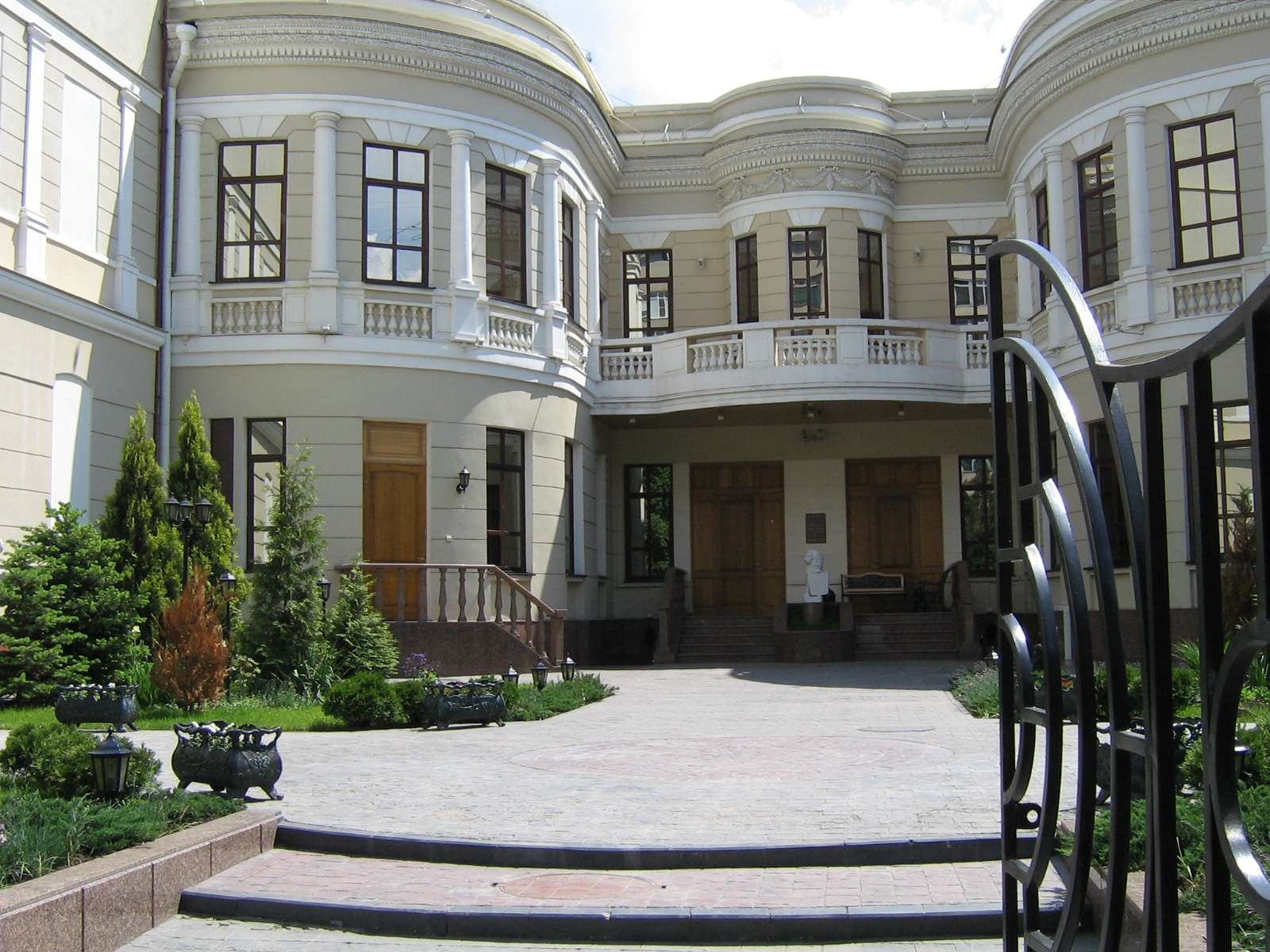
- The Mansion of Pavel Kramer on Pushkinskaya Street
- Interactive map of Pushkinskaya Street
- Native name: Пушкинская улица (Russian)
- Length: 3.45 km (2.14 mi)
- Location: Rostov-on-Don, Russia
- Coordinates: 47°13′20″N 39°42′3″E

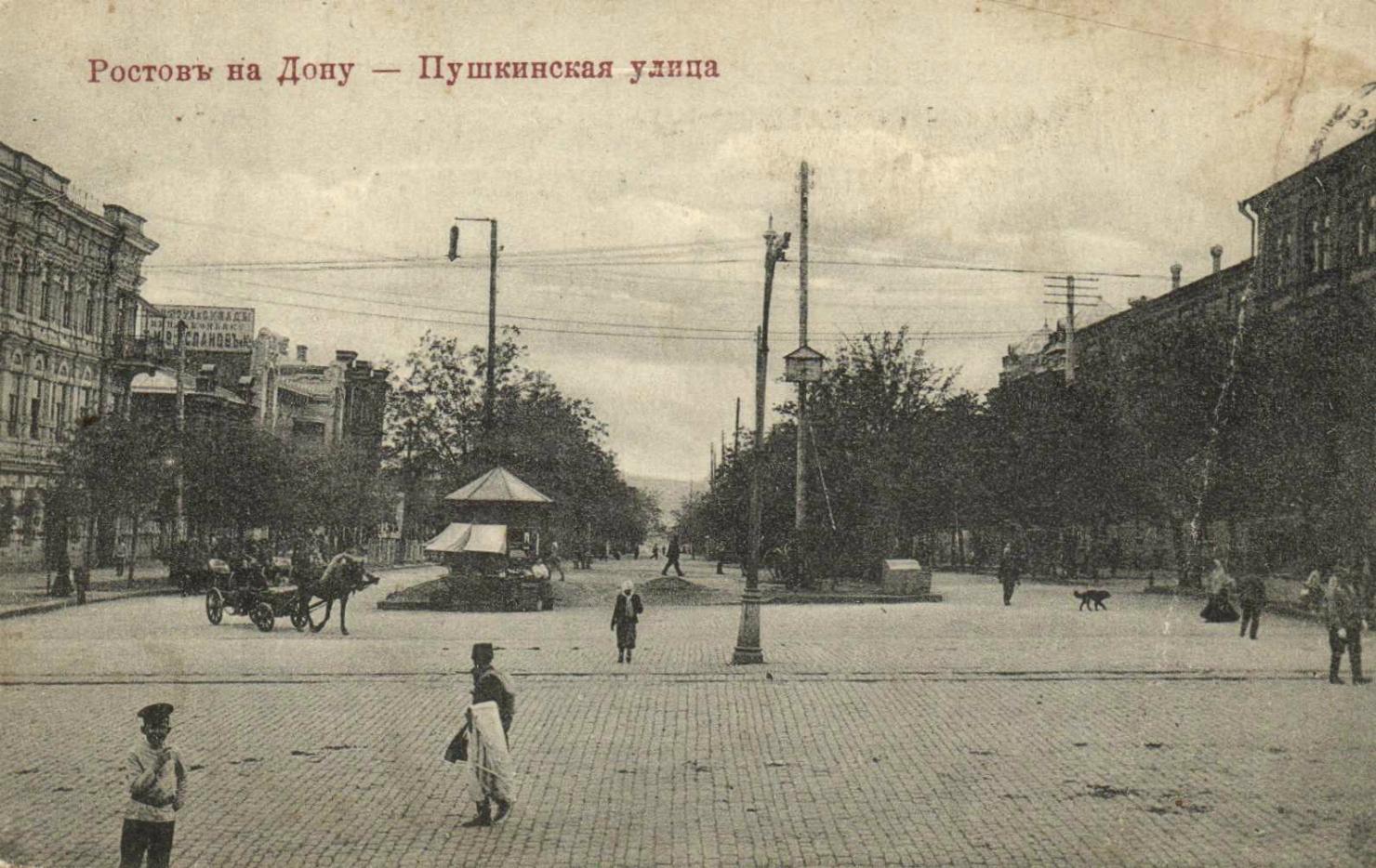
Pushkinskaya street in the late 19th — early 20th century

Pushkinskaya Street (Russian: Пушкинская улица) is one of the main streets in Rostov-on-Don. The street is named after the Russian poet Alexander Pushkin. Many old houses, university buildings, and the Don State Public Library are located on this street. The Pushkinskaya Street is a green boulevard, it goes parallel to the Don River.

== History ==
The street was constructed in the second half of the 19th century and was originally named Kuznetskaya (Blacksmith). In 1885, it was named Pushkinskaya in honor of the great Russian poet Alexander Pushkin, who visited Rostov-on-Don several times.

At the beginning of the 20th century Pushkinskaya Street became the second most important after the Bolshaya Sadovaya Street. In 1904 electric streetlights appeared on the street. The houses on the street were built by the best architects of the city.

In 1959 the Monument to Alexander Pushkin was erected on the street.

== Notable buildings and structures ==
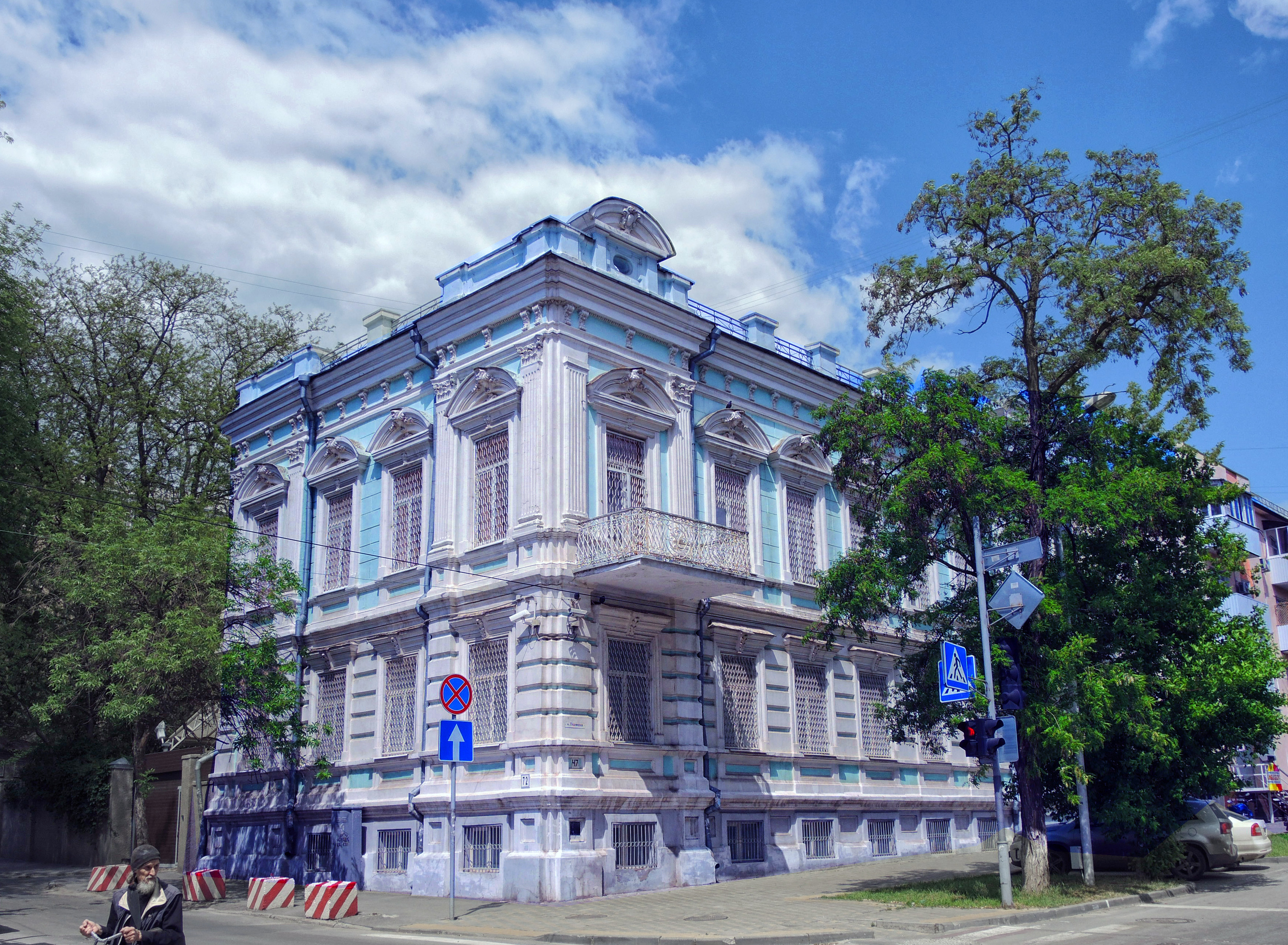
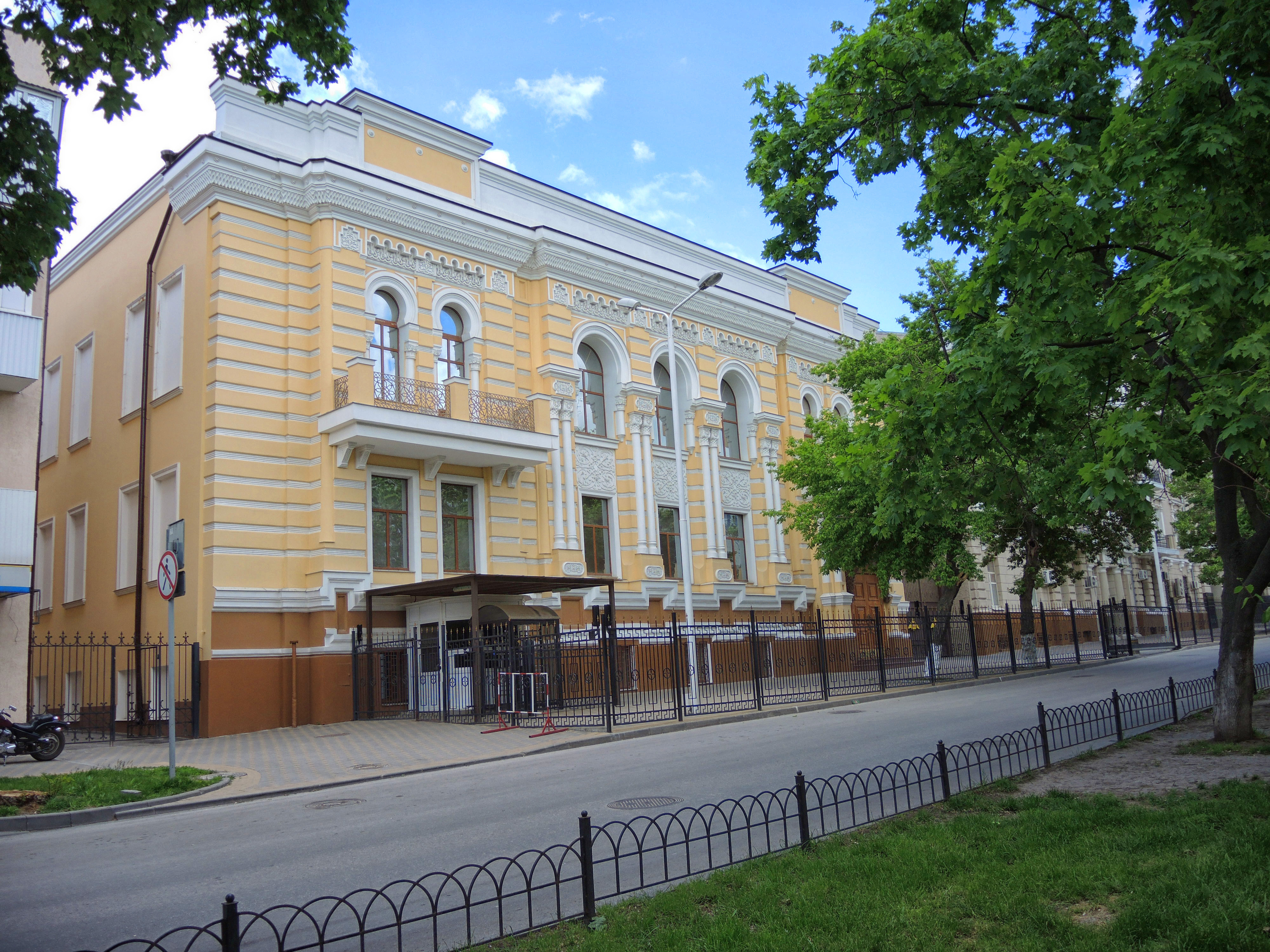
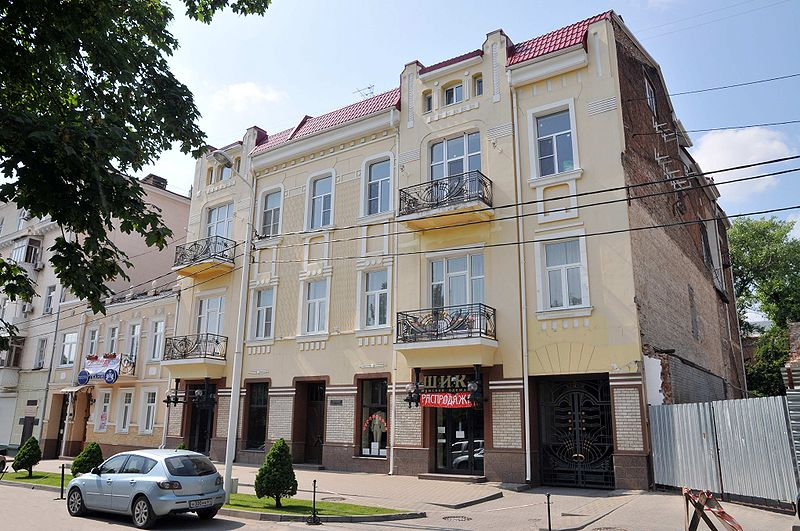
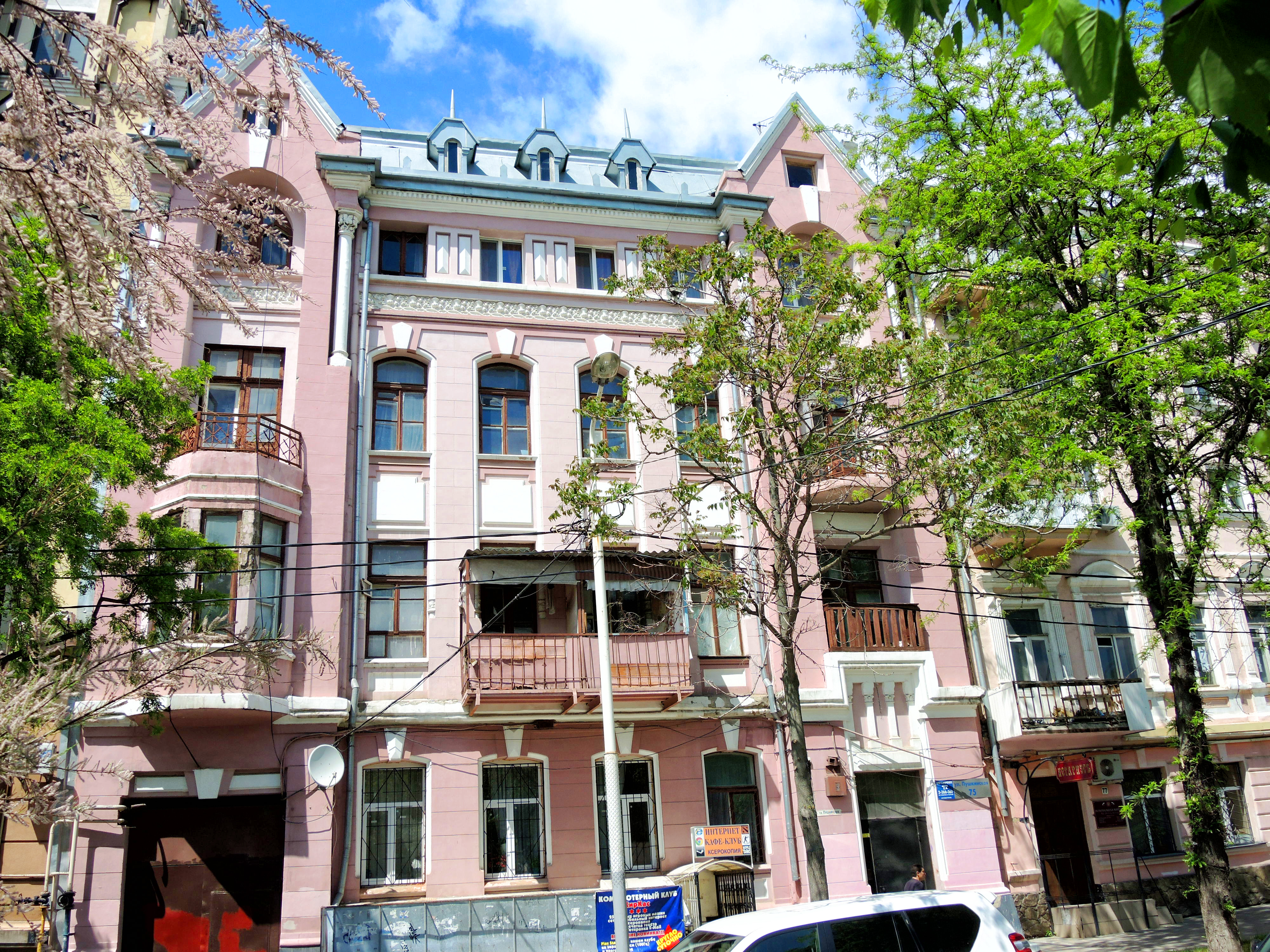
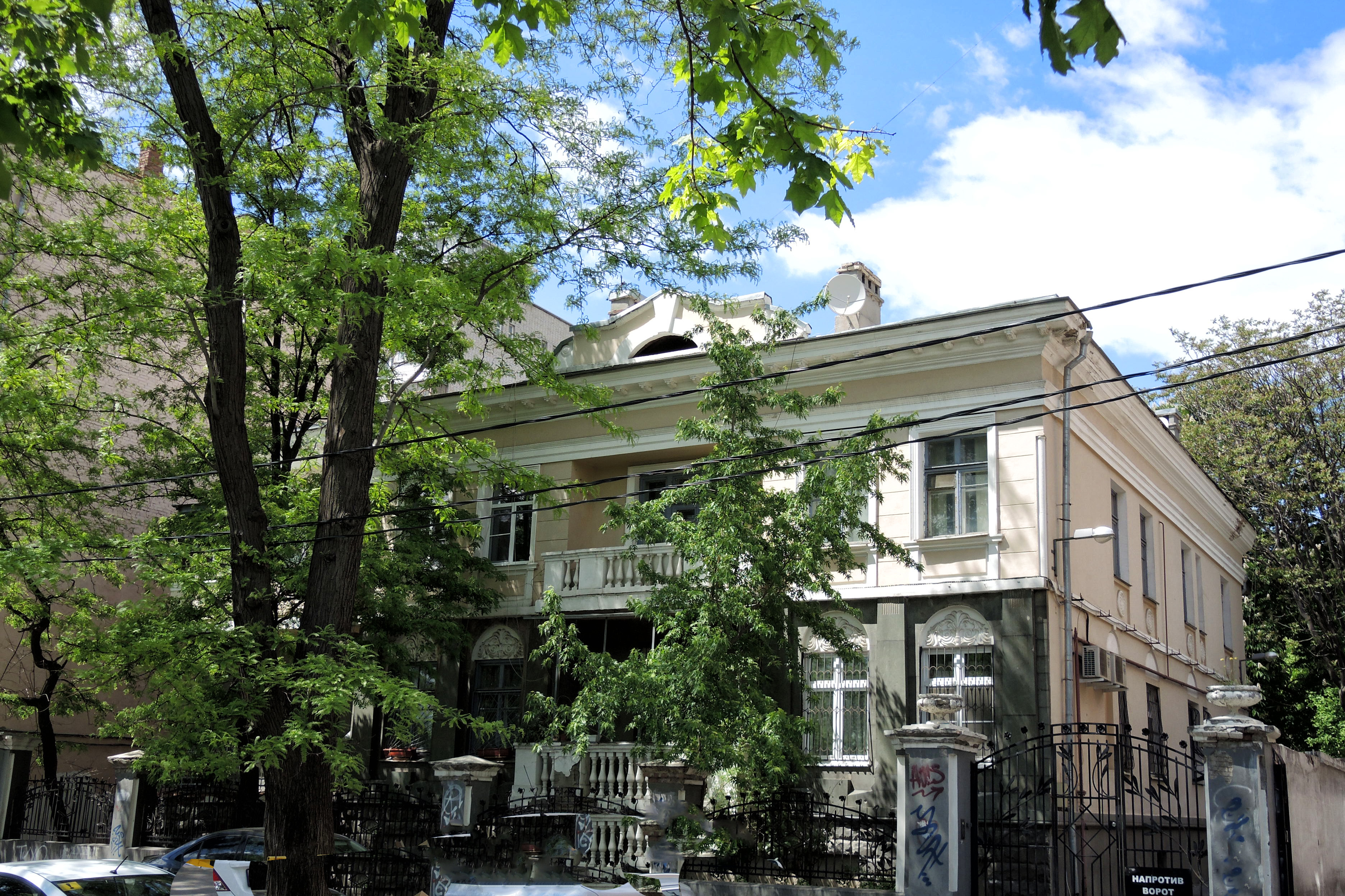
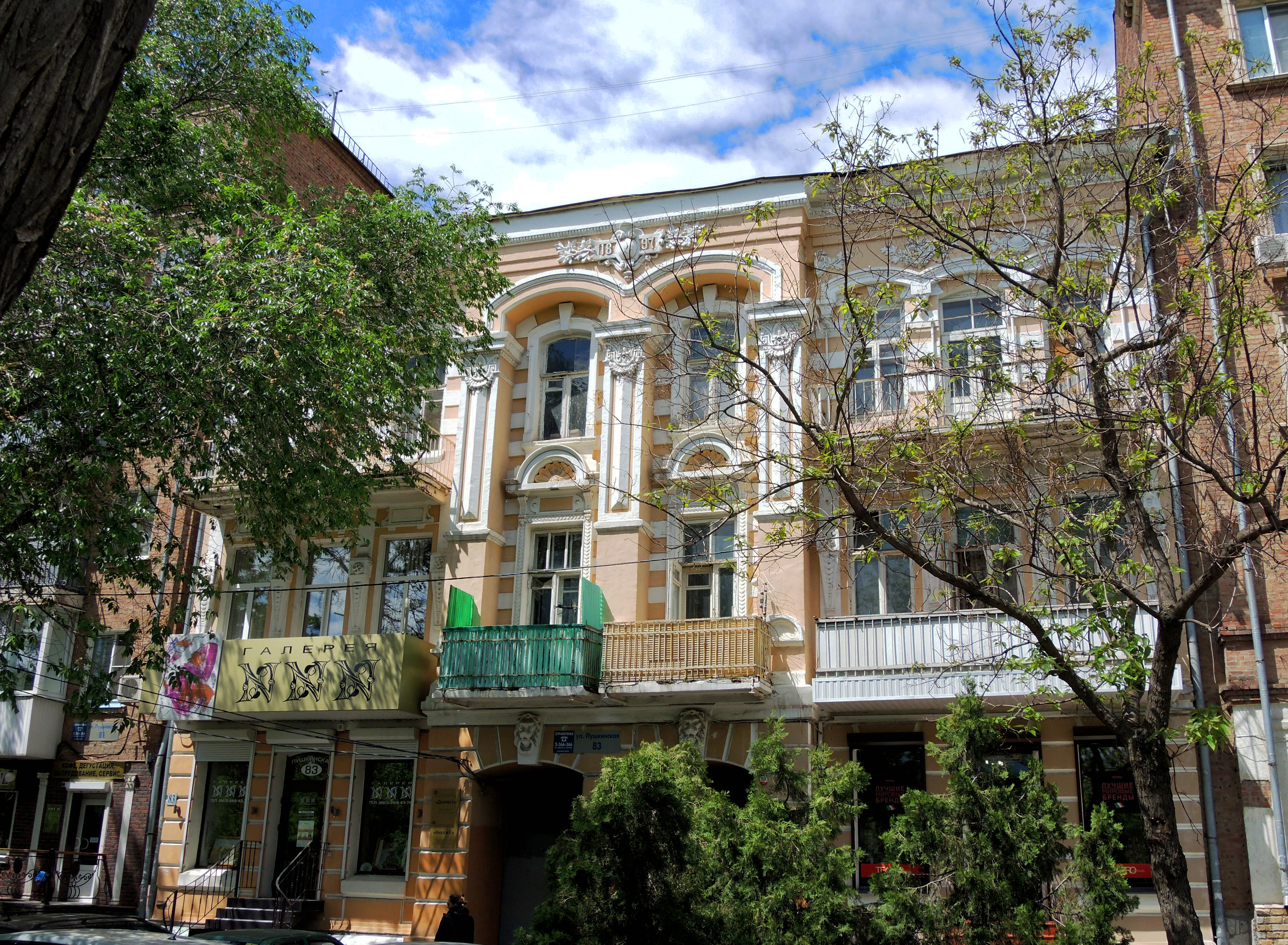
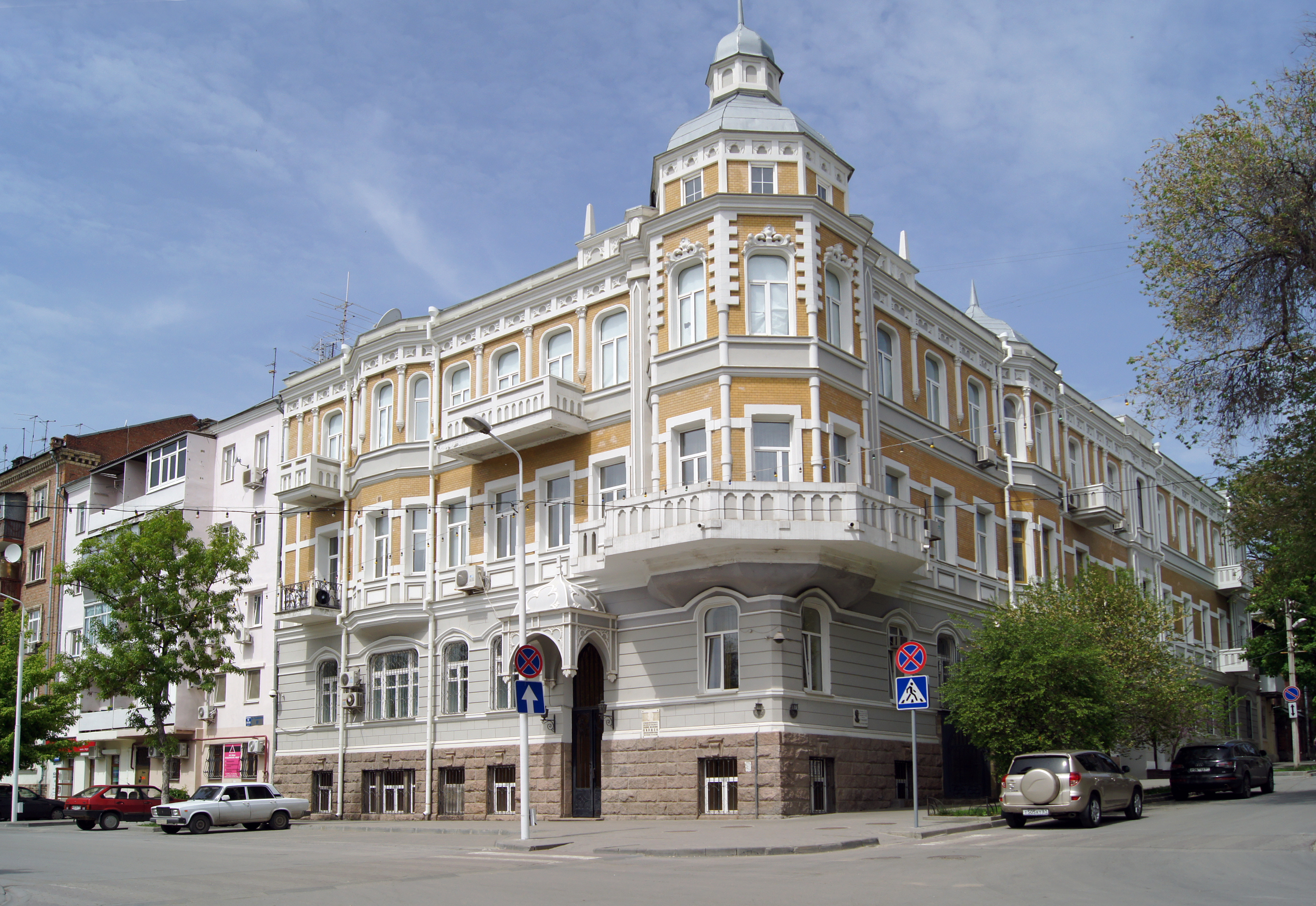
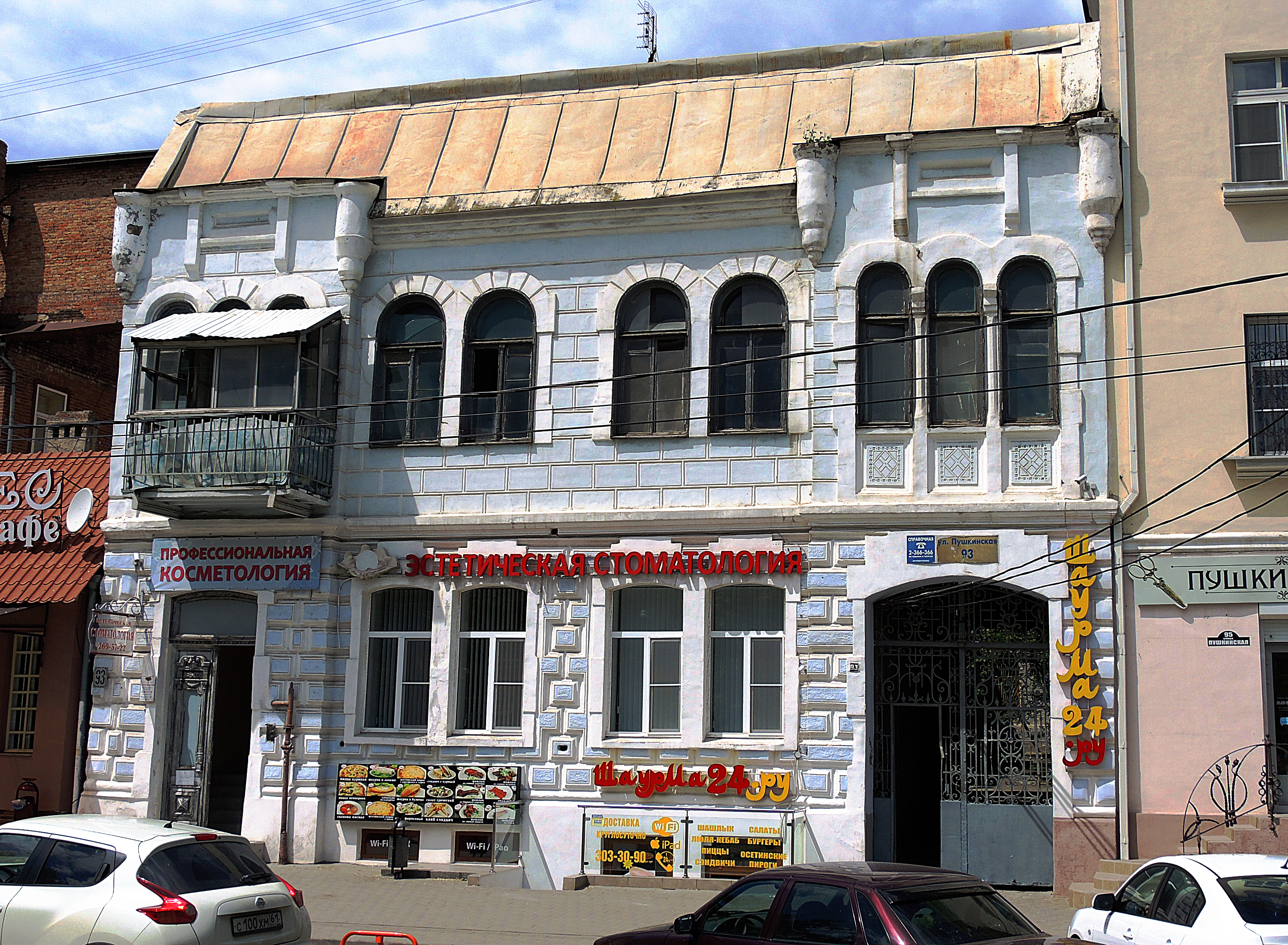
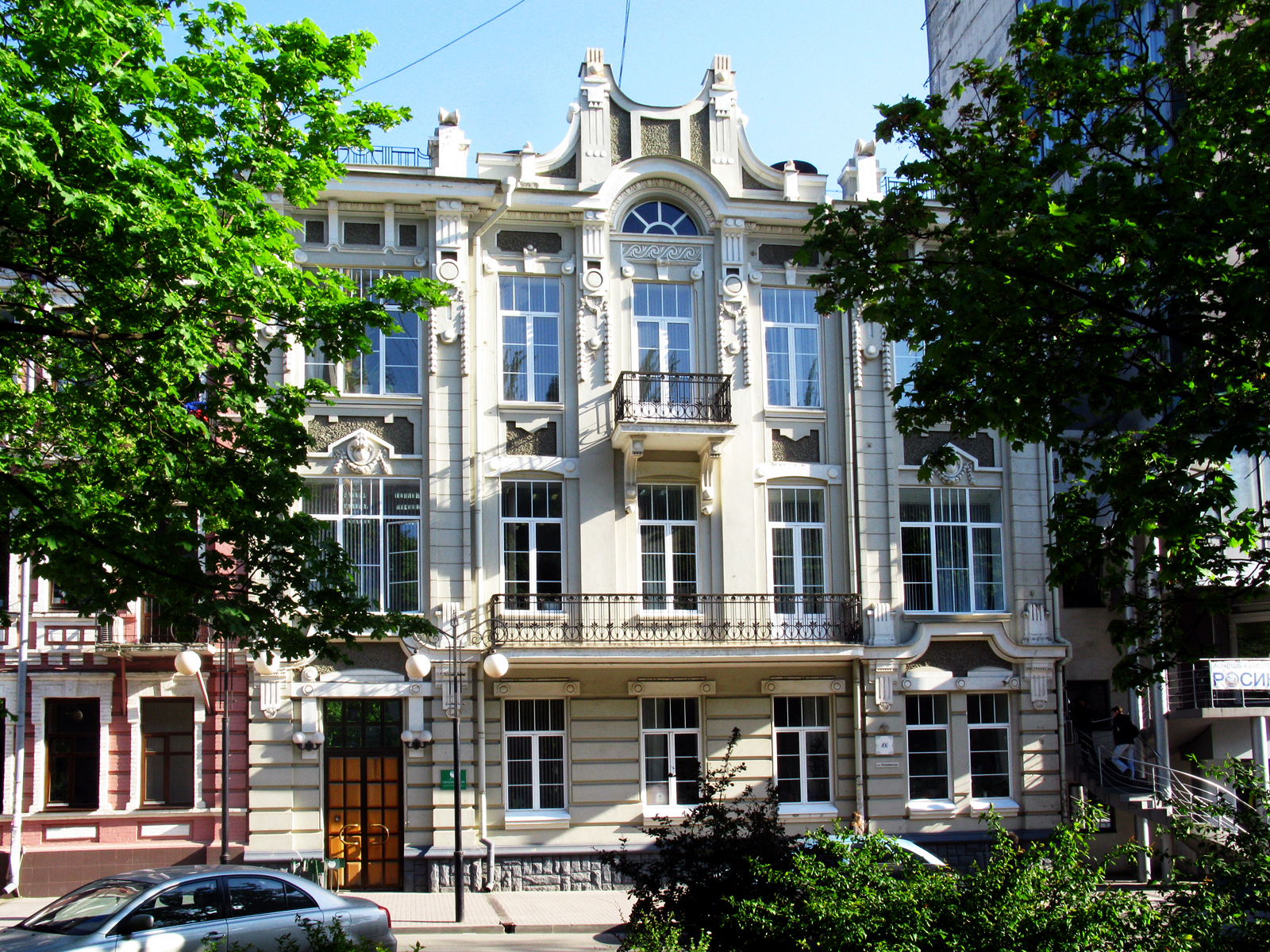
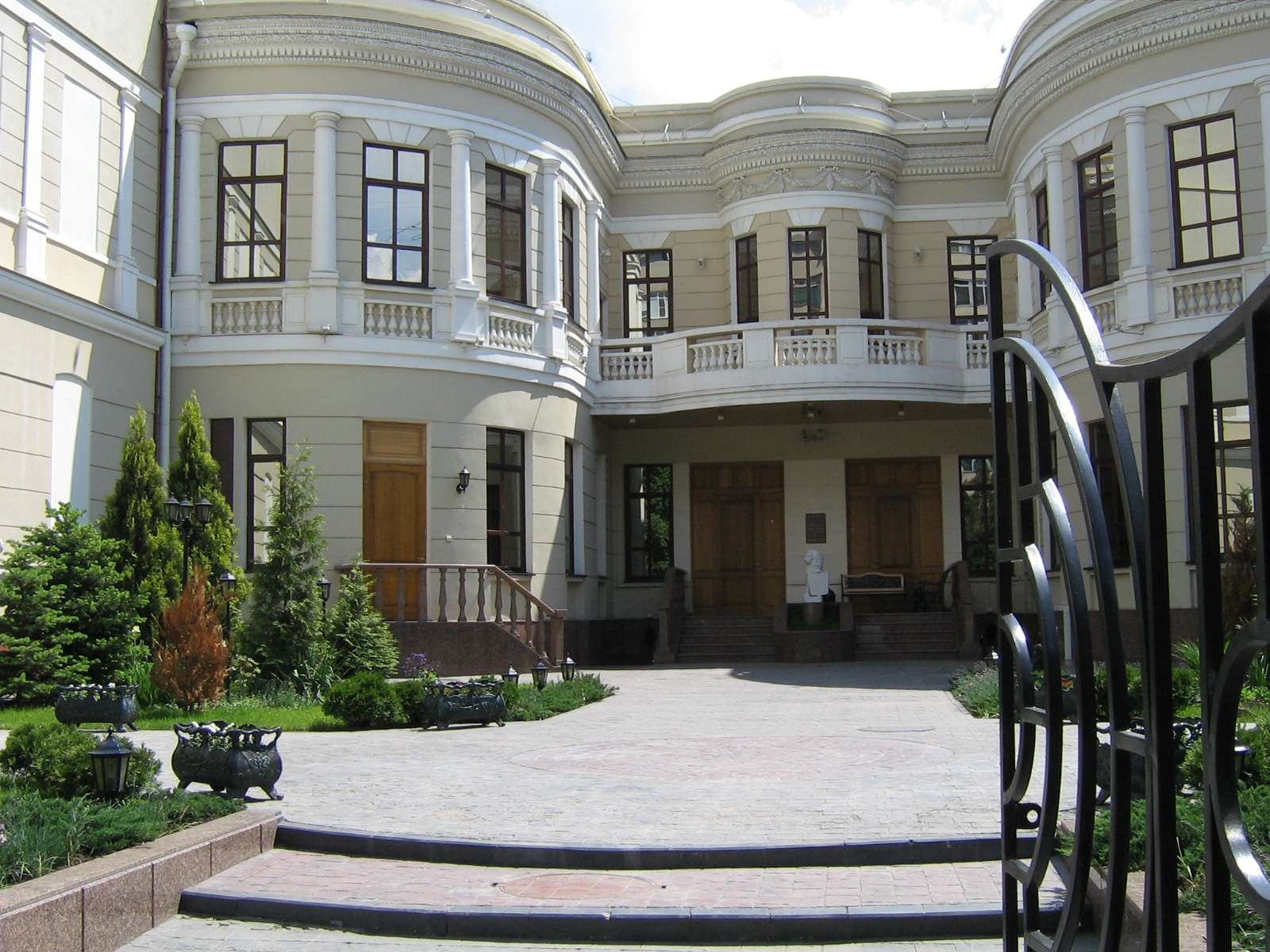
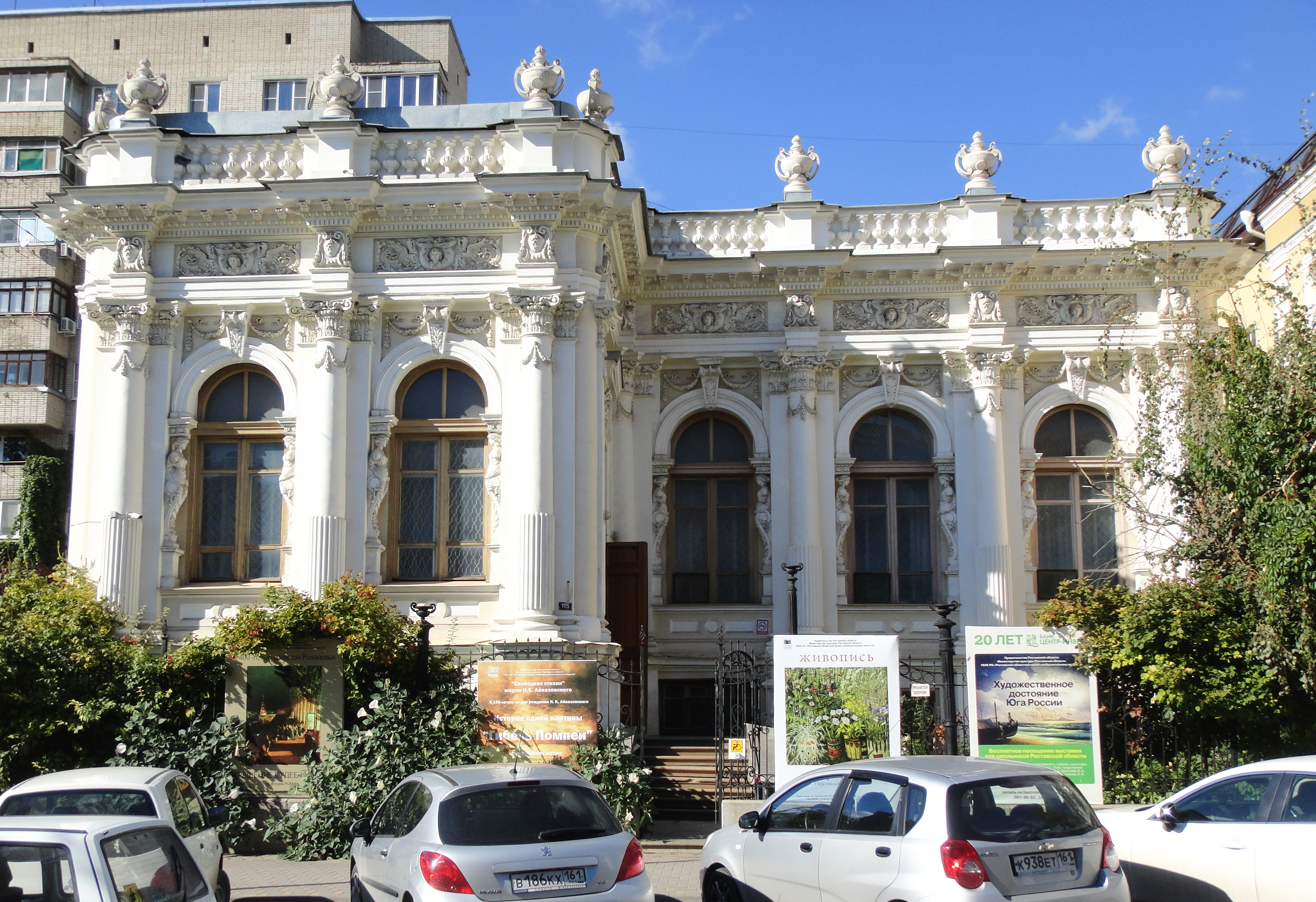
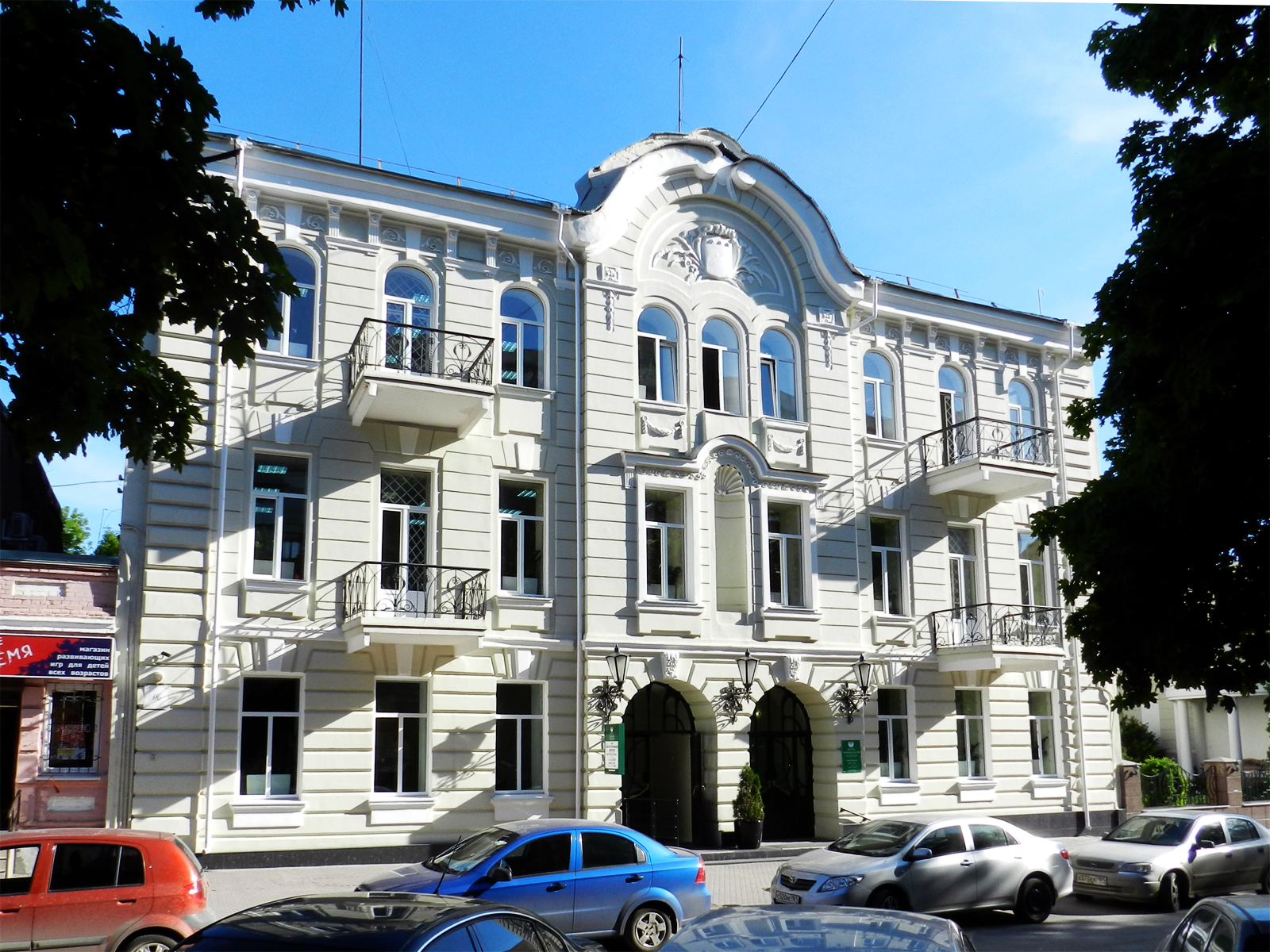
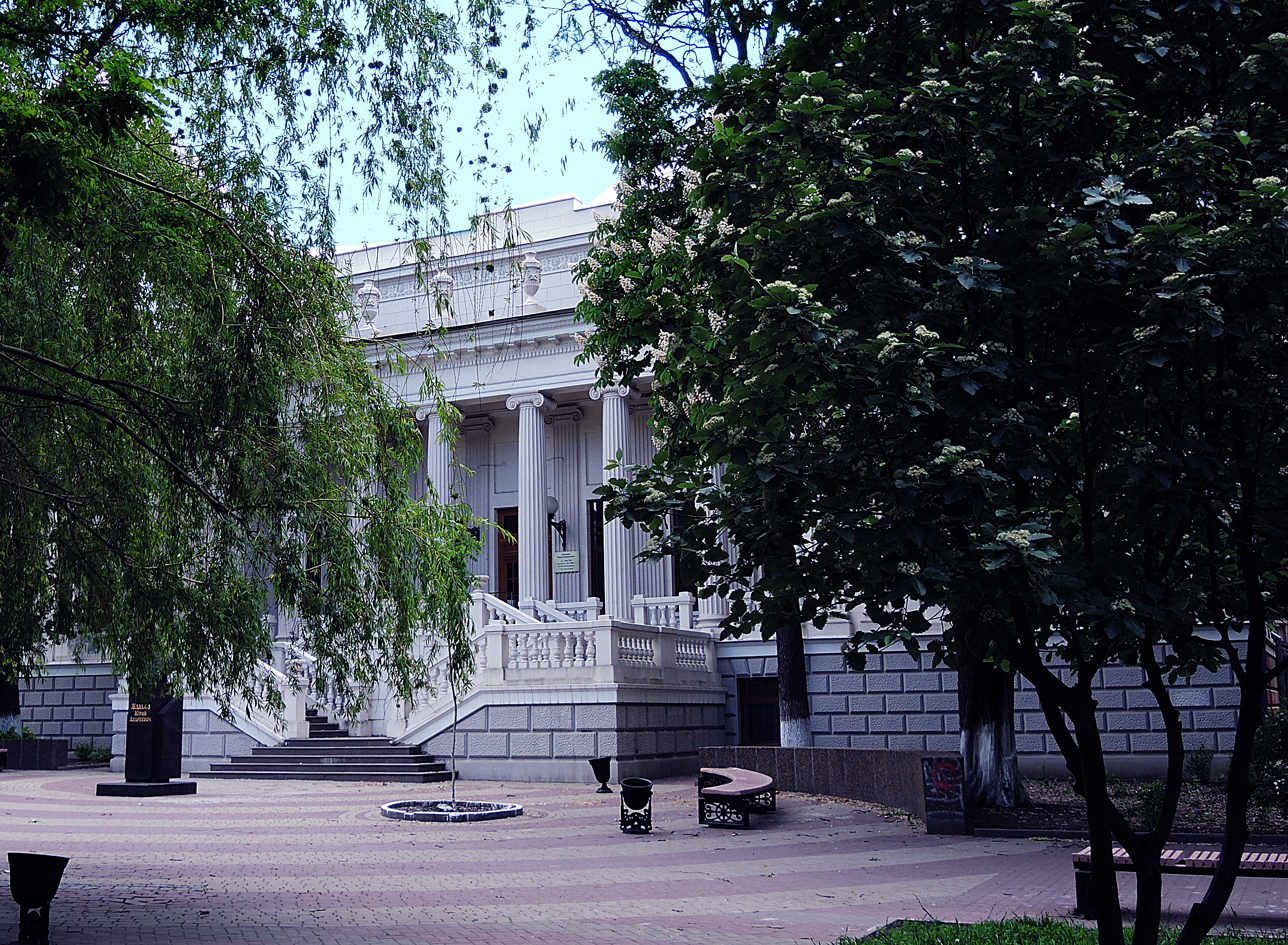
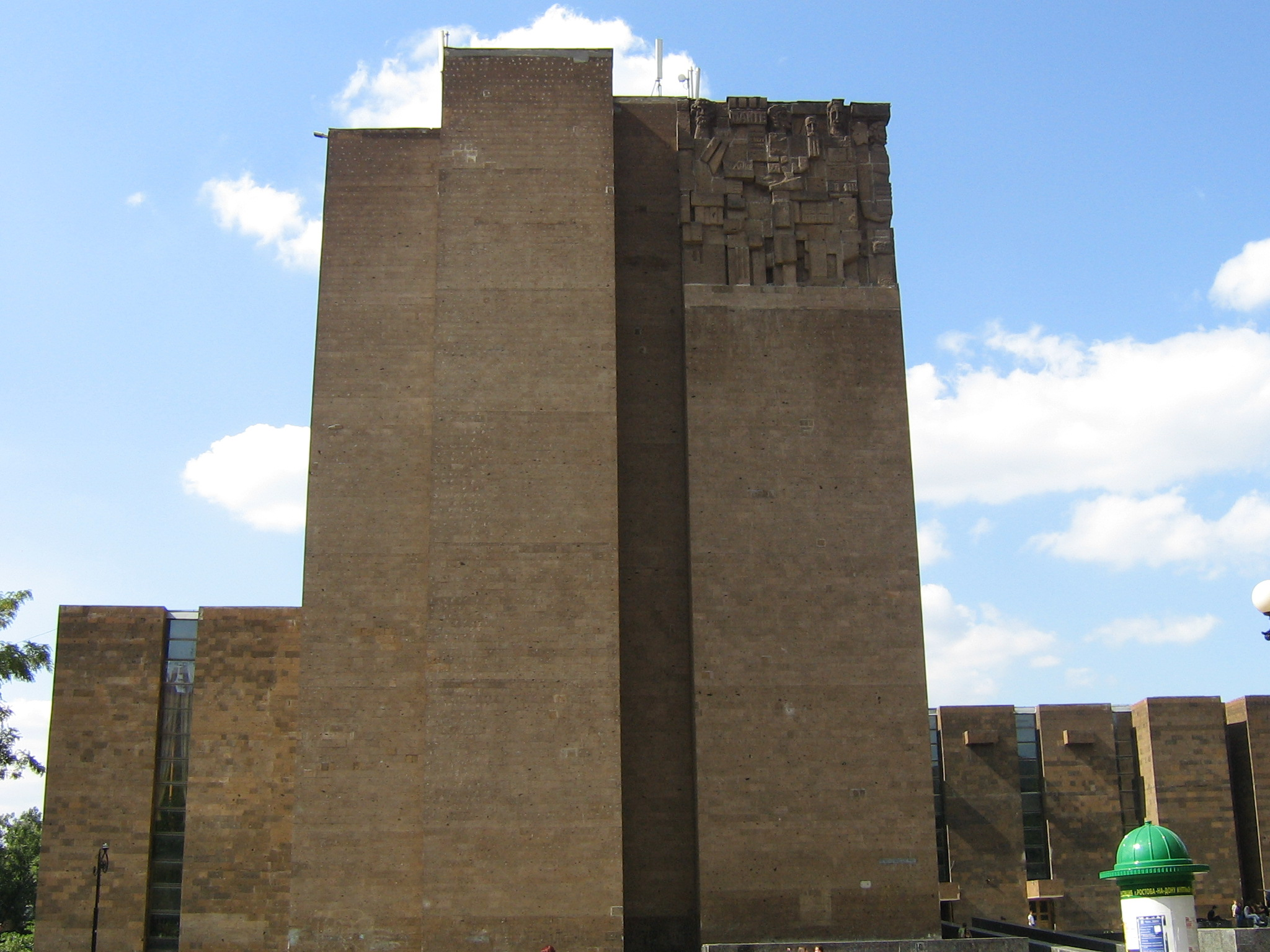
Number	Picture	Description
13		The Bakulin's apartment house. It is a monument of civil architecture of the late 19th century.
47		The Reznichenko House was built in the late 1890s in neo-baroque style. It is considered to be an object of cultural heritage.
51		The Kushnarev House was built in the early 1900s. It was a revenue house, and belonged to the famous Rostov manufacturer Vasiliy Semyonovich Kushnarev. The building is considered to be an object of cultural heritage.
65		The Mnatsakanova House was built in 1911-1915. It was a revenue house. The building is considered to be an object of cultural heritage.
75		The Lashch revenue house was built in the early 20th century. It is considered to be an object of cultural heritage.
78		The house was built in 1960. Poets A. G. Garnackeryan, A. P. Olenich-Gnenenko and writer G. F. Sholokhov-Sinyavsky lived here.
79		The Suprunov Mansion was built in the early 20th century. It is considered to be an object of cultural heritage.
83		The Mansion of Eva Spielrein was built in 1897. Sabina Nikolayevna Spielrein, who later became a famous psychoanalyst, spent her childhood here. The building is considered to be an object of cultural heritage.
89/57		The House of Ivan Zvorykin was built in 1914 by the architect Vasily Popov. The mayor of Rostov-on-Don Ivan Zvorykin and the playwright Vladimir Kirshon lived here. The building is considered to be an object of cultural heritage.
93		The Gavala's Residential House was built in the late 19th century. The building is considered to be an object of cultural heritage.
106		The Bostrikiny House was built in 1914 in the Art Nouveau style. It is today one of the Sberbank's offices. The building is considered to be an object of cultural heritage.
114		The Mansion of Pavel Kramer was built in the 1910s. Today it is a restaurant. The building is considered to be an object of cultural heritage.
115		The Rostov Regional Museum of Fine Arts is located in the Petrov Mansion, built in the late 19th century. The building is considered to be an object of cultural heritage.
116		The revenue house of Pavel Kramer was built in the 1900s. The building is considered to be an object of cultural heritage.
148		The Paramonov mansion was built in 1914 for the book publisher Nikolai Paramonov. The mansion was designed by the architect Leonid Aeberg. The building is currently occupied by the Y.A. Zhdanov Scientific Library of Southern Federal University. The house is of Neoclassicist style and is considered to be an object of cultural heritage of federal importance.
175а		The Don State Public Library.

== Bibliography ==
- Волошинова Л. Ф. Пушкинская улица. — Ростов-на-Дону: «Донской издательский дом», 2000. — ISBN 5-87688-250-X.
