= Ivan Zvorykin House =

- Дом Ивана Зворыкина
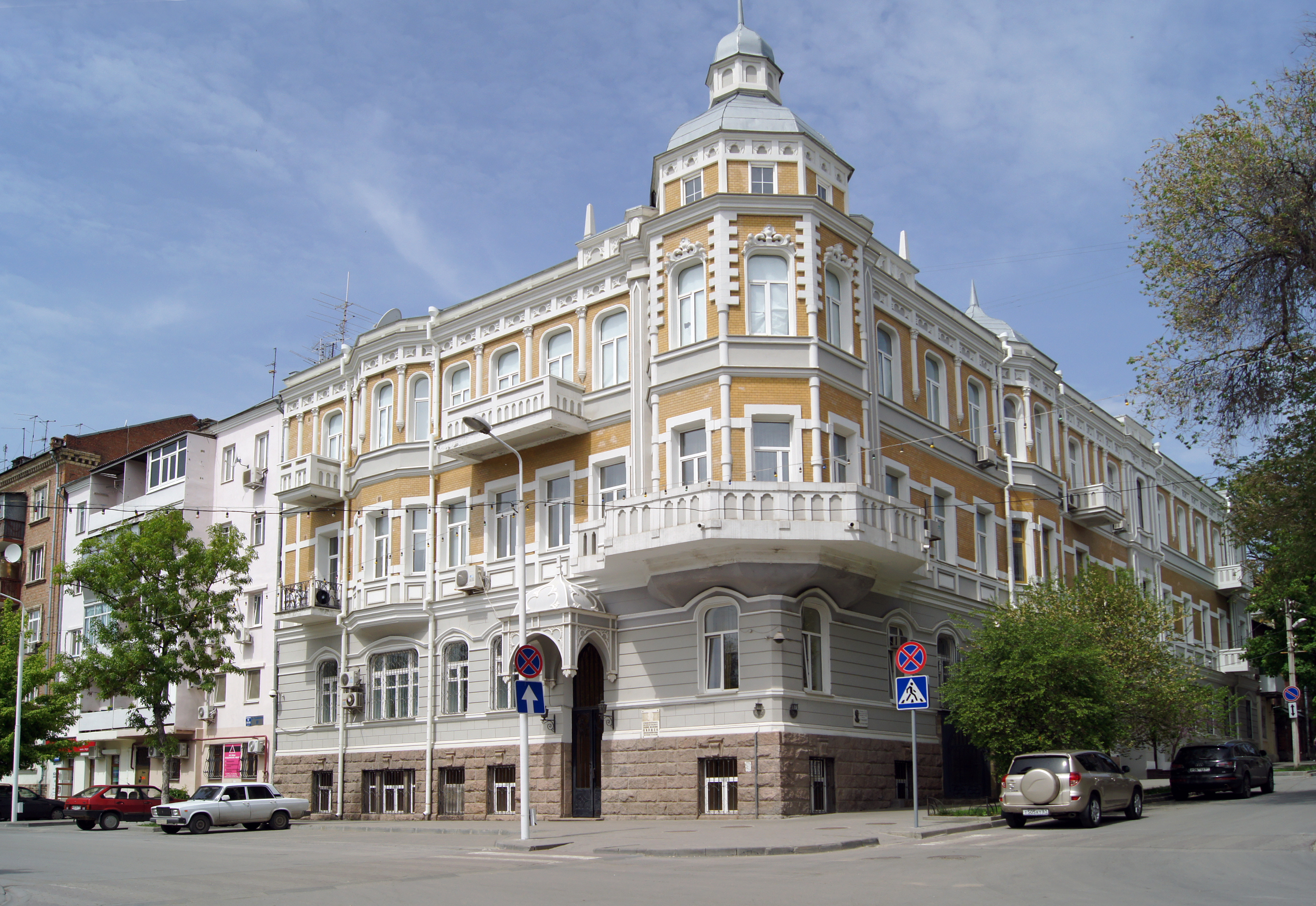
- 47°13′29″N 39°42′41″E
- Location: 89/57, Pushkinskaya Street, Rostov-on-Don
- Completion date: 1914

The Ivan Zvorykin House (Russian: Дом Ивана Зворыкина) is a building in Rostov-on-Don located at the intersection of Pushkinskaya Street and Semashko Lane. It was built in 1914 to the design of architect Vasily Popov. In the period of the Russian Empire, the house was the office and residence of Rostov-on-Don's mayor, major-general Ivan Nikolayevich Zvorykin. Soviet playwright Vladimir Kirshon lived in the house between 1923 and 1926. The building has the status of an object of cultural heritage of regional significance.

== History and description ==
The house was built in 1914 to the design of architect Vasily Popov. It housed the offices and residence of Rostov-on-Don's mayor, major-general Ivan Nikolayevich Zvorykin. After the 1917 Russian Revolution and the establishment of Soviet power, the house was nationalized. For a time it was occupied by various offices, institutions, residential apartments and a hostel of the soviet school. Some of the original decor was lost .

Soviet playwright Vladimir Kirshon lived in the house between 1923 and 1926, in communal flat number 10, with windows overlooking the yard. His spouse, Rita Korn-Kirshon, remembered: "In a small room, clean, always tidy, there was a desk, two chairs, a bed. There was a pile of books and fresh magazines on the table".

In the 2000s, the second floor of the house was occupied by the governor of Rostov Oblast Vladimir Chub and his family. The building was restored and a new Italian elevator was installed.

The three-storey house occupies the corner of the block, its facades front Pushkinskaya Street and Semashko Lane. The house is built in the Art Nouveau style with gothic elements. The uniform architectural and artistic appearance of the facades is determined by the forms of window openings, bay windows, and sections set forward or back. The ground floor is rusticated. Gothic features of the design include a frieze with three-quarter columns, decorative kokoshniks over the first floor windows. The facades of the building are crowned with attics with lancet niches. The main entrance has the form of a lancet arch. The corner of the building is emphasized with a hexagonal bay window framed with a balcony at the level of the second floor and topped with a turret with a dome. Initially, figures of knights were placed on a parapet of the tower, but these were dismantled in the 1960s.

The Ivan Zvorykin House has a complex layout. It is divided into two sections with separate entrances: from Pushkinskaya Street and from Semashko Lane. Each section has a two-flight staircase and an elevator. Apartments are located around the staircase.
