= Alexander Brener =

Russian-Jewish performance artist and activist

- Born: 1957; Alma-Ata, Kazak ASSR, Soviet Union
- Education: Kazakh National Pedagogic University (named after Abay)
- Known for: Performance art, literature art-activism
- Movement: Moscow Actionism, Neoism, Actionism

Alexander Davidovich Brener (Russian: Александр Бренер) (born 1957, in Alma-Ata, Kazak ASSR, Soviet Union), is a Russian performance artist and a self-described political activist. He is considered one of the main figures of Moscow Actionism along with Oleg Kulik.

== Work ==
Brener's performances of note include defecating in front of a painting by Vincent van Gogh at the Museum of Fine Arts in Moscow, having sex in front of the Monument to Alexander Pushkin (Rostov-on-Don), and vandalizing art works by other artists.

He was jailed in 1997 for painting a green dollar sign on Kazimir Malevich's painting Suprematisme. In the court case Brener said in his defense:

The cross is a symbol of suffering, the dollar sign a symbol of trade and merchandise. On humanitarian grounds are the ideas of Jesus Christ of higher significance than those of the money. What I did was not against the painting. I view my act as a dialogue with Malevich.

Giancarlo Politi, the editor of Flash Art, resolutely defended Brener from the pages of his magazine, stirring controversy and campaigning for his acquittal. Brener was sentenced to five months in prison, where he wrote the essay Obossani Pistolet. In the text he explains his beliefs and summarizes his actions. In 2000 Brener disrupted the press conference of Manifesta 3 in Ljubljana by spraying slogans on the presentation screen and handing out leaflets stating: "Demolish neo-liberalist multicultural art system now!" Bodyguards came and dragged Brener out of the hall. He was later arrested by Slovenian secret police in the streets. In 2003 Brener vandalized the work of Swiss-Italian artist Gianni Motti during the opening of Motti's exhibition "Turnover" at Artra Gallery in Milan.

Brener co-wrote a number of books together with Austrian artist and critic Barbara Schurz, including Bukaka spat Here, Tattoos auf Gefängnissen, Anti Technologies of Resistance and The Art of Destruction.

Brener is mentioned in passing in Stewart Home's 2007 novel Memphis Underground.

An artwork by the art collective IOCOSE is dedicated to Brener.

== Books ==
- Furzende Völker: Ein Dokumental-Roman (2000, Austria, Edition Selene. ISBN 3-85266-130-7)
- Demolish Serious Culture! (2000, Austria, Edition Selene. ISBN 3-85266-148-X)
- Tattoos auf Gefängnissen (2001, Austria, Edition Selene. ISBN 3-85266-157-9)
- Bukaka Spat Here (2001, Austria, Edition Selene. ISBN 3-9501567-1-2; 2002, UK, ISBN 0-9520274-4-5)
- The Art of Destruction (2005, Austria)

== See also ==
- Neoism
