= Petrov Mansion =

- Особняк Петрова
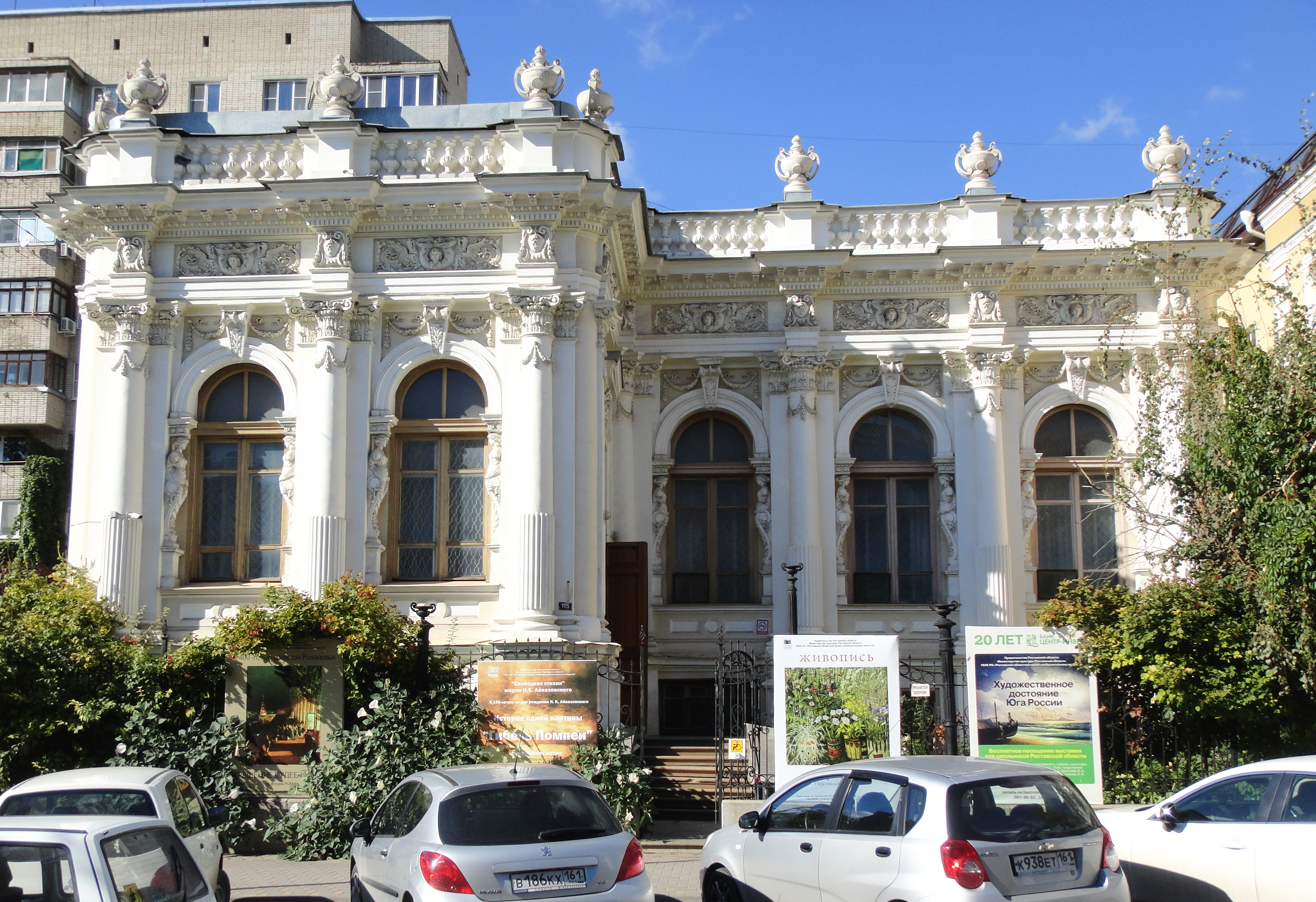
- 47°13′33″N 39°42′57″E
- Location: 115 Pushkinskaya Street, Rostov-on-Don

The Petrov Mansion (Russian: Особняк Петрова) is a building in Rostov-on-Don, at 115 Pushkinskaya Street. The house was built at the end of the 19th century, to the design of the Rostov architect Nikolai Doroshenko. Since 1959 the mansion has housed the Rostov Regional Museum of Fine Arts. The building has the status of an object of cultural heritage of regional significance.

== History ==
The mansion was built at the end of the 19th century. Its first owner was A. A. Dombrovsky, who sold it soon after acquiring it. By 1898, the mansion belonged to the management of the Vladikavkaz Railway.

At the end of the 19th century the management of the Vladikavkaz Railway conducted an extensive legal case connected with the acquisition of the land plots under their railway lines. The head of the railway announced that the lawyer who won this case would receive Dombrovsky's mansion as a gift. The Rostov lawyer Apollon Petrovich Petrov undertook to defend the interests of the railway, and won the legal case. As a result, he was appointed legal adviser to the Vladikavkaz Railway and received the mansion as a gift.

Petrov lived in the mansion together with his wife and children. Since 1913 the house was officially owned by his wife Sofiya. After the October Revolution, the Petrovs moved to France. In 1920, the house was nationalized. In the 1920s the Children's Commune occupied the building, followed by the House of Education Workers, and then the Union of Miners. In the 1930s the mansion housed the Rostov Regional Council of Industrial Cooperation, the local branch of the Spartak sports society, and the regional local industry. After the Great Patriotic War, the building was transferred to the regional department of affairs of construction and architecture. During this period, an attic was added to the mansard, a concrete staircase was built, and a wooden terrace and a marble fountain in the garden were dismantled. At the same time, the fireplace and several carved doors of the mansion were lost. In 1959, the building was transferred to the Rostov Regional Museum of Fine Arts.

== Design ==
The Petrov Mansion is built in an eclectic style; its design combines baroque, classical and renaissance motifs. The main (southern) façade facing Pushkinskaya Street has an asymmetric composition. The walls of the main floor are decorated with columns of the composite order. Window openings have semi-circular ends with capstones. Archivolts are based on caryatids. Over the main entrance is a heraldic sign. The frieze above the windows is richly decorated with stucco elements: female heads, griffins, cartouches, and floral ornaments. On the balustrade there is a row of balusters and pedestals.

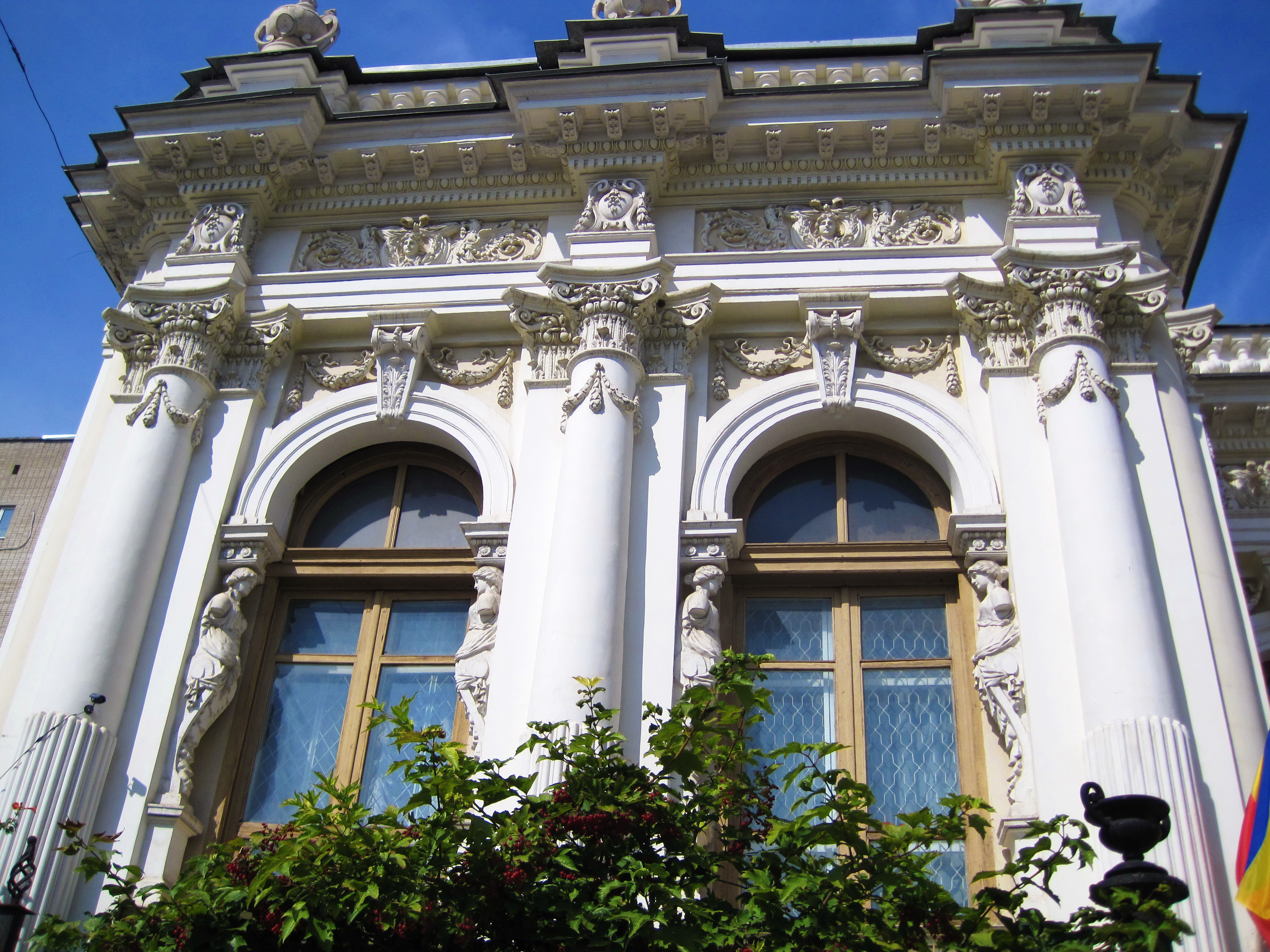

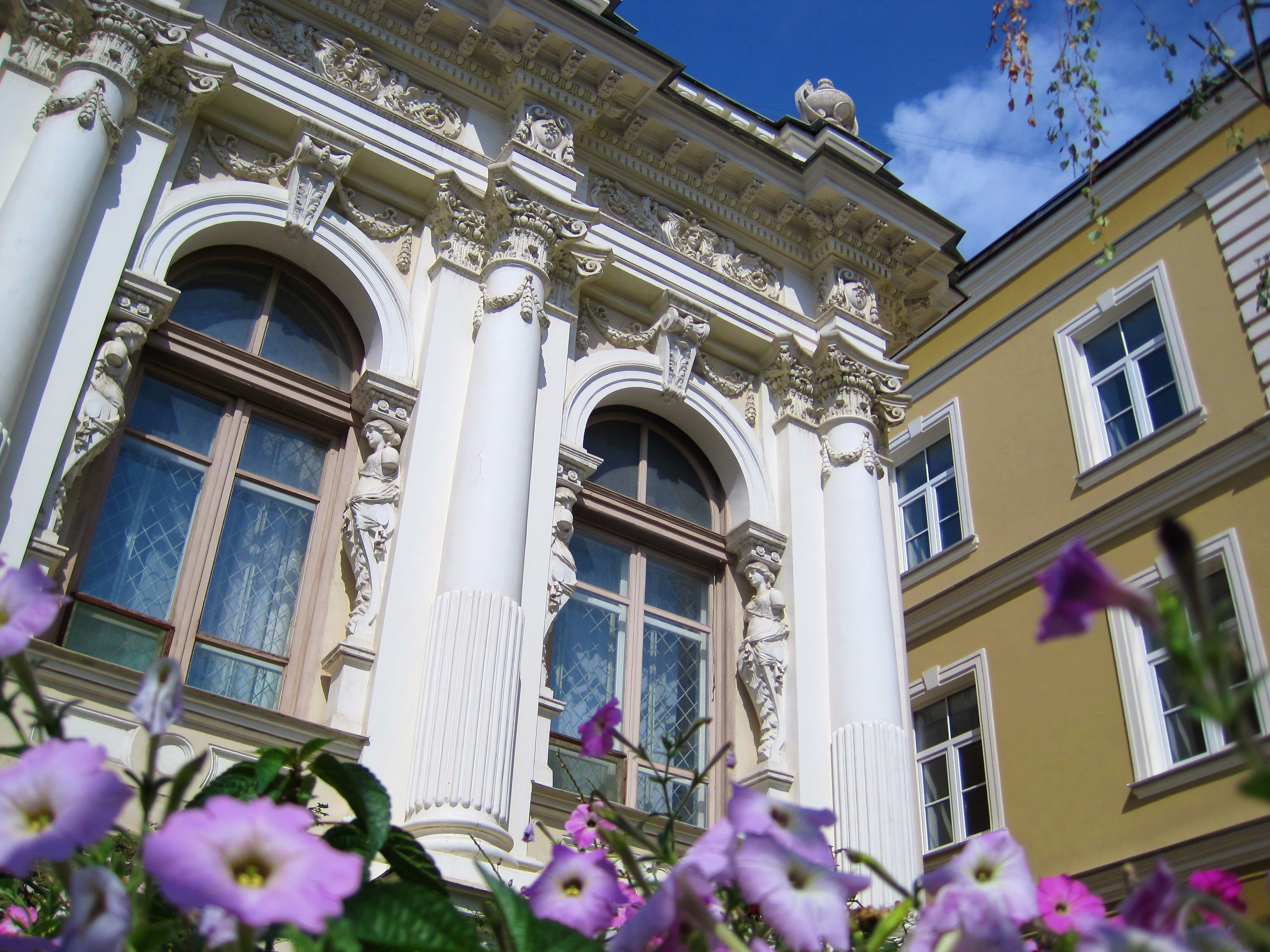

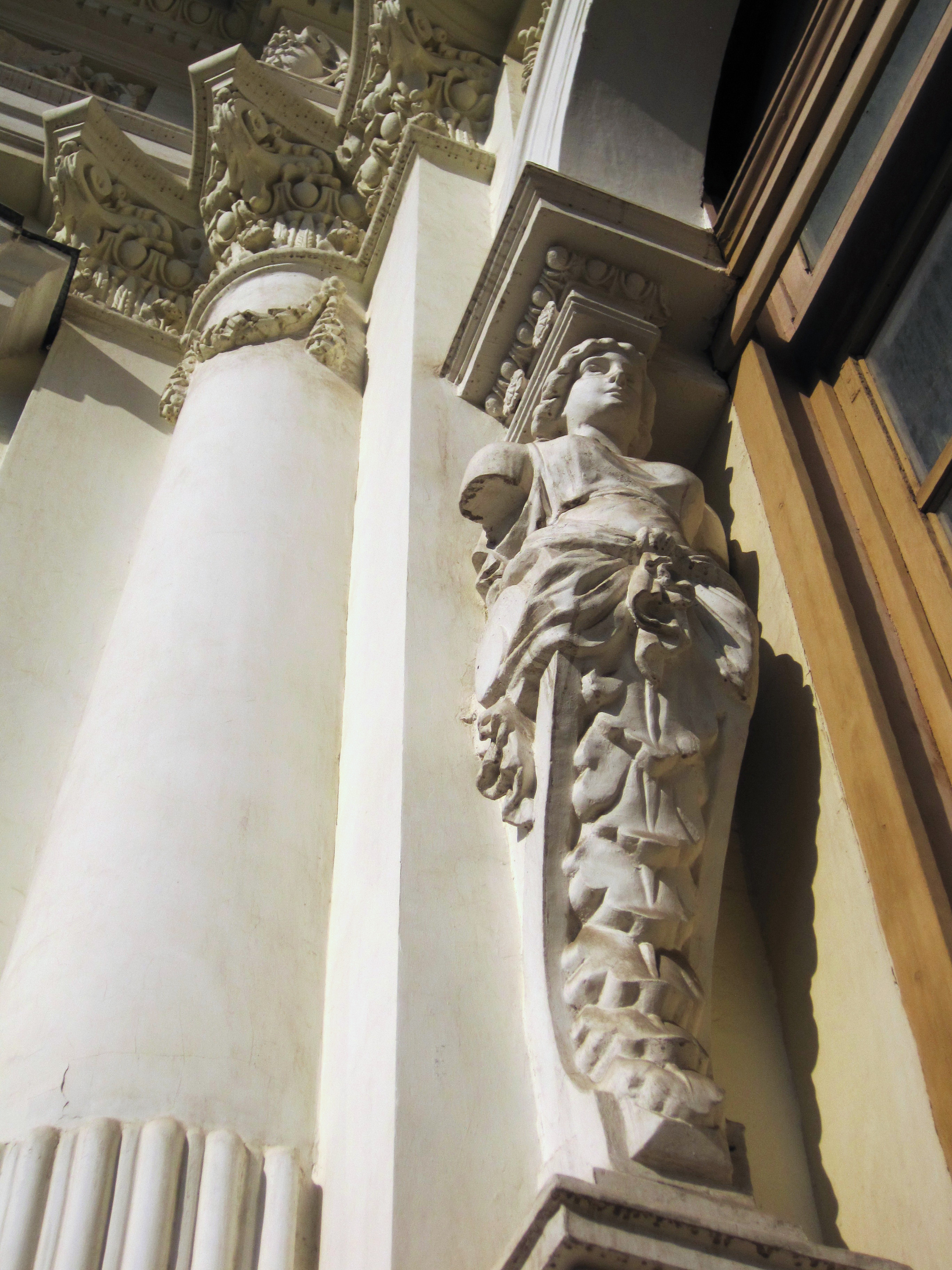
