= Kushnarev House =

Coordinates: 47°13′23.8″N 39°42′16.9″E

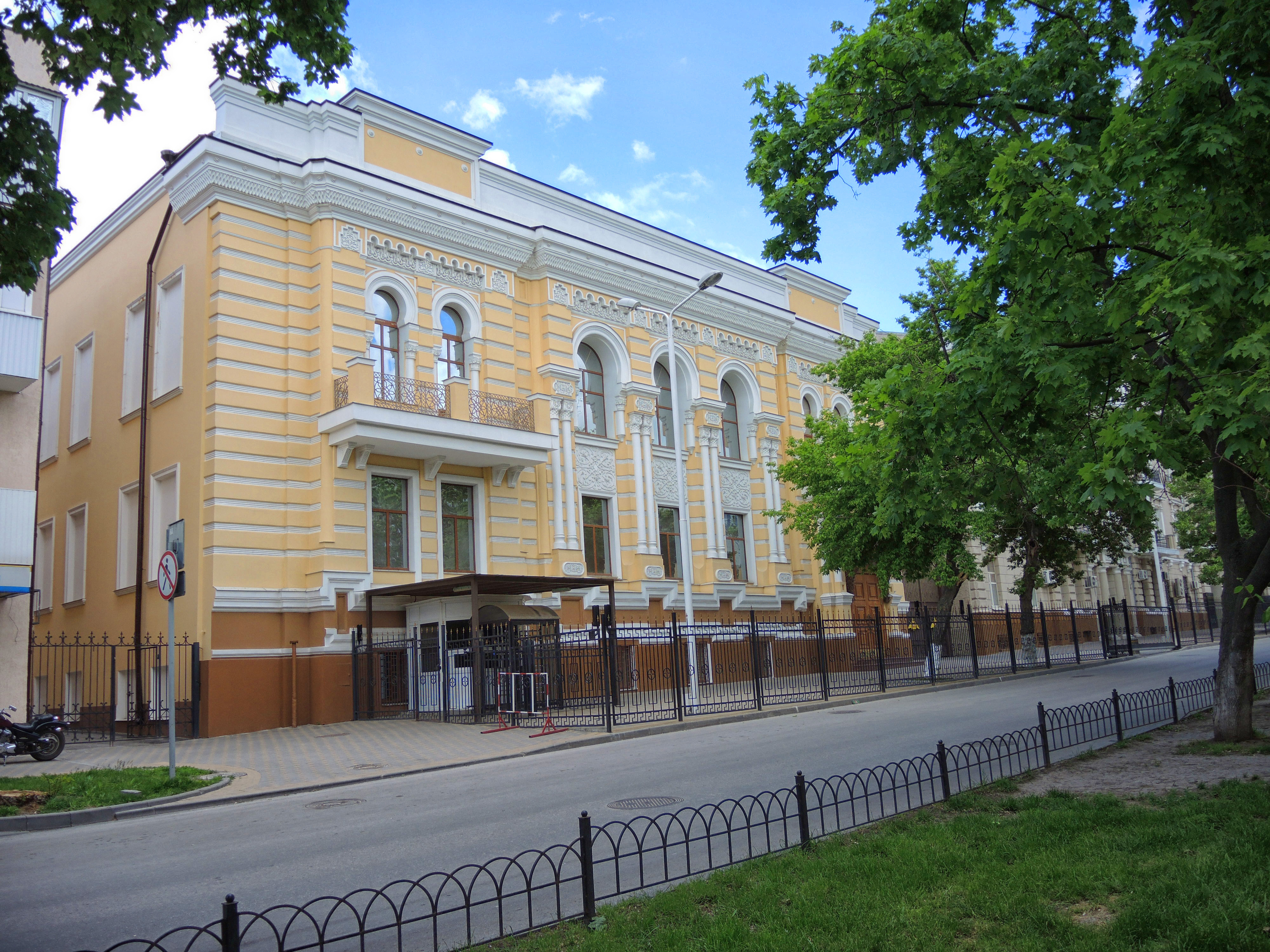
Kushnarev House

The Kushnarev House (Russian: Дом Кушнарёва, romanized: Dom Kushnaryova) is a building in the Leninsky District of Rostov-on-Don, Russia. Originally built as a revenue house, it is located at 51 Pushkinskaya street. The Kushnarev House has the status of an object of cultural heritage of regional significance.

== History ==
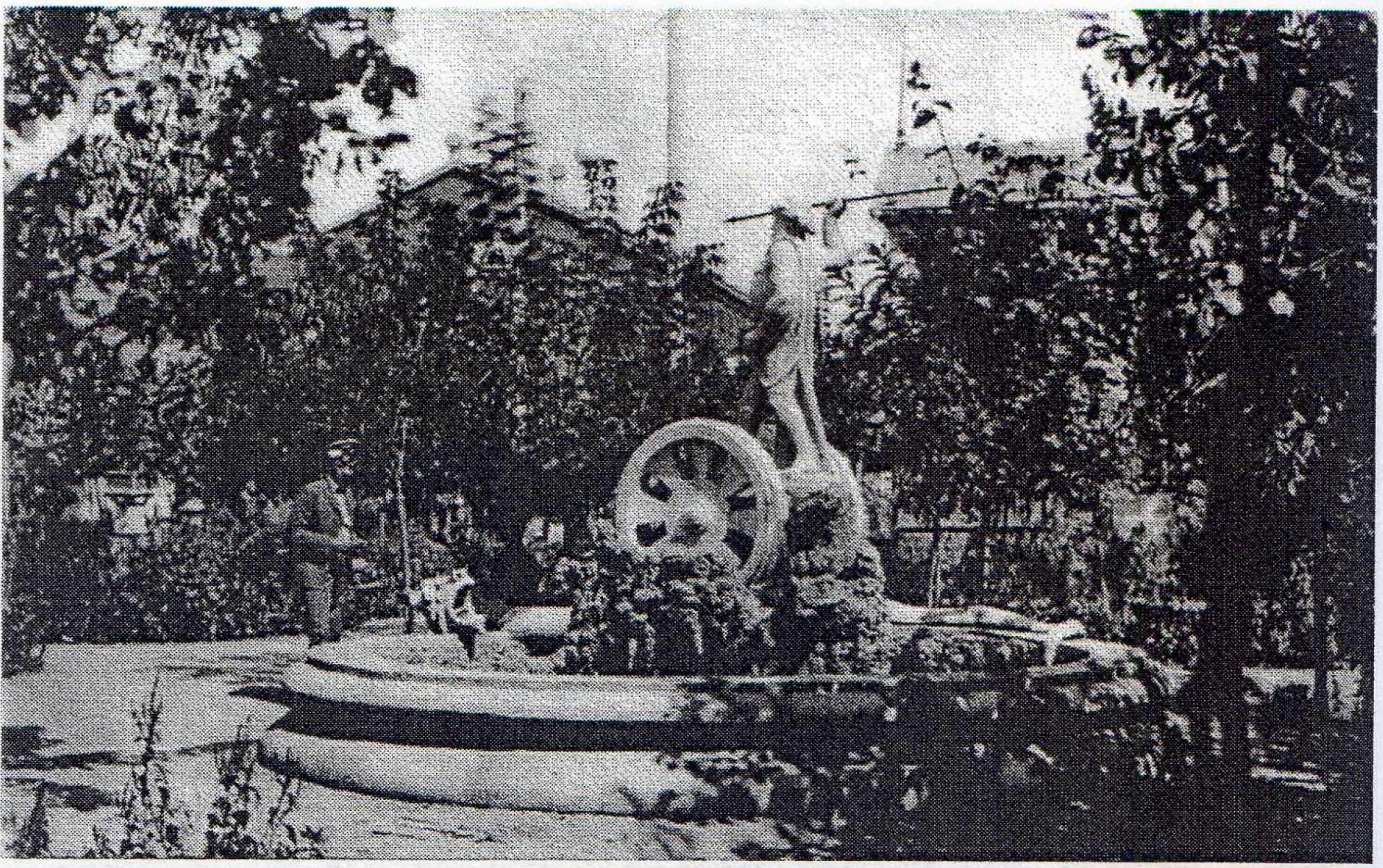
Fountain in Buff summer garden in the early 1900s

The Kushnarev House was built in the early 1900s, for the Rostov manufacturer Vasiliy Semyonovich Kushnarev. His brother Yakov Kushnarev owned a tobacco factory near this building. Dwellings in the Kushnarev House were rented. Before the revolution of 1917, a restaurant occupied the ground floor, with an open veranda on the side of the courtyard. There was an exit to the prestigious Buff Summer Garden from the courtyard of the building.

The building was nationalized in 1920, during the Soviet period. It was transferred to the headquarters of the North Caucasus Military District. A mess-hall was located in the building. The roof was destroyed during the Second World War. It was restored with several changes. The Kushnarev House is currently owned by the Southern Military District. The staff of the Southern Military District restored the building in 2012, resulting in the partial loss of its original appearance.

== Description ==
The building was designed in the Neo-Moorish style. The high second floor windows have semicircular upper parts. The archivolts of the windows are supported by Corinthian twin engaged columns. The high cornice is crowned with low parapet. The architecture of the Kushnarev House employs elements of eastern architecture decorations. These include stucco moldings and Islamic ornaments. The facade is decorated with banded rustications. The building initially had a marble staircase and dome.
