= Bostrikiny House =

House in Rostov-on-Don, Russia

Coordinates: 47°13′32.1″N 39°43′05.3″E

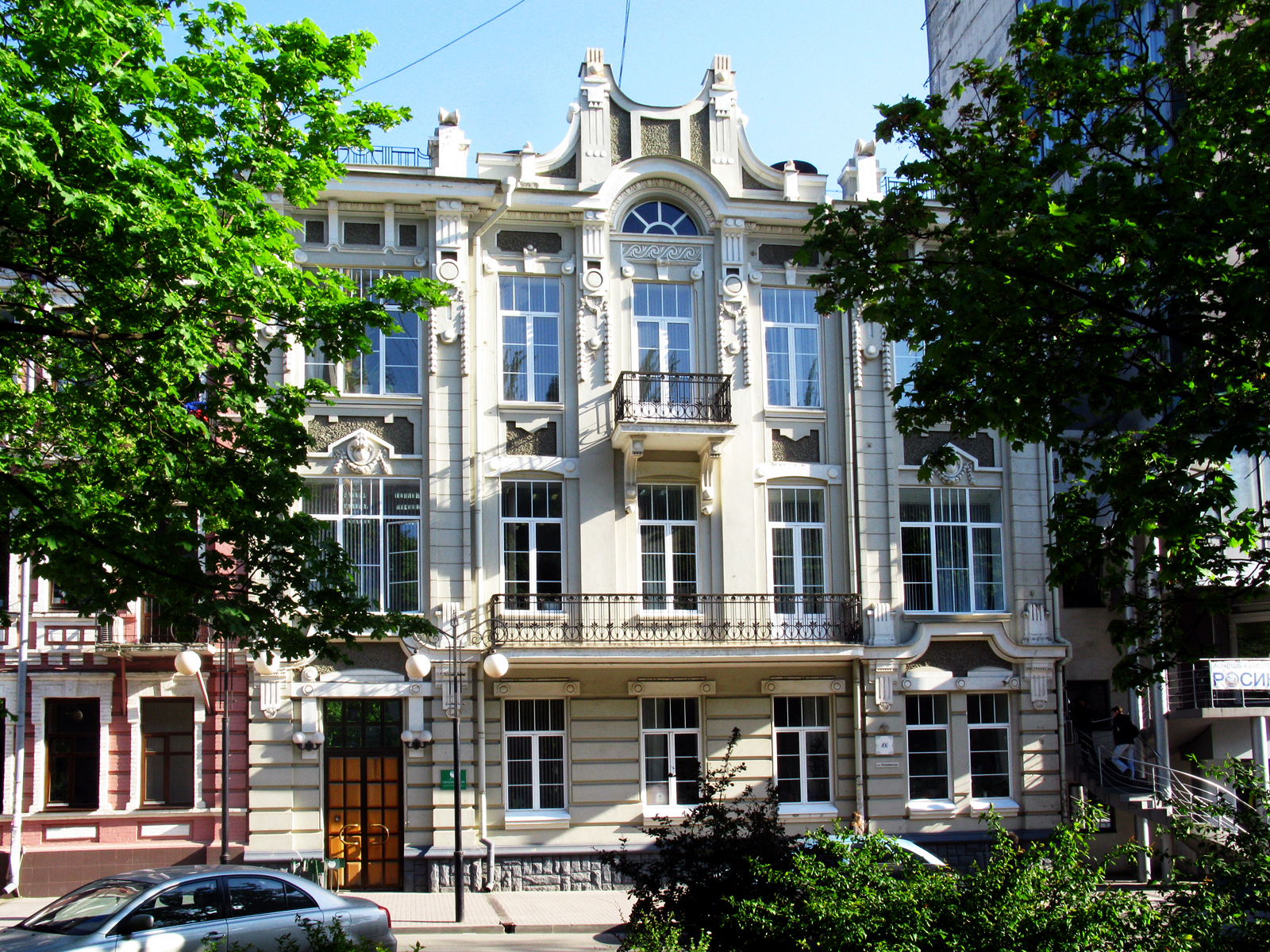
Bostrikiny House

The Bostrikiny House (Russian: Дом Бострикиных, romanized: Dom Bostrikinikh) is a historic house in Rostov-on-Don. It currently houses a branch of Sberbank. The house is located at 106 Pushkinskaya Street (Russian: Пушкинская улица, 106) in the Kirovsky City District of Rostov-on-Don. The building has the status of an object of cultural heritage of Russia of regional significance.

== History ==
The house was built in 1914 to a design by civil engineer Semyon Vasilyevich Polipin. It initially belonged to Ivan Bostrikin and his wife Anna Bostrikina. The house was nationalized in the 1920s after the establishment of Soviet rule, and was divided into communal apartments. Sberbank of Russia took possession of the building in 1997, and it was substantially repaired after the live-in tenants had left. Sberbank's offices occupy all three floors of the Bostrikiny House.

== Description ==
The house has a symmetrical facade crowned with an arched attic, and is decorated in the Art Nouveau style with elements of classicism and irrationalism. The first floor is decorated with banded rustication. The second and third floors have large windows and balconies with delicate iron-cast railings. The cornice is crowned with parapet established between decorative pedestals.
