= Gavala House =

Coordinates: 47°13′29″N 39°42′33″E

- Жилой Дом Гавала (Russian)
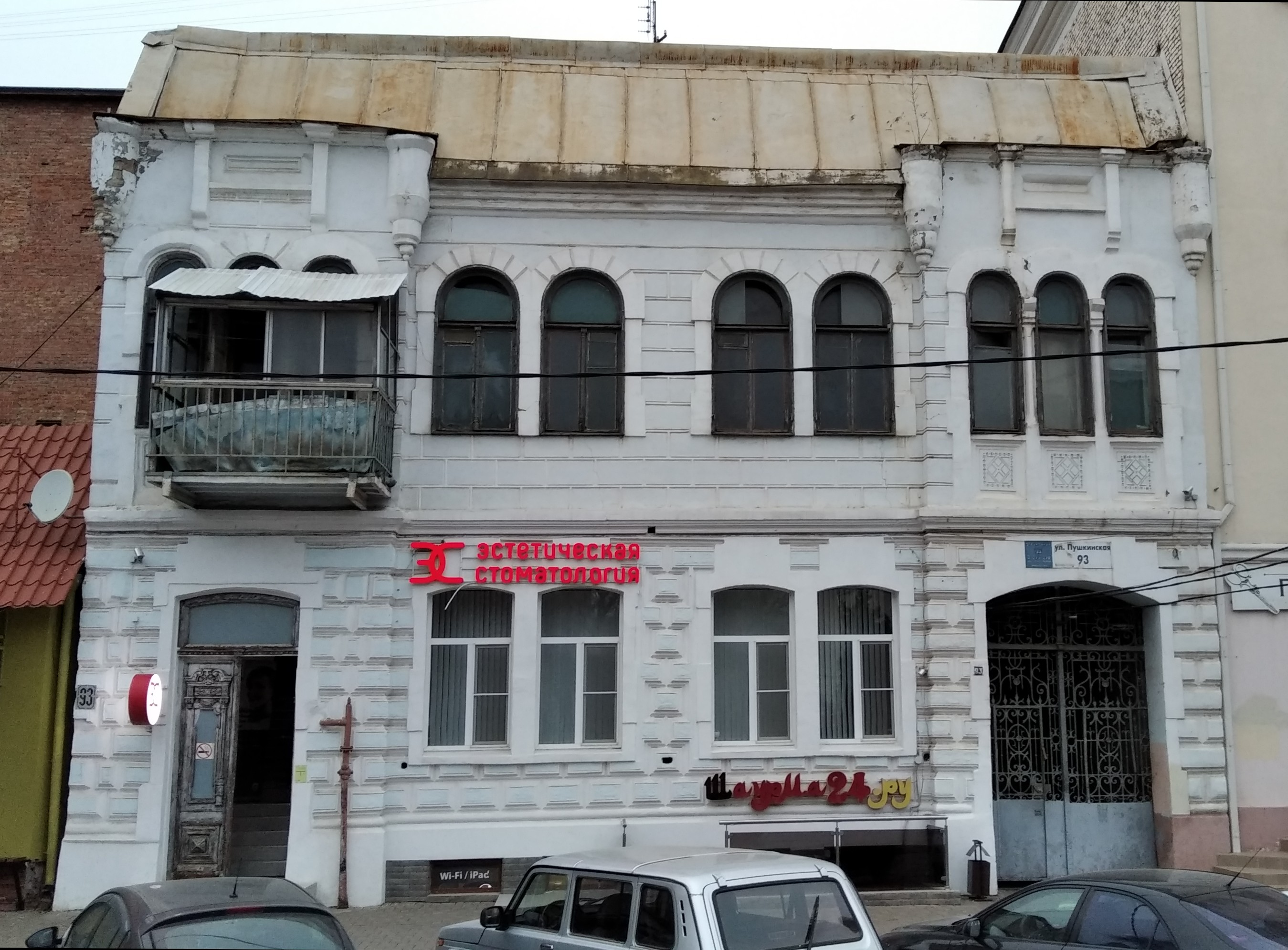
- Gavala House

- Location within Rostov Oblast
- Type: House

History
- Built: 19th century

The Gavala House (Russian: Дом Гавала) is a building in Rostov-on-Don at 93 Pushkinskaya Street. It was built as a town house in the late 19th century. The building has the status of an object of cultural heritage of Russia of regional significance, and is № 6130164000.

== History ==
The first owner of the house was Nikolai Antonovich Gavala, a member of the Russian Stock Exchange Society of Greek origin. Documents show that by 1913 the owner of the house was Maria Georgiyevna Gavala, presumably Nikolai Antonovich's wife. The Gavala family left Rostov-on-Don during the Russian Civil War, and the house was nationalized during the Soviet period. It was divided up into communal housing, and later repaired several times.

== Architecture ==
The two-storied house is located on the red line of Pushkinskaya Street. As in many other residential buildings of the late 19th century, elements of different styles were combined in its architecture. The frontage has two arches: a main entrance (on the left) and entrance to the yard (on the right). On the forged lattice of the entrance gate there are monograms with the letters "N" and "G". Initially there were also two small forged lattices with monograms at the front entrance, but only one has survived to the present day. The walls of the first floor are decorated with wood in a rustic style. The window openings are decorated by various platbands. On the second floor, above the side gates, narrow windows are grouped in threes. In the central part there are two double windows. The facade is finished by parapets with semi-columns and decorative arms. The attic floor has been extensively rebuilt.
