= Barbara Schurz =

Austrian artist (born 1973)

- Барбара Шурц
- Born: 1973 (age 52–53); Klagenfurt, Carinthia, Austria
- Education: Vienna University
- Alma mater: Vienna Academy of Fine Arts
- Known for: Performance art Activism
- Movement: Poststructuralism

Barbara Schurz (Russian transliteration: Барбара Шурц) (born 1973) is an Austrian artist and self-described "revolutionary activist".

== Life and work ==
At Vienna University she pursued Slavic Studies and Women's Studies. Subsequently, she studied conceptual art at the Vienna Academy of Fine Arts. She began traveling around the world, living as an artist and author in Moscow and Berlin, in addition to Vienna.

Schurz is best known for her books, co-written with Alexander Brener, that address the boundary between art and politics from an activist perspective. These are heavily influenced by poststructuralism, particularly the writings of Michel Foucault, and focus their attacks largely on capitalism and imperialism. Schurz accompanied Brener to the 'Violence to Endurance: Extreme Curating' art lecture at the ICA to both protest and involve themselves in the lecture. While there Brener defecated in front of the audience while Schurz threw peanuts at the lecturers.

== Books ==
- Was tun? (1999, ISBN 3-85266-101-3)
- Furzende Völker (2000, ISBN 3-85266-130-7)
- Tattoos auf Gefängnissen (2001, ISBN 3-85266-157-9)
- Bukaka Spat Here (2001, Austria, ISBN 3-9501567-1-2; 2002, UK, ISBN 0-9520274-4-5)

== See also ==
- List of Austrian writers
