= Kramer Mansion =

- Особняк Крамера
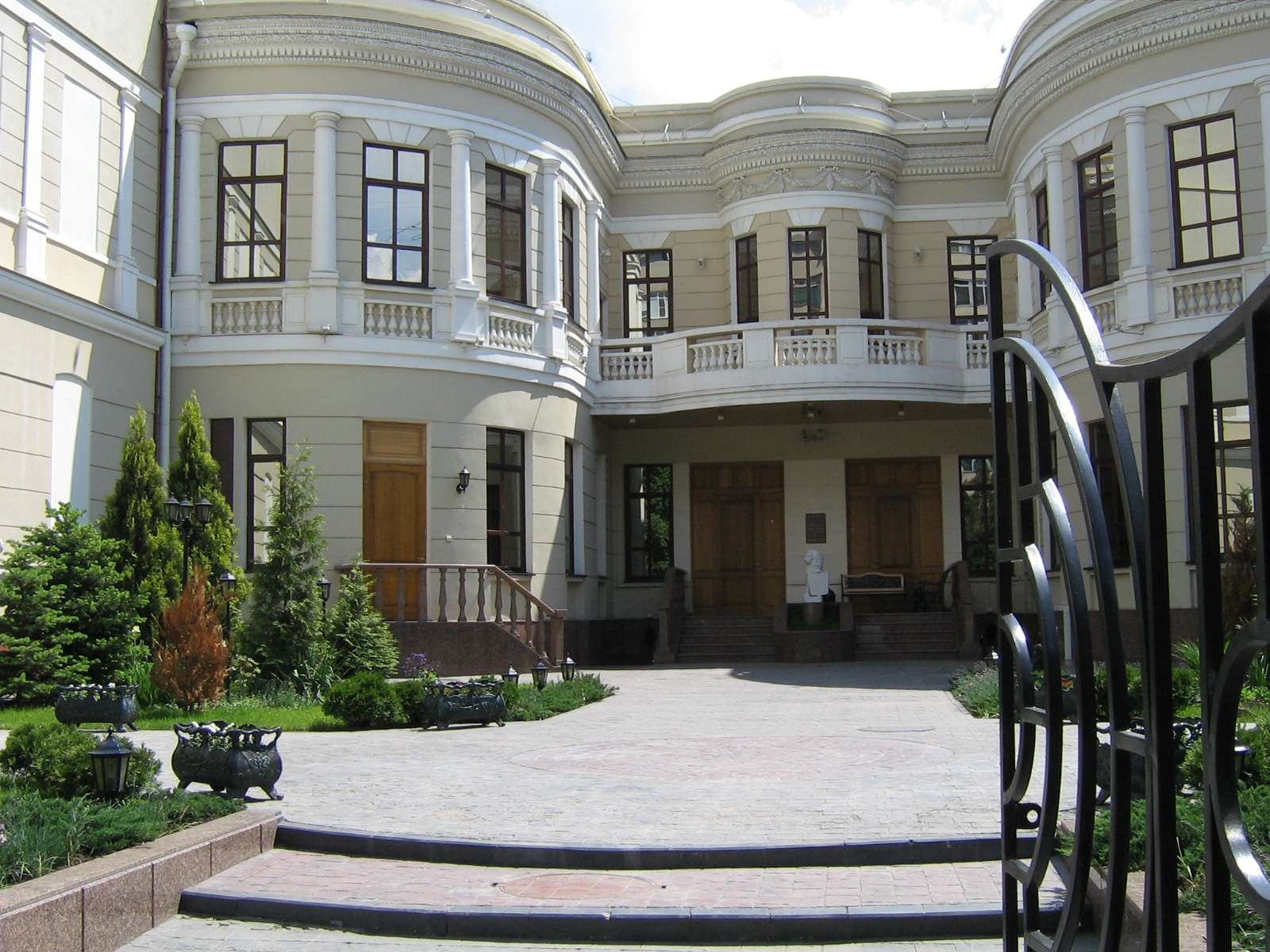
- 47.2254°N 39.7190°E
- Location: 114, Pushkinskaya Street, Rostov-on-Don

The Kramer Mansion (Russian: Особняк Крамера) is a building in Rostov-on-Don, at 114 Pushkinskaya Street. The mansion was built in the 1910 years for the Rostov philanthropist Pavel Ivanovich Kramer. In 1997 the mansion was listed as being of local interest. Since the 2000s, the mansion has housed the restaurant of the Rostov Public Assembly.

== History and description ==
The mansion was built for Pavel Ivanovich Kramer circa 1914. The mansion adjoined the Kramer apartment building, built in the 1900s. P. I. Kramer was known as a collector of paintings.

Kramer left Rostov-on-Don during the Russian Civil War. His collection of pictures passed to the regional museum of arts, and his mansion was nationalized. In the 1920s it was under the authority of the regional health department. After the Second World War the mansion housed a regional committee medical institution.

In 1982 the mansion was reconstructed under the supervision of architects N. A. Sergeyev and V. A. Korolyov. After the completion of the project, the building was transferred to the House of Writers and Composers.

By 1990s the mansion was in need of further repairs. To address the problem of maintenance costs, its space was used for various activities. The cellar was rented out as a restaurant. In the mid-nineties there were suggestions to open a literary museum in the house. But in 1999 the mansion was transferred to the Administration of Rostov Oblast and again underwent reconstruction to the design of architect G. Shevchenko. At the same time windows, parts of walls, the roof, and interfloor ceilings were replaced. After repairs, the building was transferred to the Rostov Public Assembly. The restaurant "Sobraniye" was then opened in the mansion.

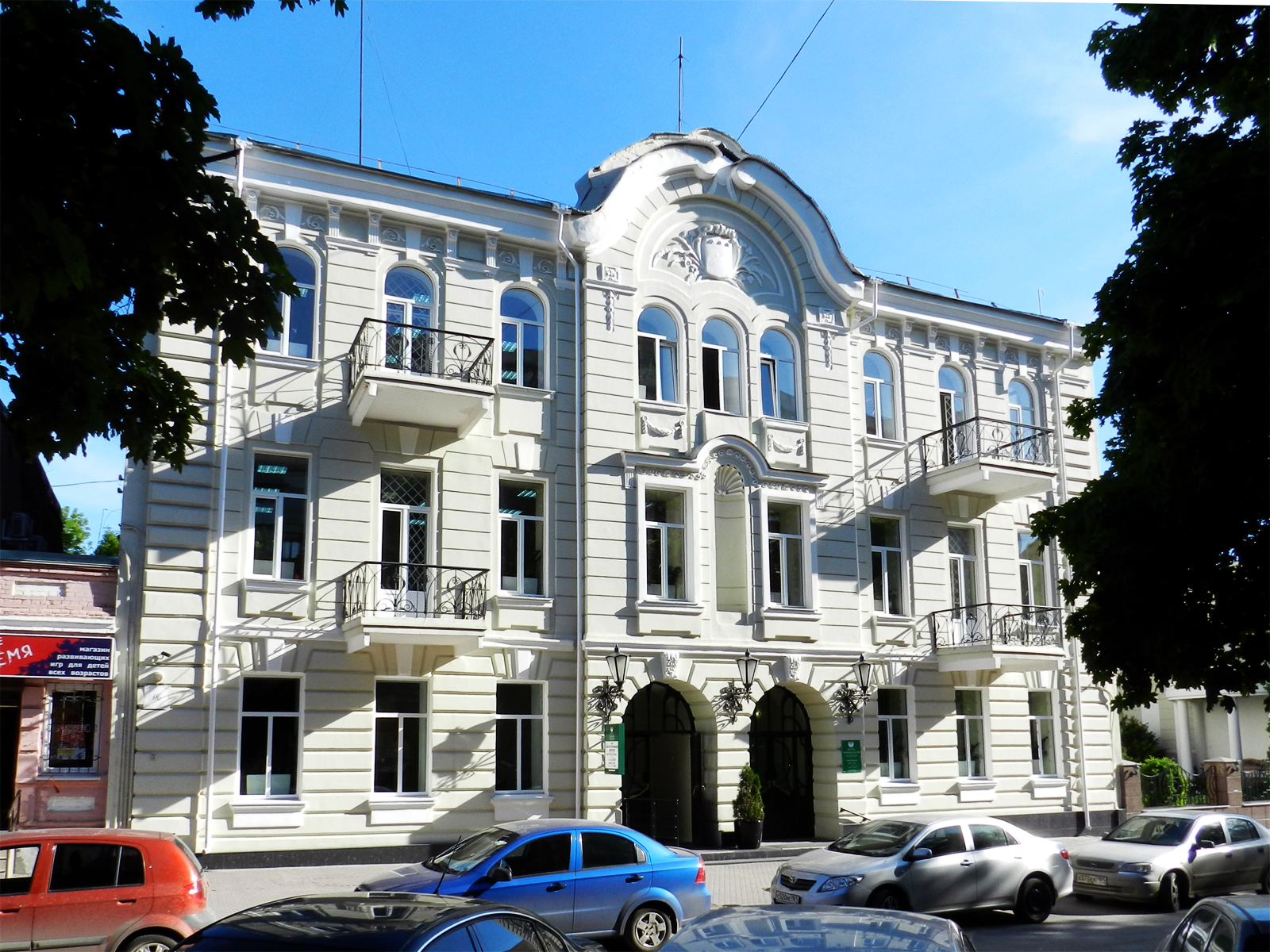
Kramer's apartment building, built in the 1900s, which adjoins the mansion

== Architecture ==
The two-storeyed mansion is located to the rear of the plot of land, it has a P-shaped floorplan. The façade is designed in the neoclassical style, with arched bay windows in its centre. Extended "wings" are located on the sides opposite each other. The walls of the mansion are rusticated. The façade is decorated with a cornice, plaster rods, garlands and balusters. The central part of the mansion originally housed reception halls and living rooms. On the sides were offices, living rooms and utility rooms. During the reconstruction in 1982, a one-storey extension was built near the east wing. In the western part of the site, a semi-rotunda gazebo was built. A new stucco ceiling was installed in the building, and a fireplace with tiles was installed on the second floor.
