= Profitable house of S. N. Mnatsakanova =

- Доходный дом С.Н. Мнацакановой
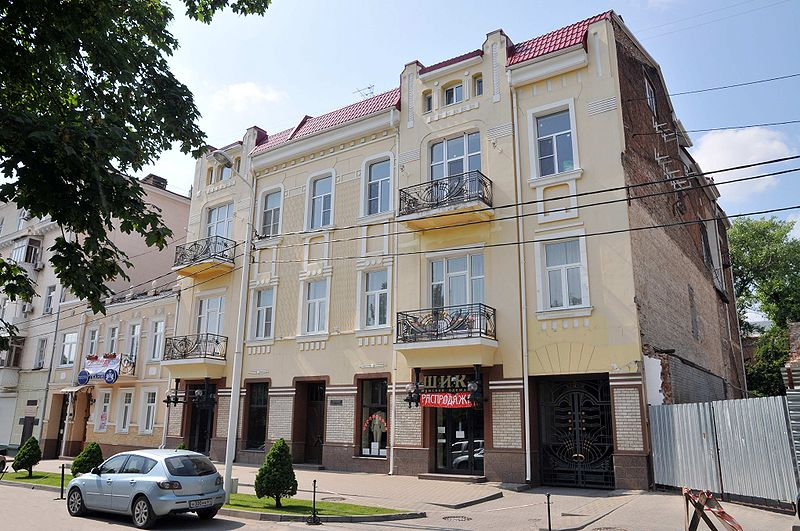
- Interactive map of Profitable house of S. N. Mnatsakanova
- Location: Rostov-on-Don, Pushkinskaya Street, house 65
- Beginning date: 1911
- Completion date: 1915

The Profitable house of S.N. Mnatsakanova (Russian: Доходный дом С.Н. Мнацакановой) is a building in Rostov-on-Don located on Pushkinskaya Street (house 65). The mansion was built during 1911 — 1915. According to the reference media about assessment immovable property, in 1911 — 1915 Serpuga Nikokhosyanovna Mnatsakanova owned the building. According to the reference media "All Rostov and Nakhchivan — on — Don for 1914", in the building the technical office Nessara was placed. Now the house consists of the trade rooms located on the first floor and inhabited, which are located on the second and third floors which considerable proportion belongs to the Rostov businessman Kurinov Alexander Gennadyevich. The building has the status of an object of cultural heritage of regional value (the order "Regional Inspectorate for Protection and Operation of Historical and Cultural Monuments" of 29.12.2004 № 191 "About the approval of the list of the revealed objects of cultural heritage").

== History and description ==
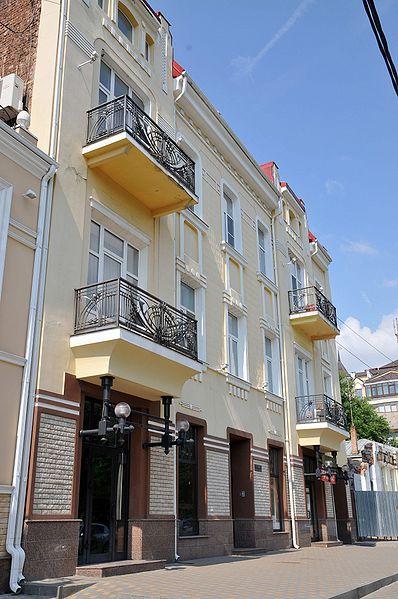

The house on Pushkinskaya Street between Budennovsky Avenue and Soborny Lane was built during 1911 — 1915 on the project of architects E. Gulin and S. Popilin in the modernist style. S. Poplin was a civil engineer, the member of the commission on the construction of the building of District court, public City Council in 1903 — 1913, participated in the telephone and technical commissions of the city. During the pre-revolutionary period the structure "The profitable house of S.N. Mnatsakanova, head of the 20th century" had the address: Pushkinskaya (Kuznetskaya) St., 81. Till 1911 the building was estimated at 3 700 rubles, and in 1915 its assessment made 25 100 rubles. S.N. Mnatsakanova owned the building.

After 1917, this house, as well as many others, the fate of nationalization comprehended and in it, communal flats are placed. For years the house withered, collapsed, changing tentative fine shape.

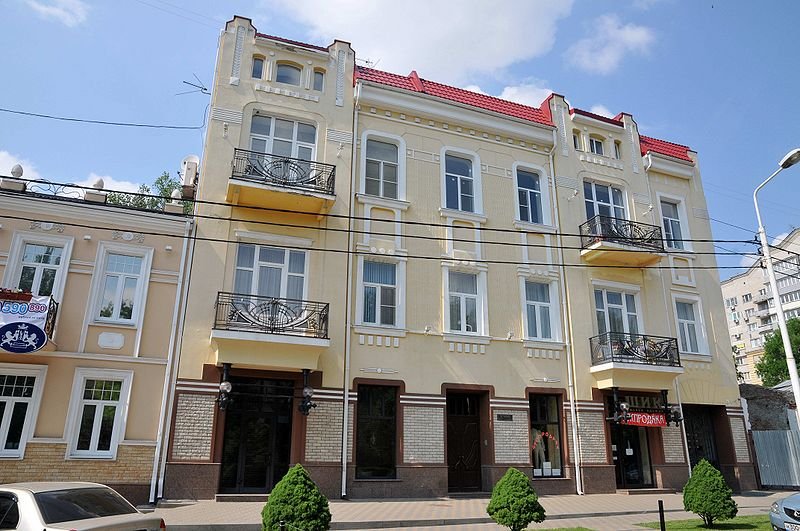

In the period of the end of the 1990th - the beginning of 2000, was acquired by the Rostov businessman Kurinov Alexander Gennadyevich the specified building. Dozens of residents from communal flats were moved to individual housing. The three-storied building is located on a red line of a building of Pushkinskaya Street.
