= Suprunov Mansion =

- Особняк Супрунова
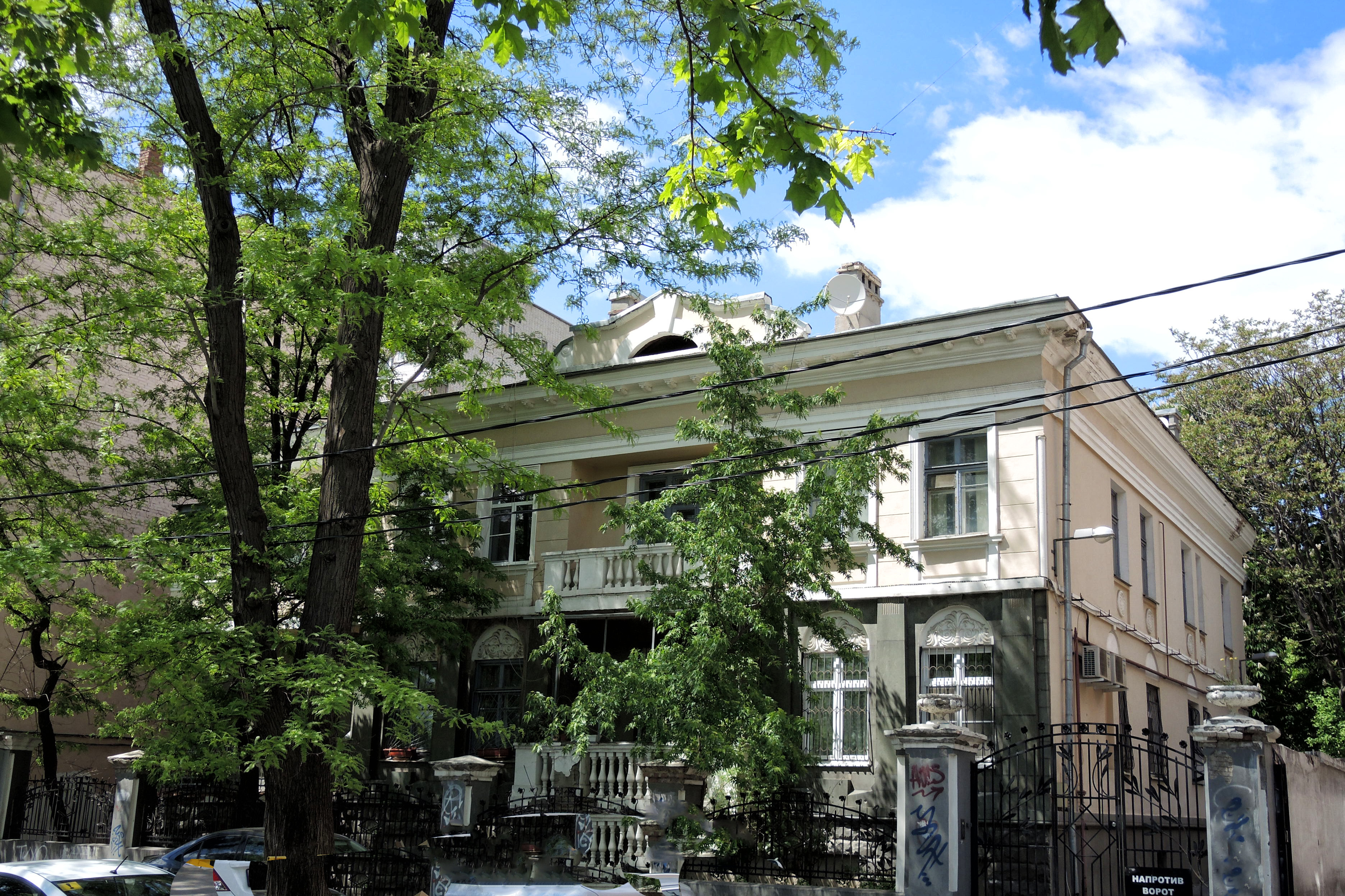
- 47.2244°N 39.7098°E
- Location: Rostov-on-Don, Pushkinskaya Street, house 79

The Suprunov Mansion (Russian: Особняк Супрунова) is a building in Rostov-on-Don located on Pushkinskaya Street (house 79). The mansion was built at the beginning of the 20th century and belonged to the Rostov grain-grower and a stud to Ivan Aleksandrovich Suprunov. The building has the status of an object of cultural heritage of regional value.

== History ==
I. A. Suprunov's mansion was built at the beginning of the 20th century. The city legend is connected with the construction of this house. Allegedly Suprunov during the trip to Italy decided to walk on the streets of Naples (according to another version — Genoa). The merchant was so struck by one refined mansion that he decided to buy by all means it and to bring to Rostov. The merchant addressed the host with this offer. The owner of the mansion refused in the beginning, but Suprunov offered it such large sum that he agreed. The mansion was sorted, shipped on the barge and transported to Rostov-on-Don. There the mansion was restored, Suprunov watched its assembly personally. However, there is an opinion that rumors about the Italian origin of the mansion were spread by Suprunov to draw attention to the business. According to another version which is written down according to Supernova's daughter, the house was built of local materials on the project brought by the merchant from the World Fair of 1910 in Brussels.

The mansion was revetted with marble and a majolica. Window openings had the semi-circular end, the central entrance was issued by the marble portal. In front of the house the front garden was located, and behind the mansion, a garden with the pool, revetted with a blue majolica was laid out. Along Pushkinskaya Street the fencing on a high socle with a shod lattice was established. In tax deeds, the house was estimated at 17 thousand rubles. Ivan Suprunov lived in the mansion with the family.

After the arrival of the Soviet power the mansion was nationalized, and Suprunov was arrested and was missing. In the former house of Suprunov day, nursery and the children's receiver were placed. The mansion suffered serious damage during the Great Patriotic War: marble facing, a roof, and parapets were lost. In the first half of the 1950s, the house was reconstructed in pseudoclassical style and transferred under housing. From an initial decor facing the first floor, dark marble remained.
