= Paramonov Mansion =

Mansion in Rostov-on-Don, Russia

Coordinates: 47.2269°N 39.7254°E

- Особняк Парамонова
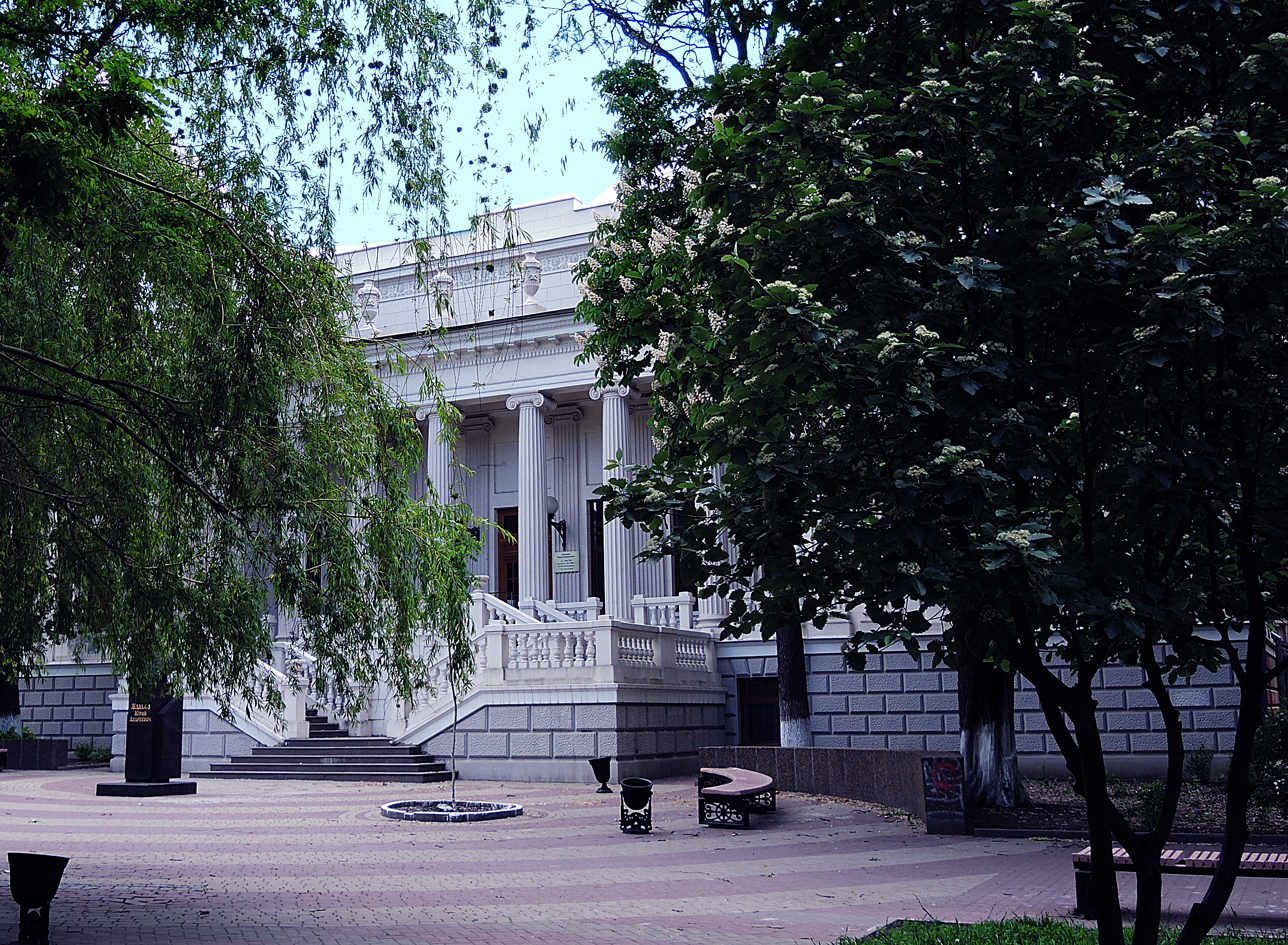
- Established: 1914
- Location: 148 Pushkinskaya Street, Rostov-on-Don
- Type: Mansion

The Paramonov Mansion (Russian: Особняк Парамонова) is a mansion in the city of Rostov-on-Don. It was built in 1914 for book publisher Nikolai Paramonov. The mansion was designed by architect Leonid Aeberg. The building is currently occupied by the Y. A. Zhdanov Scientific Library of Southern Federal University. The design is an example of Neoclassical architecture and is considered to be an architectural monument of federal importance.

== History ==
The mansion of the prominent book publisher Nikolai Paramonov was built in 1914. Leonid Aeberg was the designer and builder. Paramonov lived there afterward with his wife Anna and their children.

The building was confiscated by Soviet authorities at the beginning of 1918 and became the headquarters for the Rostov-Nakhichevan Revolutionary committee' headquarters. In May of the same year, after the expulsion of the Bolsheviks from Rostov, the mansion became headquarters for the Volunteer Army. At the end of 1918 a large fire severely damaged the building, and it was not repaired until 1923.

After repairs, it became the Recreation Center for Builders, which was soon replaced by the Institute of Blood Transfusion. In 1930s the building housed the Regional Museum of Local History.

During World War II, the mansion was damaged by fire several times, yet the walls survived. In 1947, local authorities decided to have the mansion repaired. Leonid Aeberg was again appointed to be in charge of this work. In 1952, the repairs were finished and the building was given to Rostov State University.

At the beginning of 21st century it became obvious that the mansion required another major repair. Long-term dampness in the basement had harmed the building and books that were kept there. In 2005 the facade was repaired. Reconstruction of the rest of the mansion began in autumn of 2013.

== Architecture ==
The mansion was built in the Neoclassical style. The main northern facade has a symmetrical composition. There is a six-column portico at the center of the Ionic order. The side facades are decorated with rows of pilasters. A four-meter two-sided staircase leads to the main entrance. The ground floor ends with a wide cornice.
