= Reznichenko House =

- Дом Резниченко
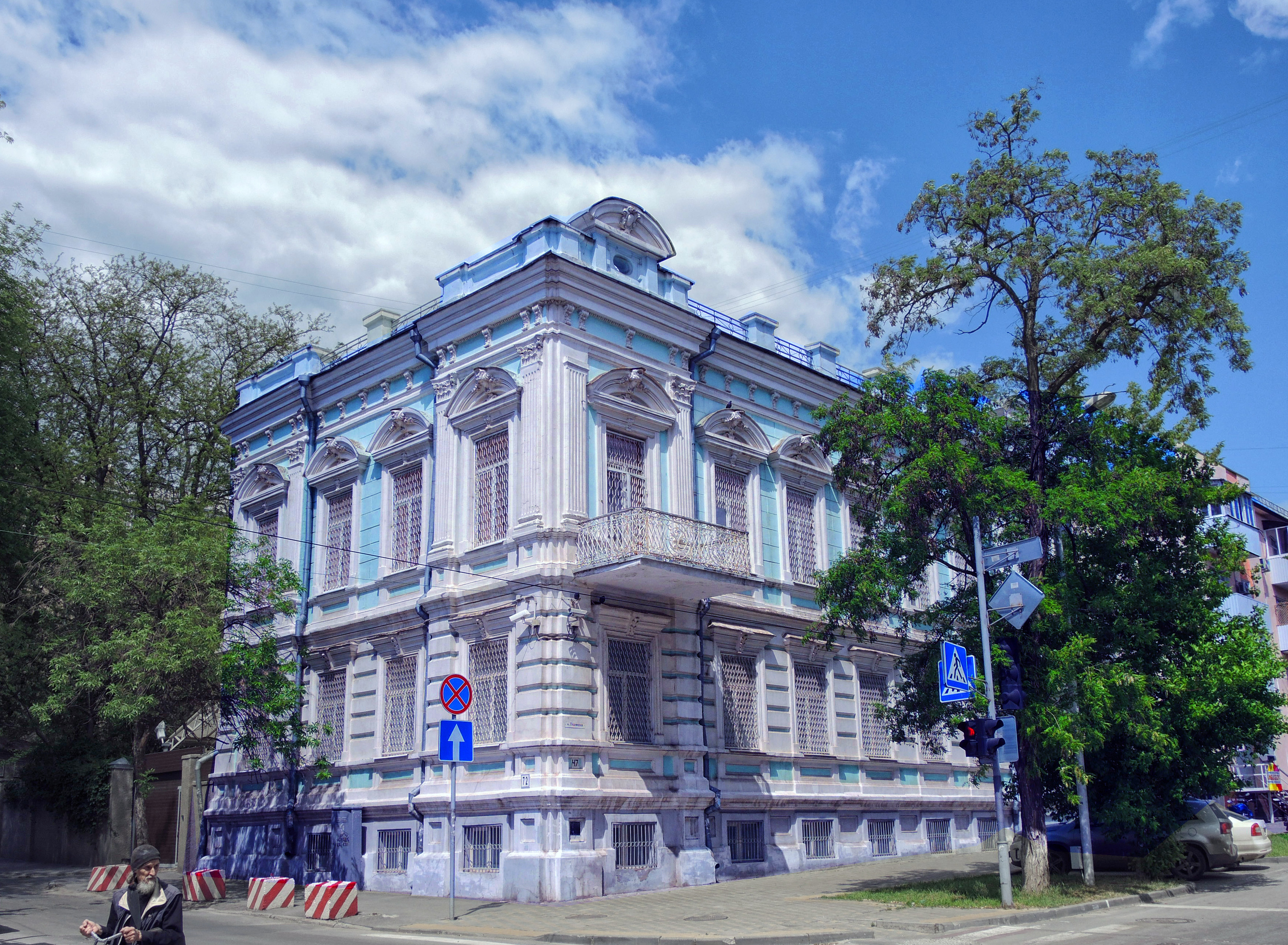
- Interactive map of Reznichenko House
- Location: 47 Pushkinskaya Street, Rostov-on-Don
- Coordinates: 47°13′23″N 39°42′13″E

The Reznichenko House (Russian: Дом Резниченко) is a building in Rostov-on-Don at 47 Pushkinskaya Street. The mansion was built in the late 1890s, presumably as a guest house for VIPs. The building has the status of an object of cultural heritage of regional significance.

== History and description ==
The house was originally owned by K. S. Reznichenko, though it later passed through several owners. In the early 1920s, the house was nationalized and transferred to the North Caucasus Military District. Apartments in the house were given to senior officers of the Red Army.

The two-storeyed house is built in the neo-baroque style, with its main facade facing Pushkinskaya Street. Horizontal partitioning of the building is achieved via projections between the floors and cornices. The first floor is rusticated. Window openings are framed by decorative platbands. Windows of the second floor are finished with arched sandricks with female heads. The walls are decorated by Corinthian pilasters. The facade of the building is completed by attics with pediments located on the sides. On the second floor there are balconies with decorative wrought iron gratings. The house has changed little from its original appearance, only the windows and bars with pedestals on the parapet were replaced.
