= Nikolai Reznichenko =

Soviet and Russian military officer (1952–2021)

- Native name: Николай Семёнович Резниченко
- Born: 23 March 1952; Kabardinskaya, Apsheronsky District, Krasnodar Krai, Russian SFSR, Soviet Union
- Died: 6 July 2021 (aged 69)
- Buried: Federal Military Memorial Cemetery
- Allegiance: Soviet Union; Russia
- Branch: Soviet Border Troops; Federal Border Service of the Russian Federation
- Service years: 1970–2003
- Rank: General-Polkovnik
- Awards: Order of Military Merit; Order of the Red Banner; Order of the Red Star; Order "For Personal Courage"

Nikolai Semyonovich Reznichenko (Russian: Николай Семёнович Резниченко; 23 March 1952 – 6 July 2021) was a Soviet and later Russian military officer who held a number of posts in the country's border forces, reaching the rank of general-polkovnik. His career culminated with the position of first deputy and chief of staff of the Federal Border Service of the Russian Federation.

== Early life and service ==
Reznichenko was born on 23 March 1952 in the village of Kabardinskaya, Apsheronsky District, in Krasnodar Krai, then part of the Russian SFSR, in the Soviet Union. He began his schooling in the village in 1959, and was elected secretary of the school's Komsomol organization. In 1970 he enrolled in the Alma-Ata Higher Border Command School, but in his second year he was transferred with his class to the Higher Border Military-Political School of the KGB, graduating in 1974. His active service following his graduation took him to many of the USSR's border districts, including the North-Western, Baltic, Transcaucasian and Central Asian Border Districts. He began as deputy head of a border outpost, rising to head of a border detachment. In 1979 he enrolled at the Frunze Military Academy, graduating in 1982.

== Combat service ==
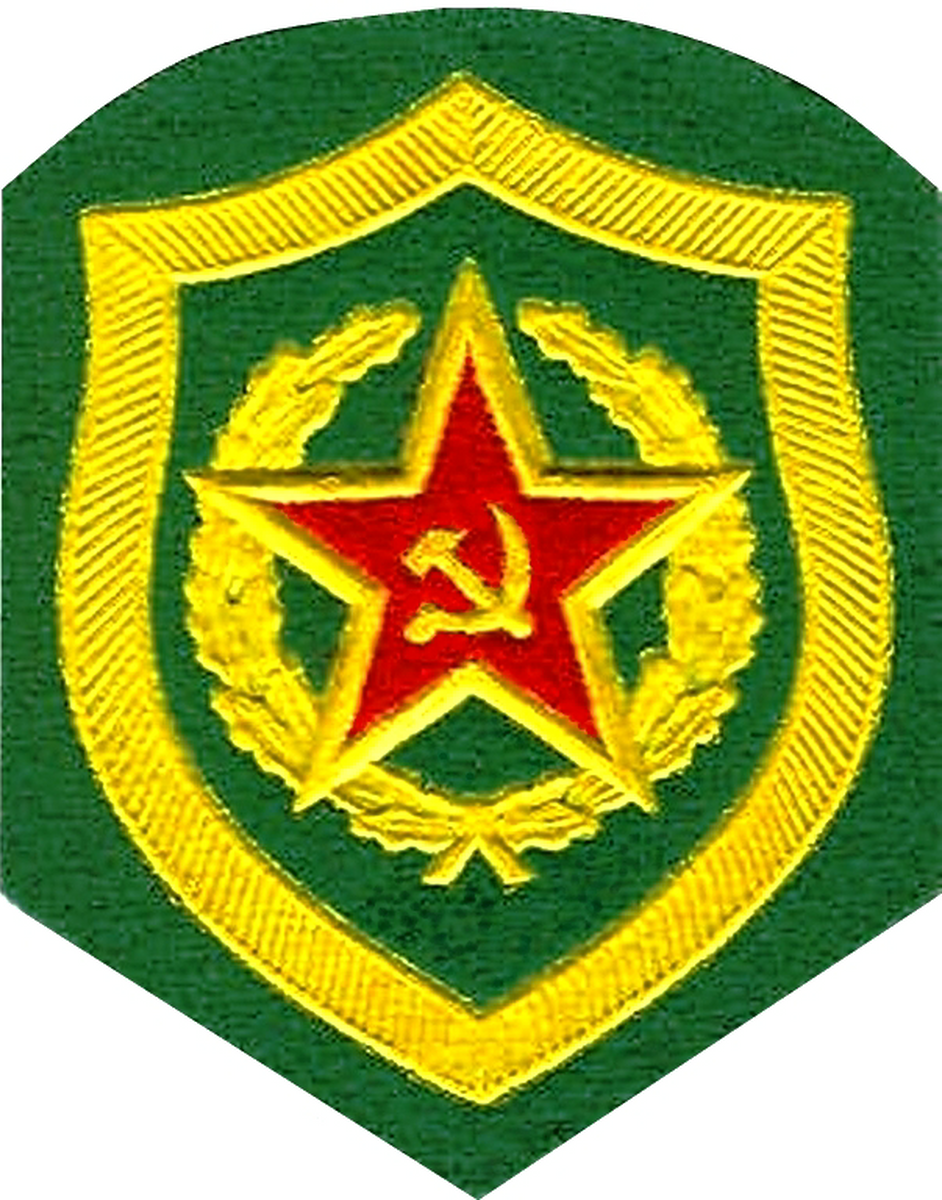
Patch of the Soviet Border Troops, with whom Reznichenko served during the first half of his career

Between 1984 and 1986 Reznichenko was part of the forces deployed into Afghanistan during the Soviet–Afghan War. He was involved in the fighting in 1985 around the city of Mazar-i-Sharif, when Soviet forces encircled and captured a large group of fighters, seizing a large quantity of weapons and ammunition. Reznichenko suffered a concussion during the fighting. In further fighting around the village of Barmazit, Soviet forces seized a truck carrying a large consignment of weapons and ammunition. For this operation, Reznichenko was awarded the Order of the Red Star. Over the period of his service in Afghanistan, Reznichenko was twice wounded, and received a concussion. In addition to the Order of the Red Star, he was also awarded the Order of the Red Banner, the Order "For Personal Courage", the Democratic Republic of Afghanistan's Order "For Courage" and various medals.

== Post-Soviet career ==
In 1991 Reznichenko was appointed deputy chief of staff of the Central Asian Border District, and spent between 1992 and 1994 studying at the Military Academy of the General Staff of the Armed Forces of Russia. Between then and 1999 he served as a deputy chief of directorate of the General Staff of the Federal Border Guard Service of Russia, and first deputy commander and chief of staff of the Kaliningrad Group of Border Troops, followed by the post of first deputy commander and chief of staff of the Caucasian Special Border District, and then head of the Group of Border Forces of Russia in Tajikistan. In 1999 Reznichenko was appointed first deputy director and chief of staff of the Federal Border Service of the Russian Federation, a post he held until his retirement in 2003.

== Later life and honours ==
Over his career Reznichenko reached the rank of general-polkovnik, and was awarded the Order of the Red Star, the Order of the Red Banner, and Order "For Personal Courage", as well as various medals. He was married, with two sons and two grandchildren. Both of his sons followed him into the border service, and served as officers.

Reznichenko died of COVID-19 on 6 July 2021, at the age of 69. He was buried in the Federal Military Memorial Cemetery on 10 July 2021.
