= Monument to Alexander Pushkin (Rostov-on-Don) =

Monument in Rostov-on-Don, Russia

Coordinates: 47°13′32″N 39°43′01″E

- Памятник А. С. Пушкину
- Interactive map of Monument to Alexander Pushkin
- Location: Rostov-on-Don, Rostov Oblast, Russia
- Material: bronze, granite
- Opening date: 1959
- Dedicated to: Alexander Pushkin

Monument to Alexander Pushkin in Rostov-on-Don is a statue in the center of Rostov-on-Don. It is situated at the intersection of Pushkinskaya Street and Voroshilov Avenue. The author of the monument is Gavriil Schultz (and the architect is Mihail Minkus). The monument was erected in 1959. Later, the square where it stands was decorated with lanterns of 19th century style. Pushkin monument is an object of cultural heritage of regional importance. It is also the first monument in Rostov-on-Don which is dedicated to literary topic.

The sculpture of the poet, designed in classical style, is made of bronze and stands on a high pedestal of red colour, which is made of granite.

In 1992, the Pushkin monument was listed to the register of architectural objects under state protection.

In 1999 the monument was renovated.

Every year on the day of his birth, which is on the six of June, residents of Rostov-on-Don and city guests lay flowers to the monument. Fans of his work gather around, and literary and poetry readings are arranged. The festivities are usually attended by representatives of associations of writers, members of public institutions in the field of culture, and high school students.

Monument to the renowned poet and writer appeared in the city for a reason. Pushkin visited Rostov-on-Don in 1820. During this time he was making a trip to the Caucasus, accompanied by General of the cavalry Nikolay Raevsky, who also was a hero of the Patriotic War of 1812 and a friend of the poet. During this journey the writer developed an interest in the history of the reign of Peter I and Catherine II, and uprisings led by Stepan Razin and Emelyan Pugachev. About these topics he wrote his most important works. The image of Rostov, the manners of its inhabitants made an impression on young Pushkin, who before had only been common to metropolitan community, and it also left a certain mark on his works.
