= Vladimir Kirshon =

Soviet playwright

Vladimir Mikhailovich Kirshon (Russian: Влади́мир Миха́йлович Киршо́н; 19 August [O.S. 6 August] 1902 – July 28, 1938) was a Soviet playwright, poet, publicist and screenwriter.

== Biography ==
Born in Nalchik in the Caucasus into the family of a lawyer, Kirshon served in the Red Army during the Russian Civil War and in 1920 joined the Communist Party, which sent him to the Sverdlov Communist University. As a young idealist, he was upset by the New Economic Policy, and this is reflected in his early plays.

He was an organizer of the Association of Proletarian Writers in Rostov-on-Don and in the North Caucasus, and from 1925 was one of the secretaries of the Russian Association of Proletarian Writers (RAPP) in Moscow. He was among the most radical literary functionaries of the day, and was one of the most relentless persecutors of Mikhail Bulgakov. His ideological fervor recommended him to Joseph Stalin, to whom he sent his work for approval. "When he was in favour, he could do no wrong: 'Publish immediately,' Stalin scrawled on Kirshon's latest article when returning it to Pravda's editor." His early plays Konstantin Terekhin (1926) and Rel'sy gudyat (Rails are Humming, 1927) "caused a sensation," but Khleb (Bread, 1931) "had but an ephemeral success." His later Chudesny splav (Miraculous Alloy, 1934) was still popular in the 1960s. At the beginning of 1937, however, Kirshon fell out of favour due to his close association with Leopold Averbakh, former head of RAPP and brother-in-law of Genrikh Yagoda. At a public meeting he was relentlessly attacked by Vsevolod Vishnevsky for associating with an "enemy of the people" and criticizing decisions of the Politburo; he attempted to defend himself, but was expelled from the Party and the Writers' Union and soon disappeared from Moscow.

On August 29, 1937, he was arrested along with other former RAPP leaders as Trotsky sympathizers and charged with membership in a "counterrevolutionary terrorist organization. He was sentenced to be shot on April 21, 1938, and executed at Butyrka prison in Moscow on July 28, 1938.

He was posthumously rehabilitated in 1955 and his plays were performed again.

== Works ==
- Emigratsiia i oppozitsiia [The Emigration and the Opposition]. Moscow: Moskovskii Rabochii, 1927.
