= The Rostov State Philharmonic Society =

- Ростовская государственная филармония (Russian)
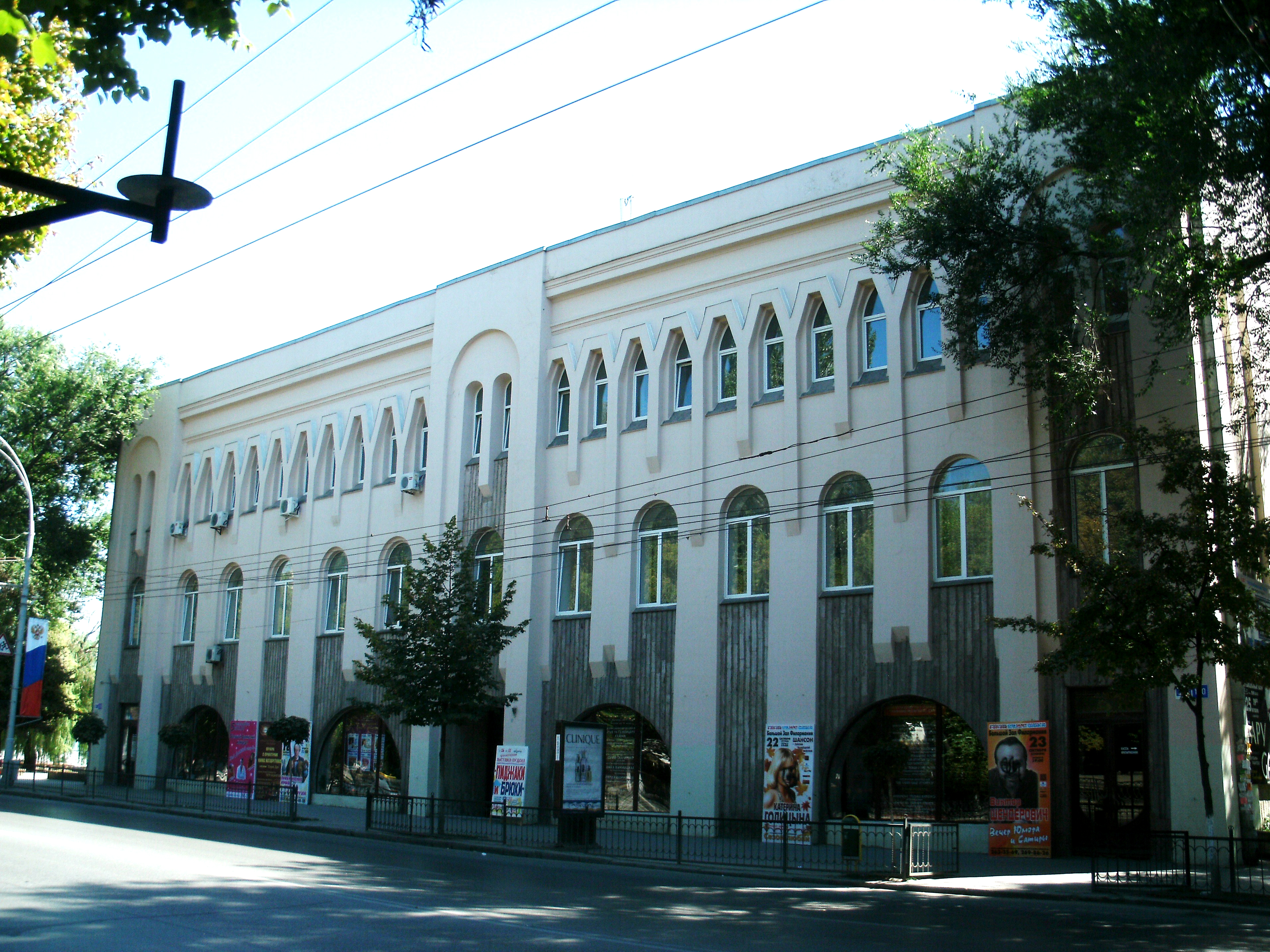

- Location within Russia
- Type: Concert hall
- Location: Rostov-on-Don, Rostov oblast Russia

History
- Built: 1935

The Philharmonic Society – philharmonic in the city of Rostov-on-Don.

Address: Rostov-on-Don, B. Sadovaya, 170.

== History ==
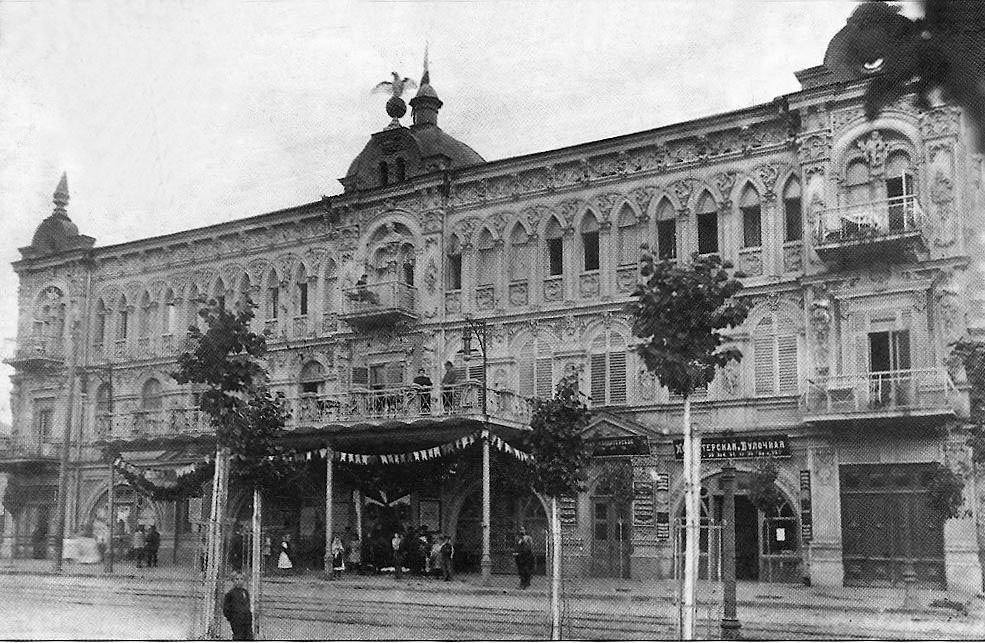
Cafe-theater "Mars". The main entrance of K. V. Charakhchians'house.

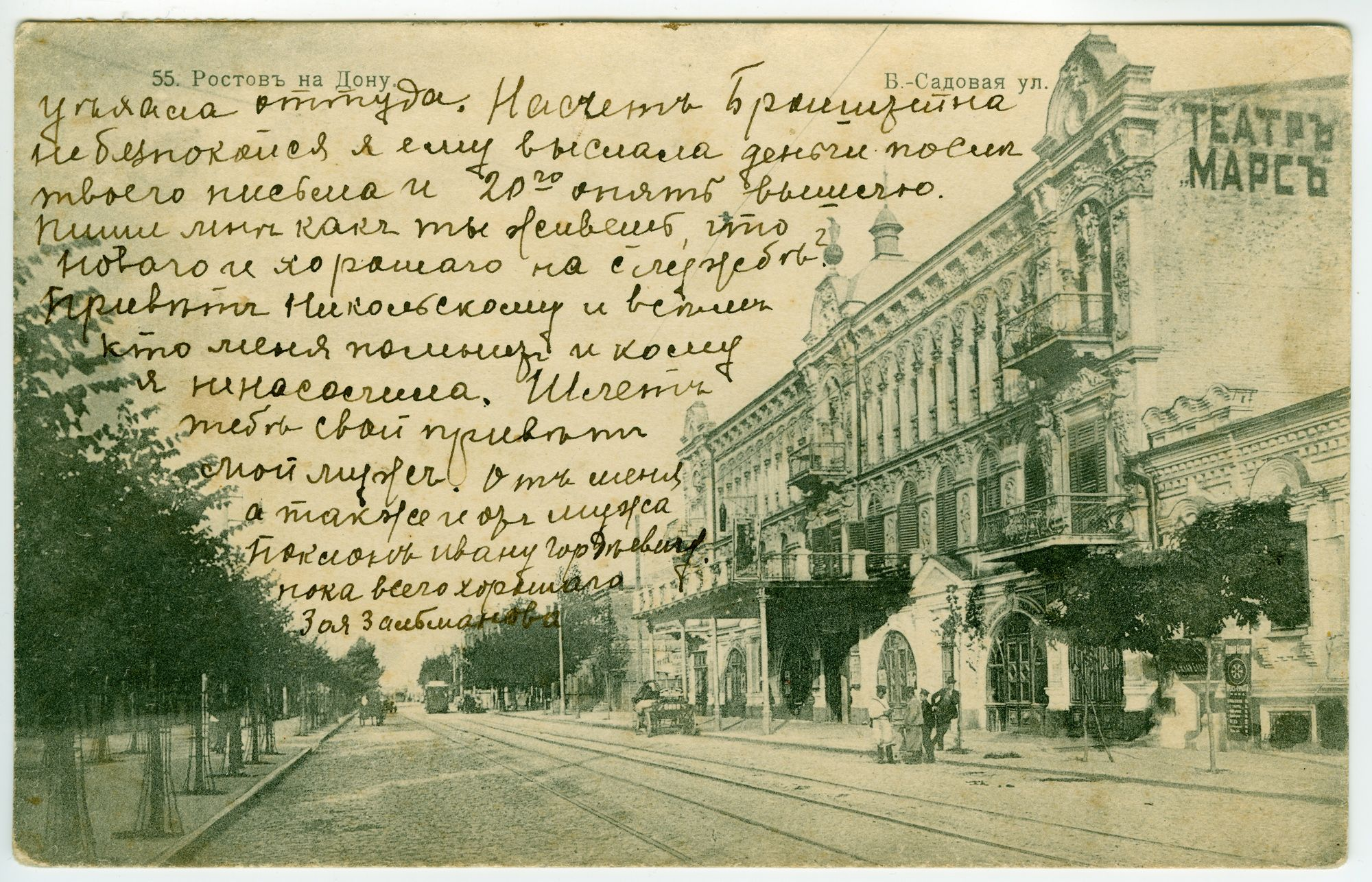
The main entrance of cafe-theater "Mars".

Until the mid-1930s, symphonic and chamber concerts in Rostov-on-Don were given by musical educational institutions and the State Radio Committee.

On March 21, 1935, according to the Decree of the Presidium of the Azov-Black Sea Executive Committee for "the establishment of musical services of the region", the Rostov State Philharmonic was established. The Rostov Academic Symphony Orchestra gives concerts in its composition for about 80 years. For the first decade, in addition to the symphony orchestra, the Song and Dance Ensemble of the « Don Cossacks» and the musical-literary lecture school were created at the beginning of the Great Patriotic War.

At the present time, musical collectives and soloists work in the Rostov Philharmonic, among them are national and honored artists of the Russian Federation, laureates and diplomats of All-Russian and international competitions. In the Rostov Philharmonic there are creative groups created in different years: the Department of Music and Literary Programs "Classic Concert", the State Concert Orchestra of Wind Instruments named after V. N. Ezhdika, the orchestra of Russian folk instruments "Don", the ensemble of Russian folk instruments "Dontsy", the variety jazz orchestra named after K. Nazarethova, show-group "Amazon".

== Conservatory building ==
A three-story brick house was built on in Rostov-on-Don (K. V. Charakhchants' apartment house) at the beginning of the 20th century. Balconies were arranged in the center of the building, above the front entrance and at the sides.

In February 1917 the building became the center of revolutionary events. After the February Revolution, there was the Rostov-Nakhichevan Soviet of Workers' Deputies, and then the Military Revolutionary Committee. In November 1917, the building was occupied by the headquarters for the preparation of an armed uprising against the Don government of Ataman Kaledin, who did not recognize the October revolution, who declared Don in a martial law and banned the export of bread and coal to the central regions of Russia.

In 1927 there was a club of metal workers in the building. Since 1935 the building housed the Rostov Philharmonic.

== Management ==
Currently, the Rostov State Philharmonic is headed by the General Director Oksana Ivanovna Yakovleva.
