= Subways (Rostov-on-Don) =

Underground walkways in Rostov-on-Don, Russia

- Подземные переходы (Ростов-на-Дону) (Russian)
- Location within Russia
- Type: Subway
- Location: Rostov-on-Don, Rostov oblast Russia

History
- Built: 1960s-1980s

Subways of Rostov-on-Don are pedestrian walkways which were built in the city between the late 1960s and the early 1980s. The construction works were carried out by the organization "Mostootryad № 10", whose workers for a short period of time were able to build the main underground passages of Rostov-on-Don, which citizens use in the 21st century for safe movement around the city. Mosaic panels were created to decorate the walls of the passages, which are known as one of the attractions of the city. One of the five Central underground passages of Rostov-on-Don is recognized as a cultural heritage site, information is being collected to give this status to other subways.

== History ==
=== 20th century ===
Most of the existing underground passages in Rostov-on-Don were built by the organization "Mostotryad № 10", the head of which was Georgy Ivanovich Byllo. The chief of the site of the construction organization was Alexander Gavrilovich Egorov. The organization was mainly engaged in the construction of bridges in the Caucasus and on the m-4, the construction of underground passages was given much less time. The project started in the late 1960s and early 1970s. The first underground passage was built from 1969 to 1970 near the building of the North Caucasian railway on Teatralnaya Square.

A little later, Georgy Ivanovich took the initiative to build a second underground passage, which was approved by the city authorities. So the construction of the second underground passage began, which is now at the intersection of Bolshaya Sadovaya Street and Kirovsky Prospekt. George Billo also suggested decorating the transition walls with mosaics. After this, the construction of underground transitions began in the Leninsky district. From 1972 to 1973, two underground passages were built. One is located along Budennovskiy Avenue and Moskovskaya Street, the second one is along Budennovskiy Avenue and Bolshaya Sadovaya Street. It was assumed that the underground passage would be built near the modern Central market. But the construction was postponed due to various unforeseen circumstances. Therefore, the construction of another object — the transition on Budennovsky Avenue - Bolshaya Sadovaya street was started. On Bolshaya Sadovaya street, which at that time was called Engels Street, near the Central Department store, traffic was quite difficult due to the large number of pedestrians. To unload the route it was necessary to build a tunnel. At the same time, the organization "Mostotryad" engaged in the improvement of the territory of the square near the conservatory — there was created a fountain with a bronze woman. New underground passages were decided to decorate with the help of artistic elements. Because of the financial nuances the builders decided to do it without attracting members of the Union of Artists, and use the services of mosaic master Yuri Palshintsev. He and a whole team of tilers began to work for the design of transitions. The construction of underground transitions in Rostov-on-Don was led by deputy George Billy — Viktor Stepanovich Zurabyantsev. They found a solution to use ceramic tiles to decorate the walls in the city's crossings. In one of them, which is located along Budennovskiy Prospekt - Bolshaya Sadovaya Street, the floor was created with a difference. This was due to the fact that during the digging of the foundation pit a wooden oak conduit was found. The historians who examined the construction came to the conclusion that it dates back to the founding of Rostov-on-Don. It was decided to keep the water line underground in its original form, which affected the design of the floor. In 1978, a large crossing was made along Voroshilovsky Prospekt - Bolshaya Sadovaya Street. The construction of crossings on Lenin Square and the People's Militia took place. The last was built underground passage to the Karl Marx square in 1983–1984. After this, the construction work to create underground transitions in Rostov-on-Don ceased.

=== 21st century ===
In the autumn of 2014 in Rostov-on-Don construction of another underground passage began on Oktyabrskaya square. The first entrance to the tunnel should be located on the side of the bus station, the second is near the flower market, near the park named after Nikolai Ostrovsky. The deadline for completion was June 10, 2015.

At the end of December 2015, in the passage along Voroshilovsky Prospekt and Bolshaya Sadovaya Street, repairs were started.

The passage, which is located on Budennovsky Avenue and on Moskovskaya street, was recognized as an object of cultural heritage. In March 2016, work began on the drafting of a normative legal act, in the presence of which the object will appear on the list of objects of cultural heritage of the Rostov region. The other four pedestrian crossings have not received such status. This refers to the transitions located along Voroshilovsky Prospekt and Sadovaya Street, Budennovskiy Avenue and Sadovaya Street, in the Universitetskiy Lane and Sadovaya Street, along Kirovsky Avenue and Sadovaya Street. The reason for the refusal to recognize them as objects of cultural heritage was the date of their creation - with these moments less than 40 years.

68 million rubles were allocated from the city budget for the construction of an underground pedestrian crossing on Sholokhov Avenue. The width of the crossing is 4 meters, the height is 2.3 meters, and the length is 27 meters. There are two-way stairways. The construction was conducted taking into account the floor heating. Also, the builders took care of the artistic design of the underground passage. On the walls there were photographs of the times of the Great Patriotic War, which were adapted for ceramic tiles. The subjects of design were chosen by citizens.

As of September 2016 in Rostov-on-Don, the construction of new underground transitions began. Initially, the transition to the prospect of Nagibin began to be built. At first the crossing on Nagibin Avenue The second underground passage was built at the intersection of Sobornoye Lane and Bolshaya Sadovaya Street. Its width is 8 meters. Many of the transitions in the city began to be repaired — at the end of 2016 it was planned to repair two underground passages. In the future, it was planned to develop a project to overhaul the crossing along Bolshaya Sadovaya Street - Nakhichevansky Lane.

In November 2016, the mosaic panels, which are located in the underground passages, were washed and cleaned by volunteers from among the citizens.

Underground passage to the area of Chemists as of March 2017 is in an emergency condition, although several years ago it was overhauled.

== Construction process ==
From a technological point of view, the construction of such underground transitions is not particularly difficult. It is necessary to excavate the excavation pit in an open way so that it is located on one half of the roadway. Then there is installation of shaped reinforced concrete structures. The floor slab and waterproofing are installed. The same principle is used to build another part of the road. The construction of underground transitions in Rostov-on-Don provided for the installation of reverse traffic lights, the traffic flowed along the narrow roadway. The main part of the construction of the transition took 6 months, then the finishing work was carried out.
