= Don-Plaza =

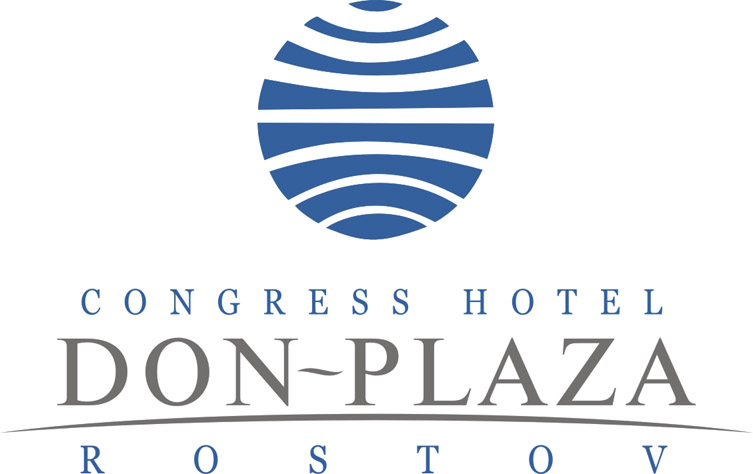

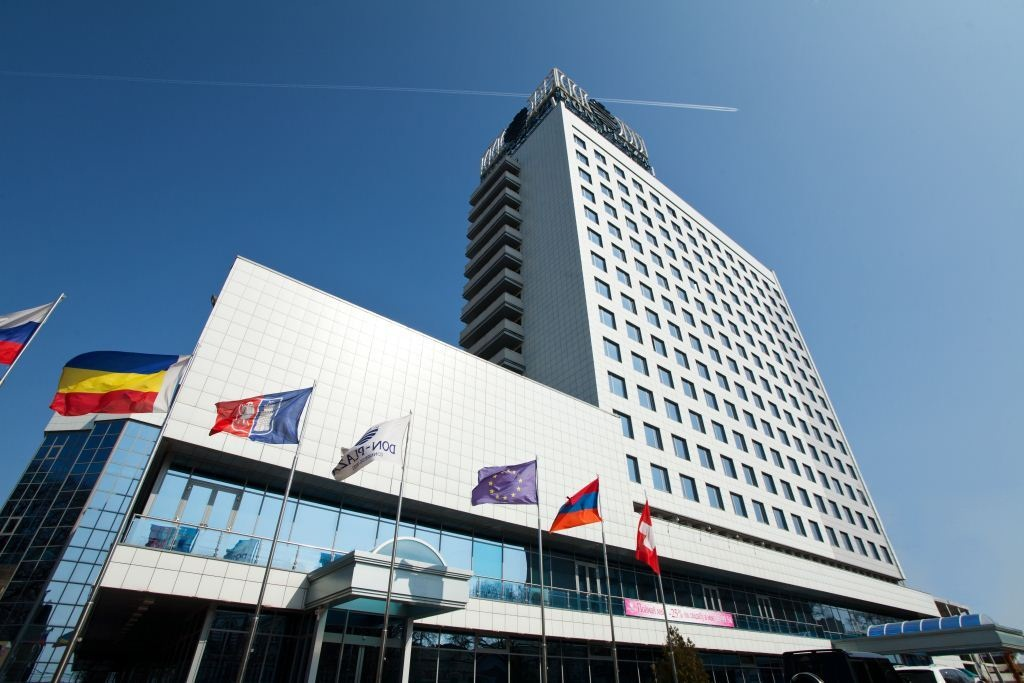

General information
- Location: Rostov-on-Don, Rostov Oblast, Russia, Bolshaya Sadovaya Street (Rostov-on-Don), 115
- Coordinates: 47°13′34″N 39°44′03″E
- Opening: July 17, 1973

Design and construction
- Architect: V. I. Simonovich

Other information
- Number of rooms: 254

Website
- Official website

Don-Plaza — a four-star hotel in the center of Rostov-on-Don.

== History ==
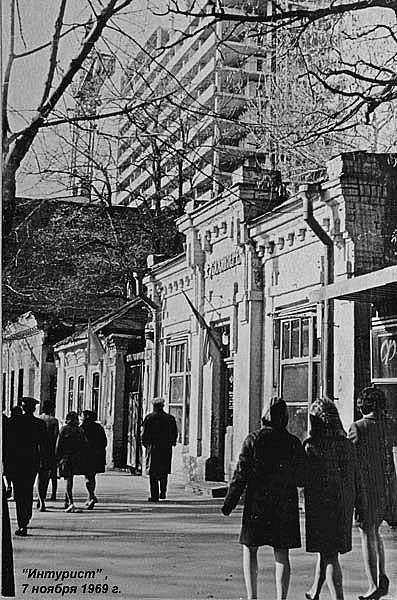
Building of the hotel "Intourist", 7 November 1969

The history of the hotel "Intourist" begins on July 1, 1954, when, on the orders of the Minister of Foreign Trade of the USSR No. 326 Rostov-on-Don, the agency VAO "Intourist" was organized, to which "a meeting of foreign delegations and individual foreigners arriving in the city, and also performance of other tasks of the Center for servicing foreign clients" was entrusted. There were only 3 people in the agency staff: a manager, a driver and an inspector.

By 1955, the influx of visitors to the city had increased to 3,000 people, coming mainly from Bulgaria, France, the United States and the GDR. Despite the growing need for hotel services, there was only one “Don” hotel in the city, where 65 hotel rooms were allocated to foreign guests, only 8 rooms were equipped with bathrooms.

In 1966, the Department for Foreign Tourism under the Council of Ministers of the approved technical documentation for the construction of the hotel "Intourist" in Rostov-on-Don. In October 1972, the building of the complex was to be completed. In the same month in the newspaper "Evening Rostov" an advertisement was published on the employment for 12 professionals to Intourist.

17 July 1973 is the birthday of the hotel "Intourist" in Rostov. On this day, the State Commission adopted the 17-storey hotel complex "Intourist" at 115 Engels Street (now Bolshaya Sadovaya Street). The order of Glavintourist No. 184 of July 26, 1973 declared: "Transfer the hotel Intourist with 507 places and a power supply unit for 792 places to balance of the Intourist branch in the region. To consider the hotel "Intourist" in Rostov-on-Don put into operation on July 17, 1973."

In 1974, the author of the project L.Pushkova, the chief architect V.I. Simonovich and the head of UNR-112 Y.Y. Kostenko were awarded the State Prizes of the RSFSR.

As a result of the privatization of state property in 1992, JSC "Intourist in the city of Rostov-on-Don" was established on the basis of the hotel complex. The overall economic decline in the country has had a negative impact on tourism activity. The flow of foreign guests has decreased significantly, and the hotel complex has increasingly deteriorated. The idea of reforming Intourist into an office building was becoming more and more relevant. The emerging economic stabilization in the region has determined the reorientation of the hotel to business tourists. In 2004, Intourist experienced reconstruction, as a result of which conference halls and a business center appeared in the hotel. In 2007, the hotel, named Don-Plaza, received the official certificate of Rostourism for the assignment of the category "4 stars".

== Description ==
The hotel building is a high-rise sixteen-story building made of reinforced concrete, lined with aluminum, plastic, acoustic tiles.

The Don theme can be traced in the interior design of the hotel. The decoration of rooms and halls is made using expensive materials and products such as wood, marble, aluminum, tapestries, decorative grilles, carpet floors, coffered ceilings. The rooms were furnished with Finnish furniture and decorated with original lamps. The interior design was attended by sculptors Y. Aleksandrov, I. Kazansky and artists Andronov and Egorshin. Due to the high level of subterranean waters resulting from leaks from the sewer network and the Rostov reservoir, the foundation of the building is periodically flooded.

== "Don-Plaza" company ==
The company "Don-Plaza" includes the management company, the hotel Don Plaza, the lobby bar "Amadeus", the restaurant Mein-Herz, the men's club "Hypnosis". Under the management of the company, the international congress center Hyatt Regency Rostov Don-Plaza is under construction — a complex of buildings with a total area of about 100 thousand square meters.
