= Ter-Abramyan House =

Building in Leninsky, Rostov-on-Don, Russia

Coordinates: 47°13′18.4″N 39°42′51″E

The Ter-Abramyan House
- Дом Тер-Абрамяна
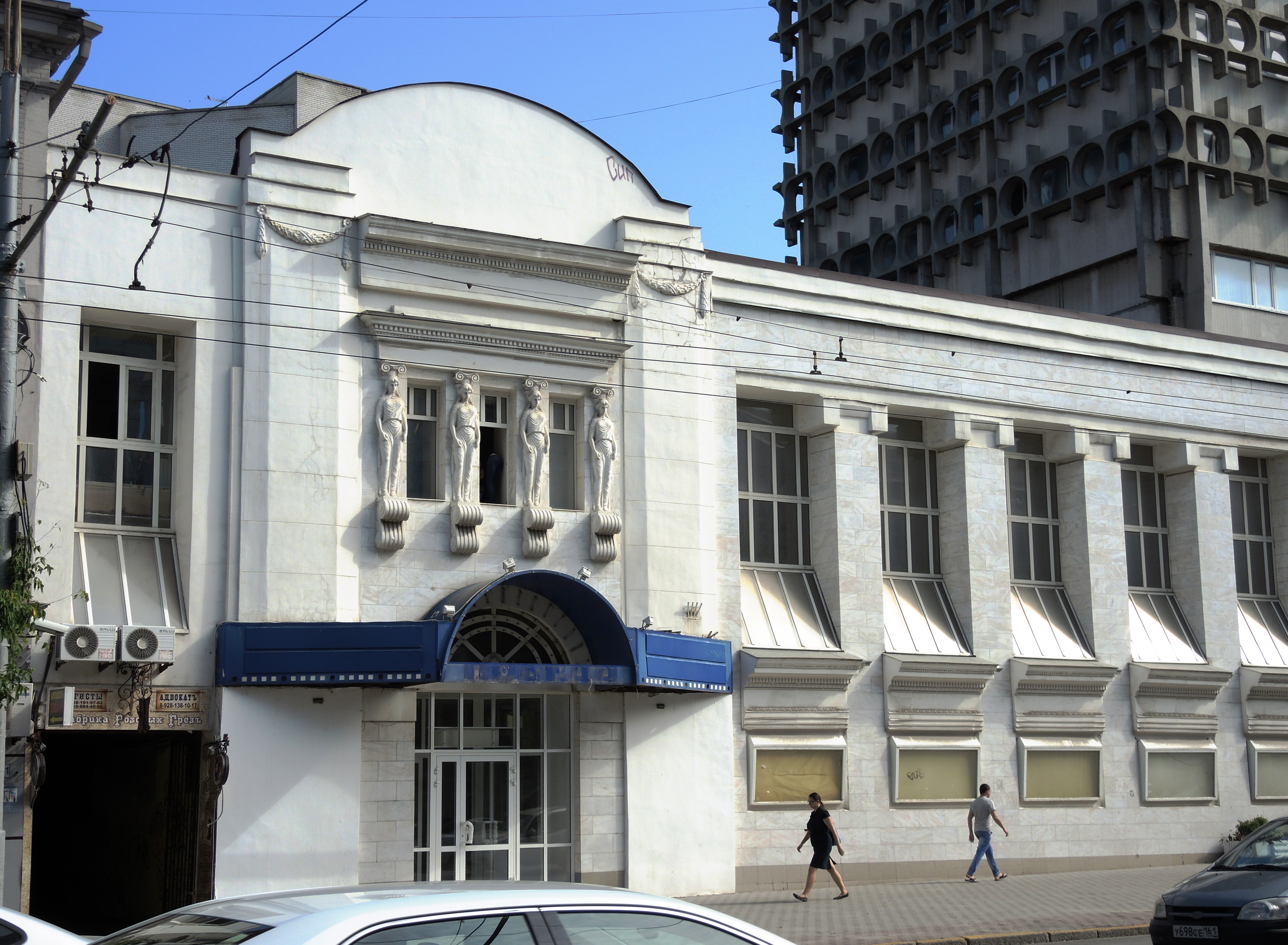
- Ter-Abramyan House (2015)

General information
- Status: An object of cultural heritage
- Architectural style: Art Nouveau style
- Address: Leninsky District, 51 Bolshaya Sadovaya street
- Town or city: Rostov-on-Don
- Country: Russia
- Year(s) built: 1886

Design and construction
- Architect(s): Nikolay Matveyevich Sokolov

The Ter-Abramyan House (Russian: Дом Тер-Абрамяна, romanized: Dom Ter-Abramyana) is an edifice in the Leninsky District of Rostov-on-Don, Russia. The house is located at 51 Bolshaya Sadovaya street (Russian: Большая Садовая улица, 51). It was a revenue house. The building is also considered to be an object of cultural heritage.

== History ==
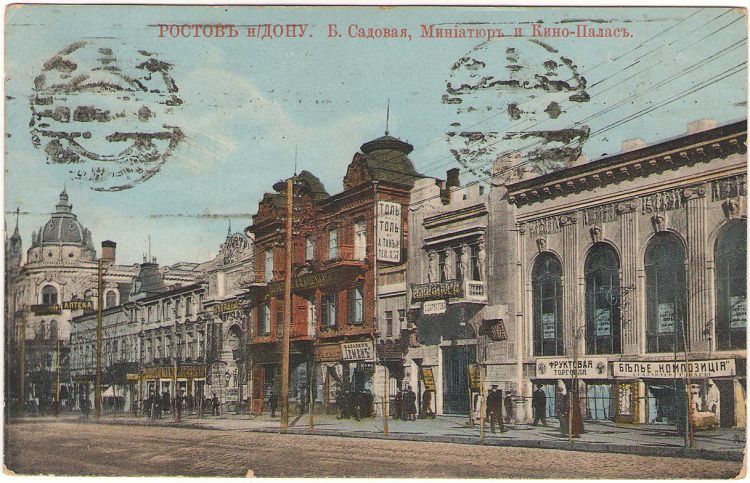
The Ter-Abramyan House (on the right) in the early 1900s

Rostov businessman Ivan Abramovich Ter-Abramyan owned bookstore and engaged in publishing activities. His printing-office and publishing house were accommodated in rented premises. He needed own building. In the last quarter of the 19th century Ter-Abramyan decided to build a house.

The Ter-Abramyan House was built in 1886. It was designed by famous Rostov architect Nikolay Matveyevich Sokolov. Dwellings in the building were rented. Ter-Abramyan printing-office worked at the ground floor. It issued books, calendars, newspapers and other. Along with the printing-office Donskaya pchela (Russian: Донская пчела, literally Don bee) newspaper editorial office worked. Also shops and photo studios, where worked photographers: Isakovich, G. A. Shifrin, B. P. Mishchenko, occupied the ground floor. Vechrneye vremya (Russian: Вечернее время, literally Evening time) newspaper editorial office was located in the Ter-Abramyan House in 1918.

After the death of Ivan Ter-Abramyan the house and the printing-office came into possession of his son Aram Ivanovich Ter-Abramyan. 50 peoples were working on six typewriters and 15 printing machines in the printing-office in 1910. The Ter-Abramyan House was nationalized after the establishment of the Soviet rule in 1920. Flats were transformed into communal apartments.

== Description ==
The Ter-Abramyan House was designed in the Art Nouveau style. The facade above the entrance is decorated with four draped female figures (caryatids) as supporting Ionic pilasters. The left side is crowned with a rounded frontal.
