= Bolshaya Sadovaya Street (Rostov-on-Don) =

Main street in Rostov-on-Don, Russia

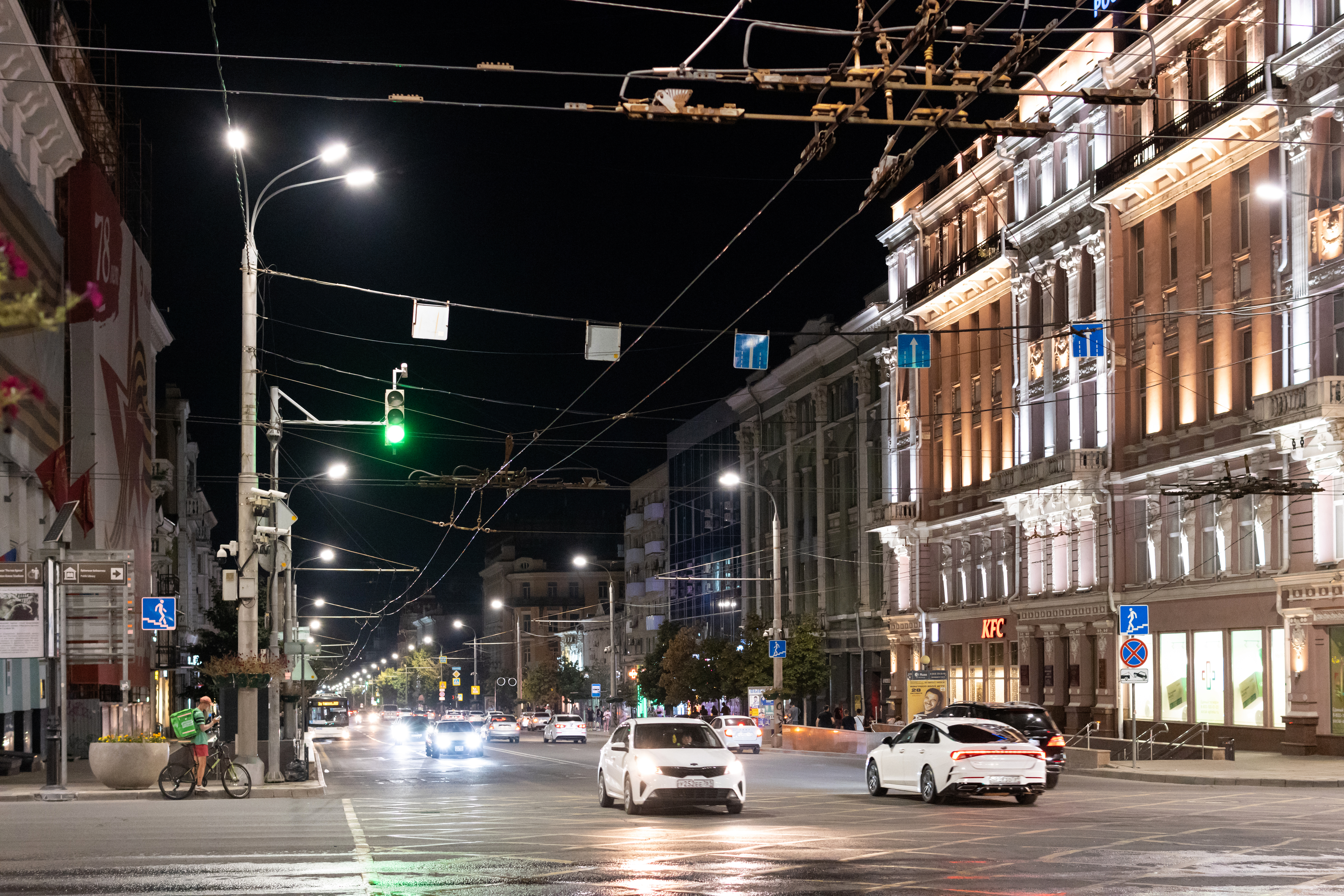
- Bolshaya Sadovaya Street
- Native name: Большая Садовая улица (Russian)
- Length: 3.79 km (2.35 mi)
- Location: Rostov-on-Don, Russia
- Coordinates: 47°13′16″N 39°42′45″E

Bolshaya Sadovaya Street or Big Garden Street (Russian: Большая Садовая улица) is the main street in Rostov-on-Don. Rostov City Hall, Rostov State Musical Theater, Southern Federal University, Chernova House and other notable buildings are located on this street. The street is parallel to the Don River.

== History ==
The street was formed in the late 18th century. At the beginning of the 19th century, some gardens appeared along the street. Therefore, the street was named Bolshaya Sadovaya (Big Garden Street). In the late 19th century, it became the central street of the city. A lot of banks, hotels, shops and private houses were built there at that time. In 1901 the first electric tram was launched in the street.

In Soviet times, the street was named after Friedrich Engels. During the World War II, many houses of the street were destroyed.

== Notable buildings and structures ==
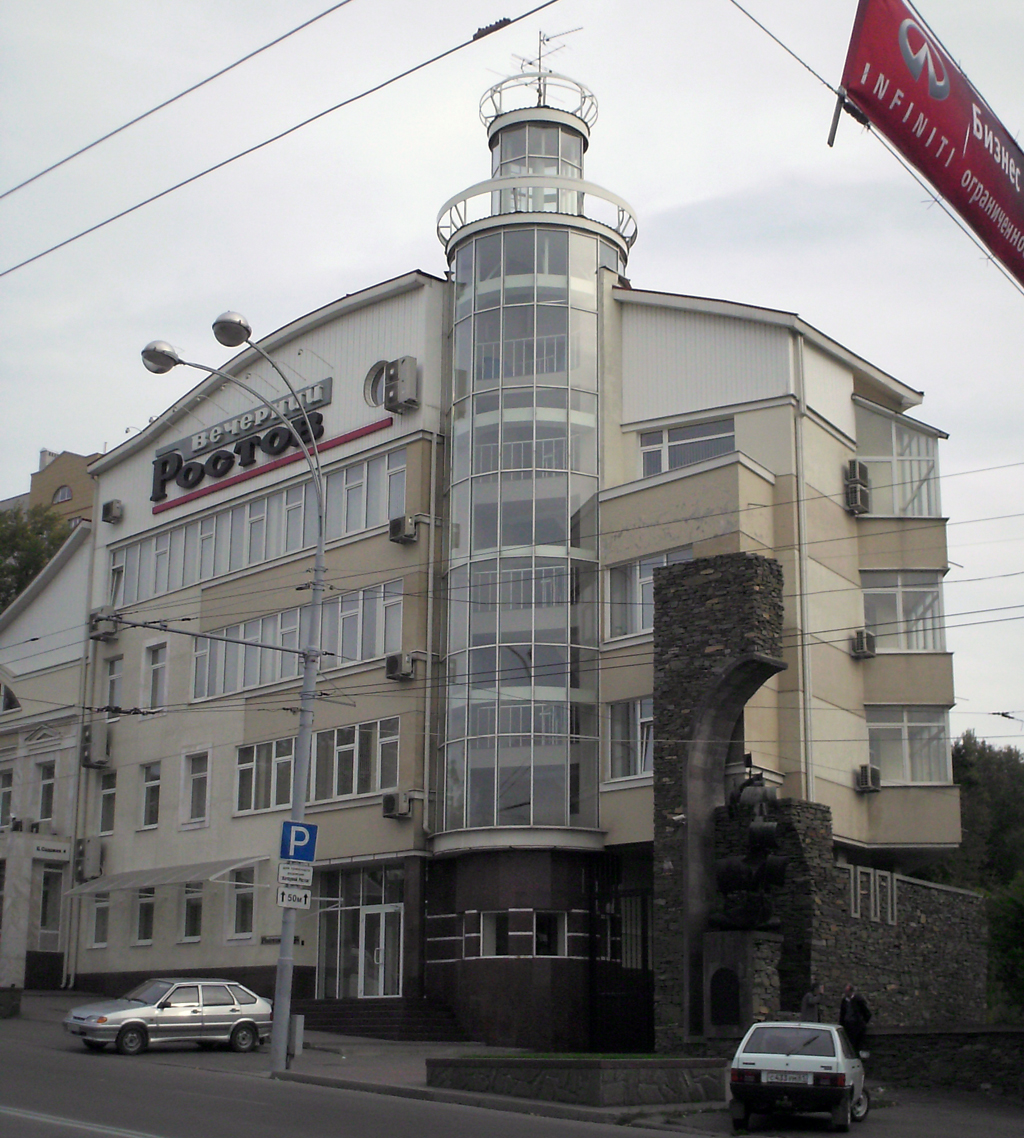
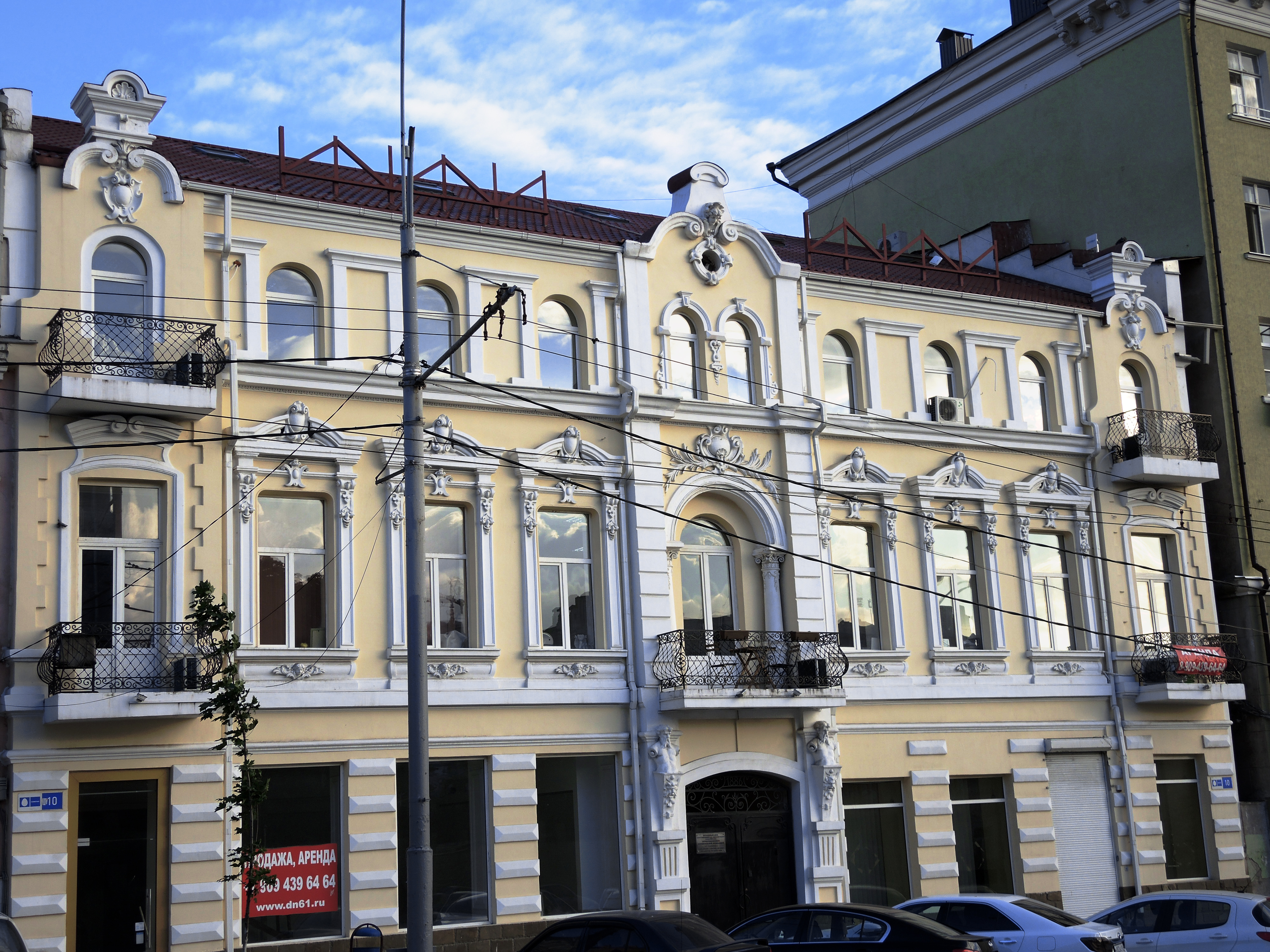
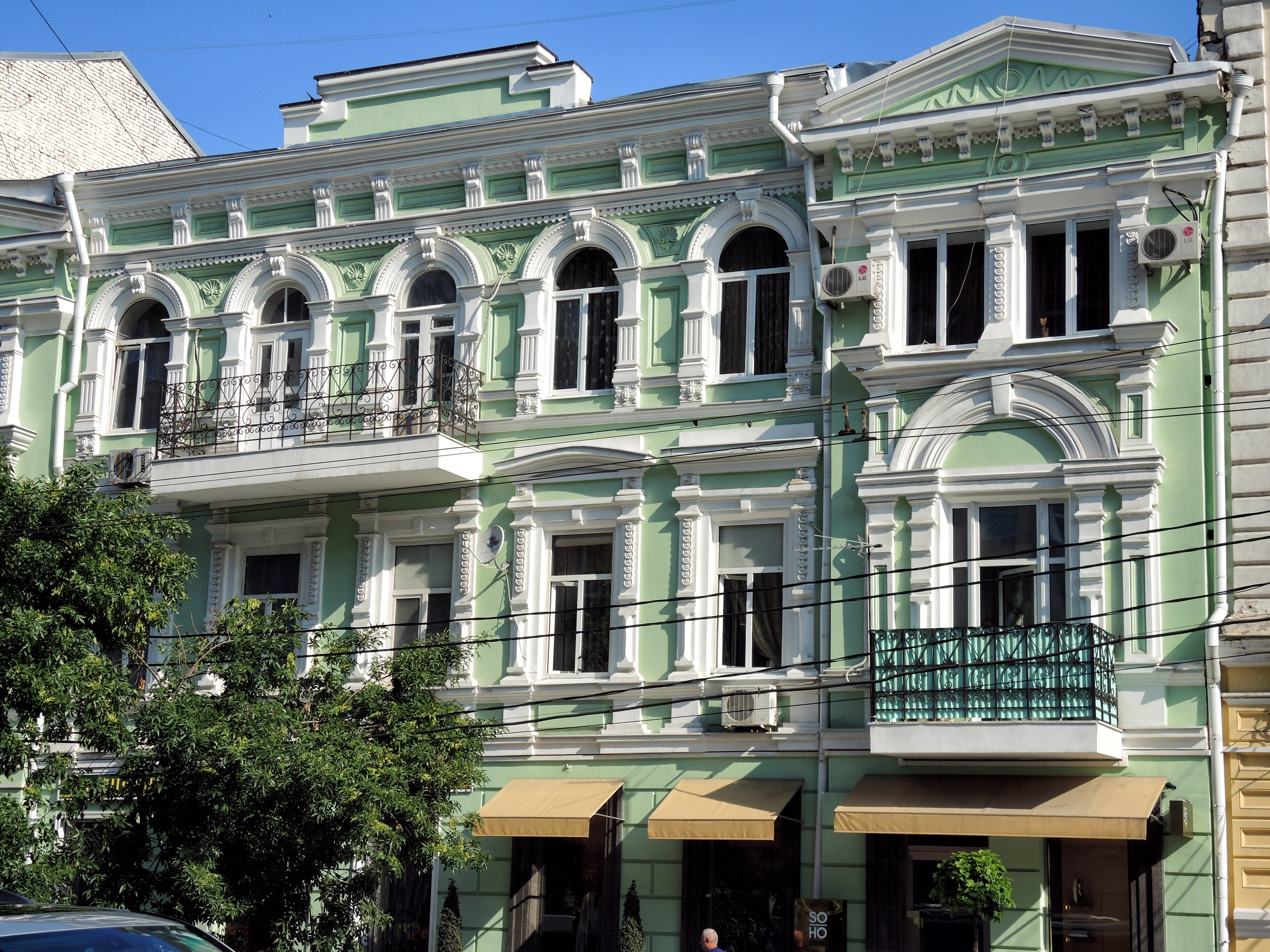
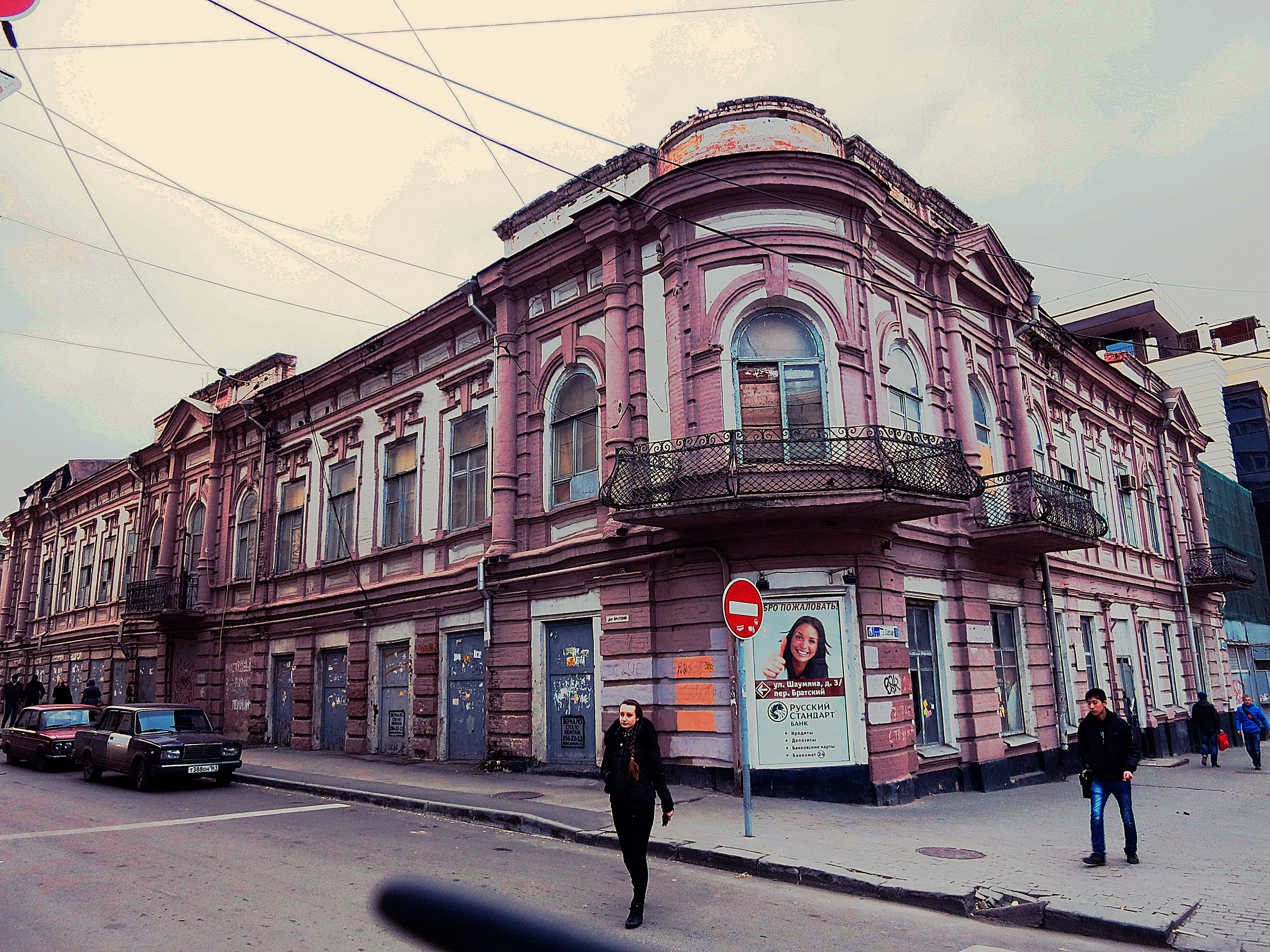
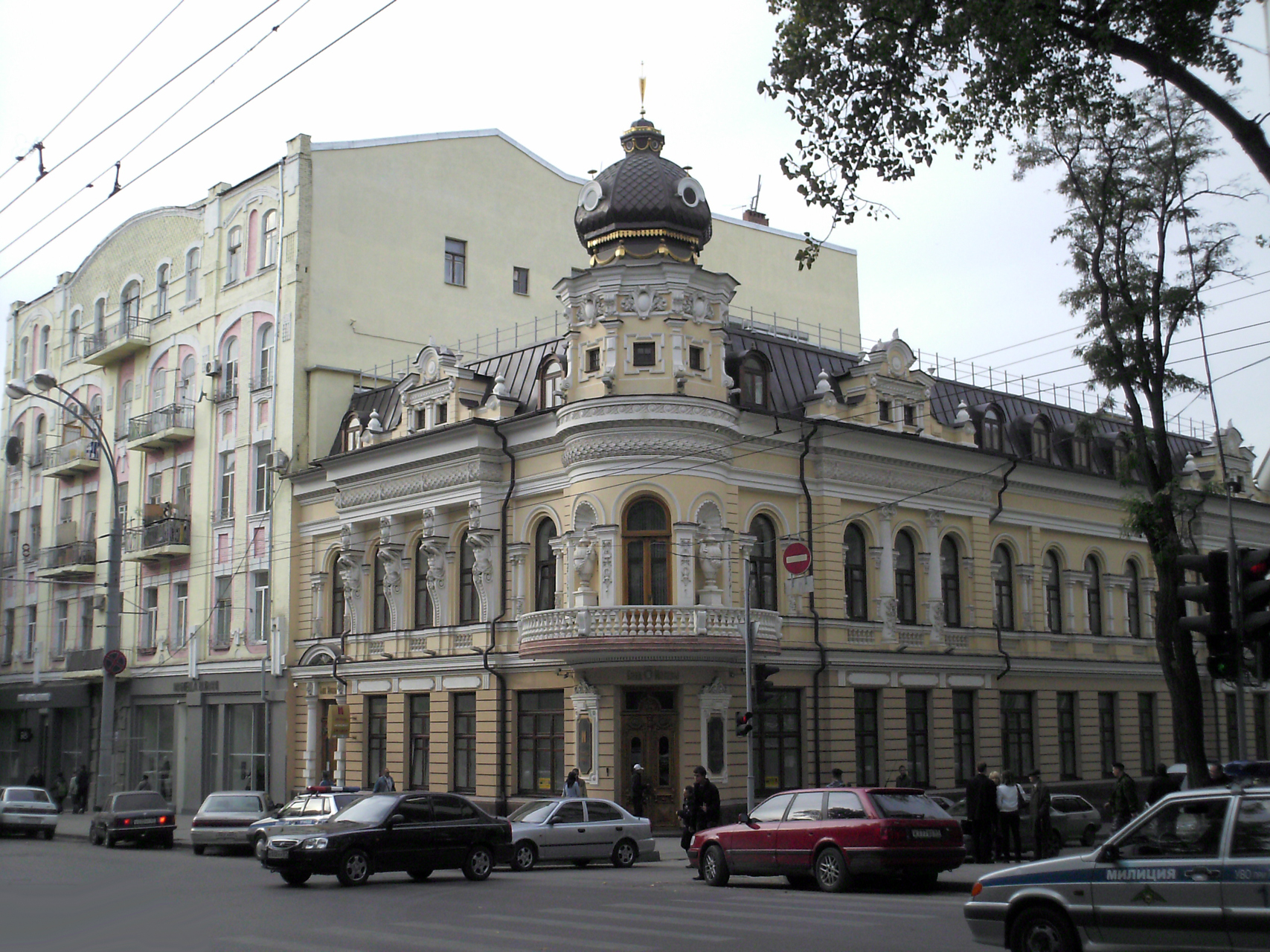
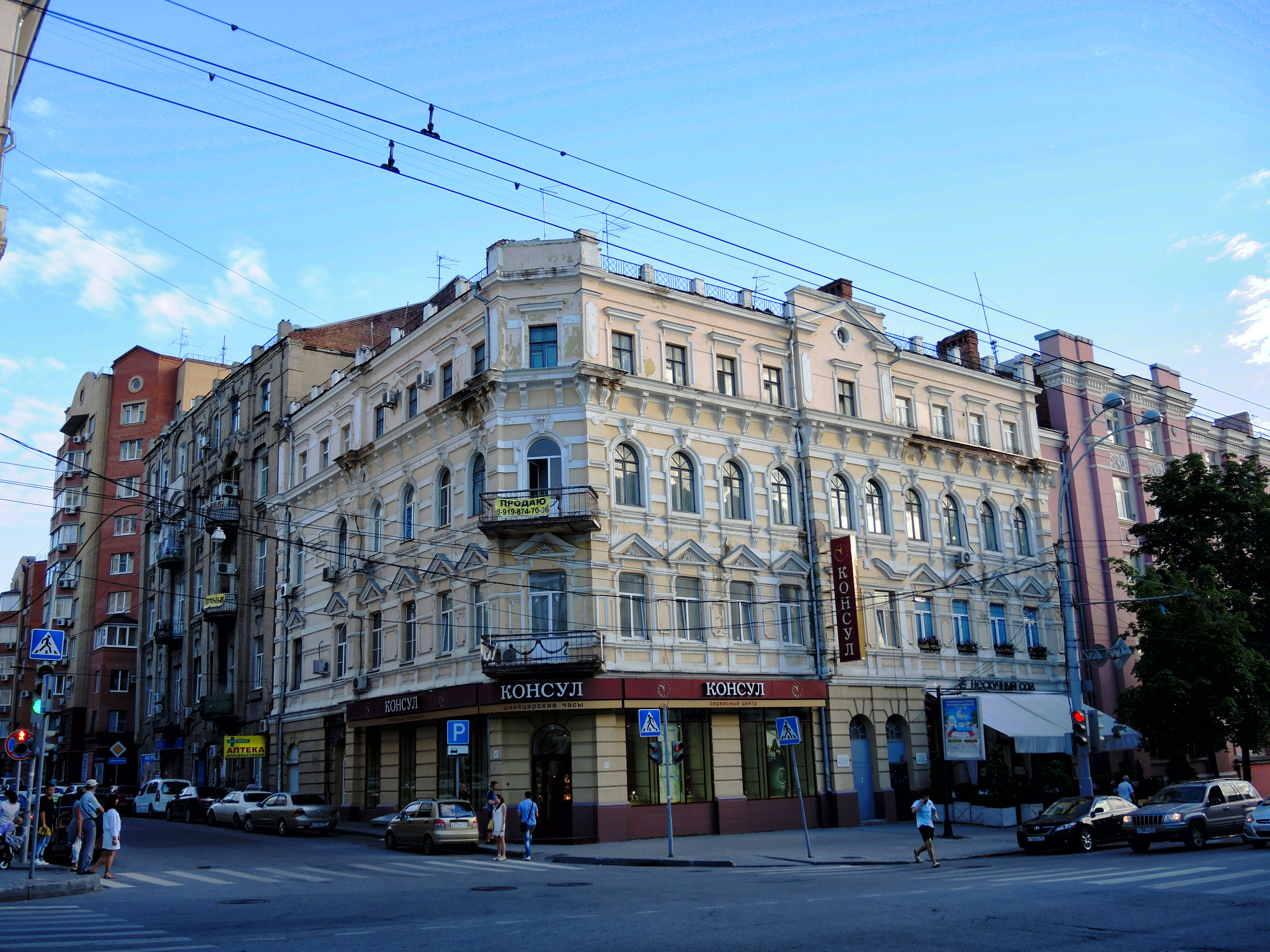
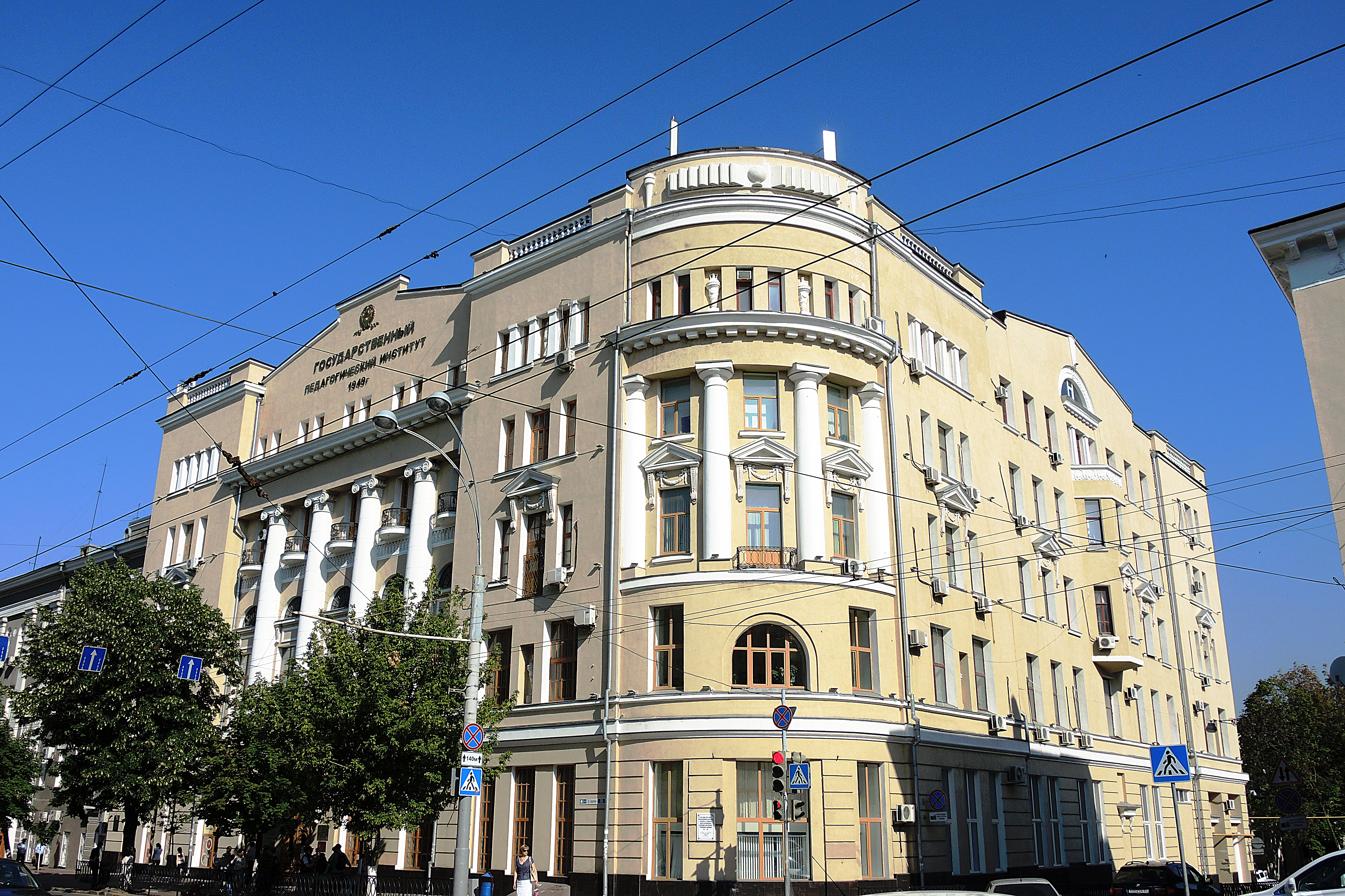
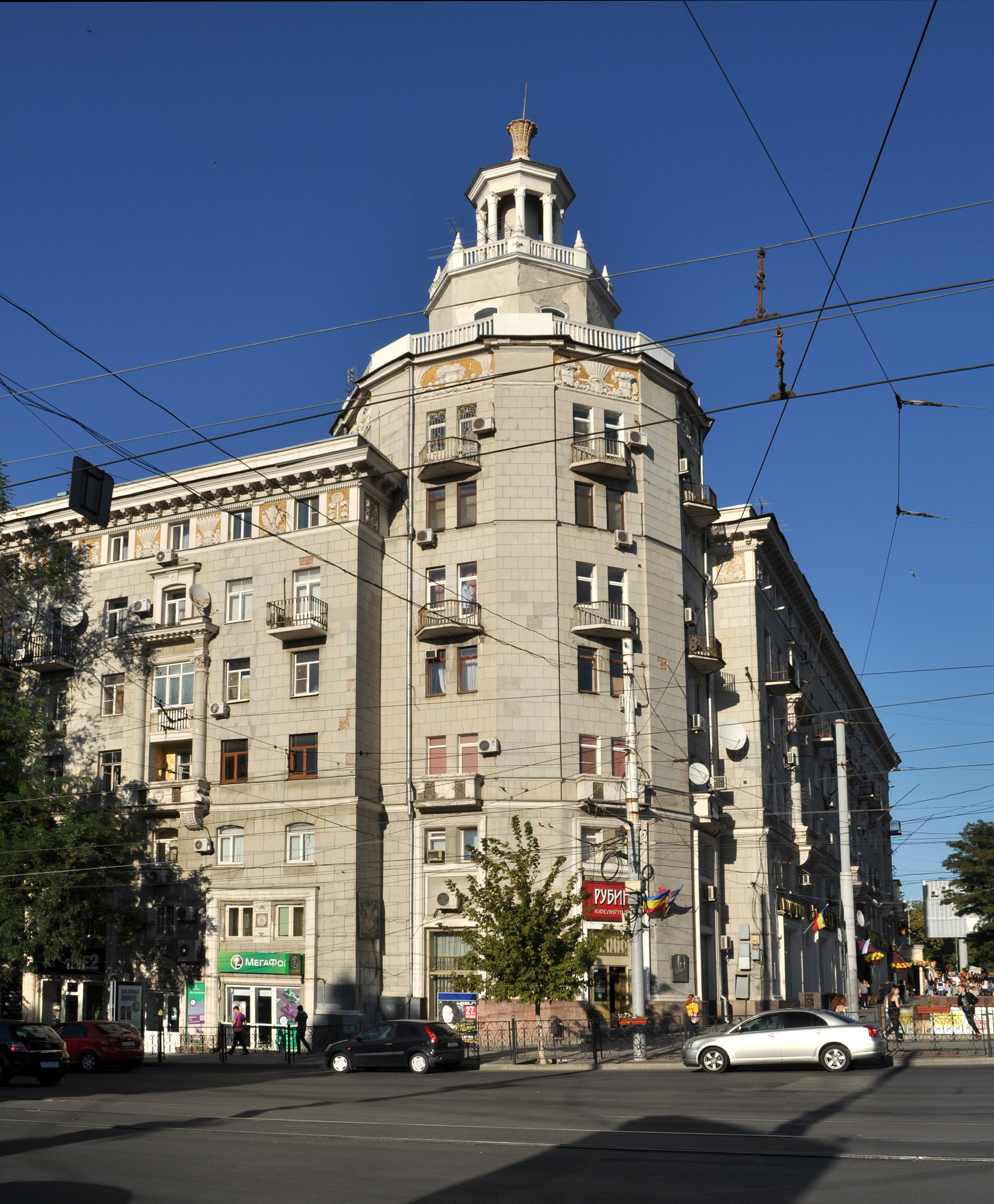
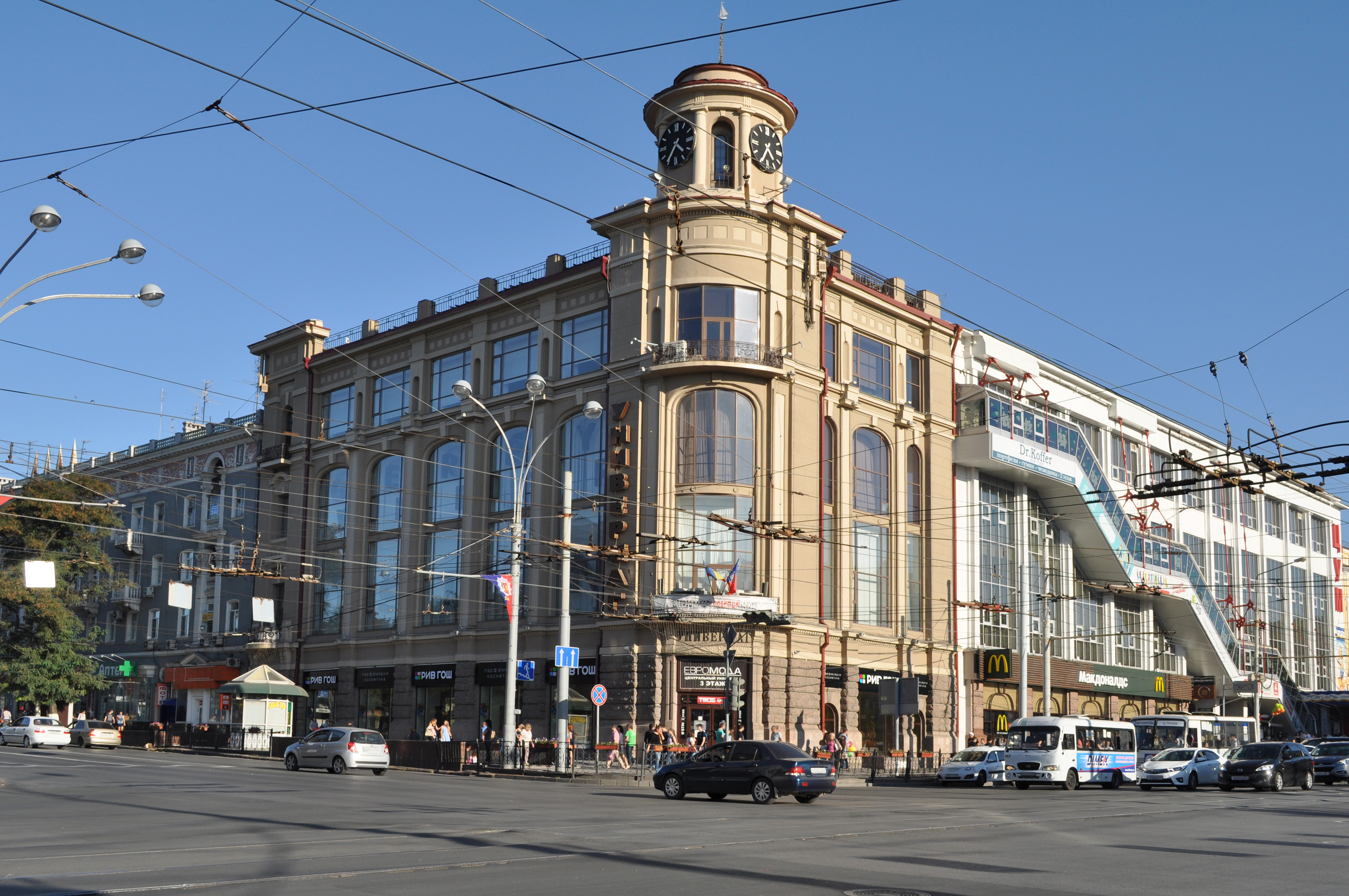
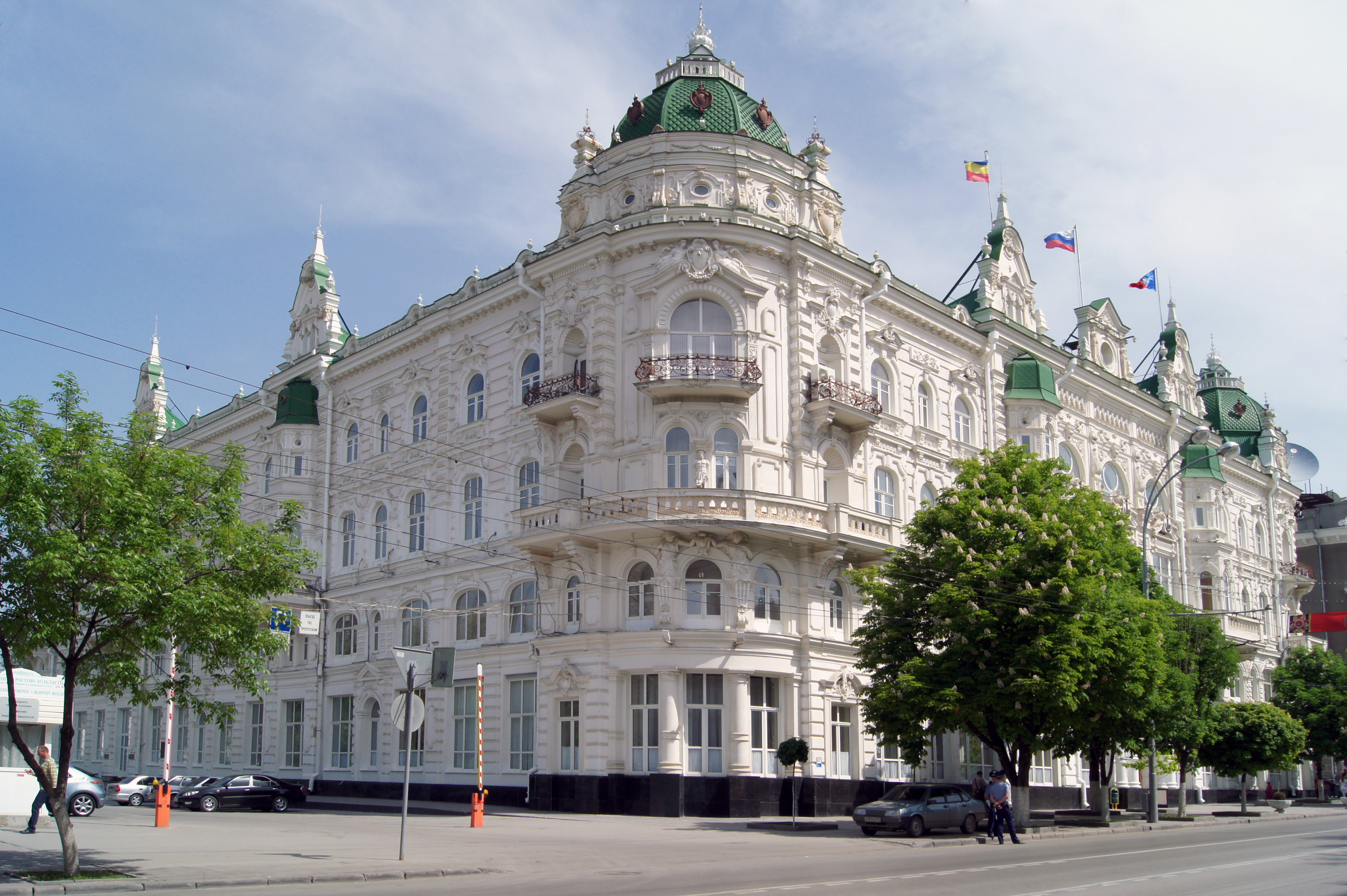
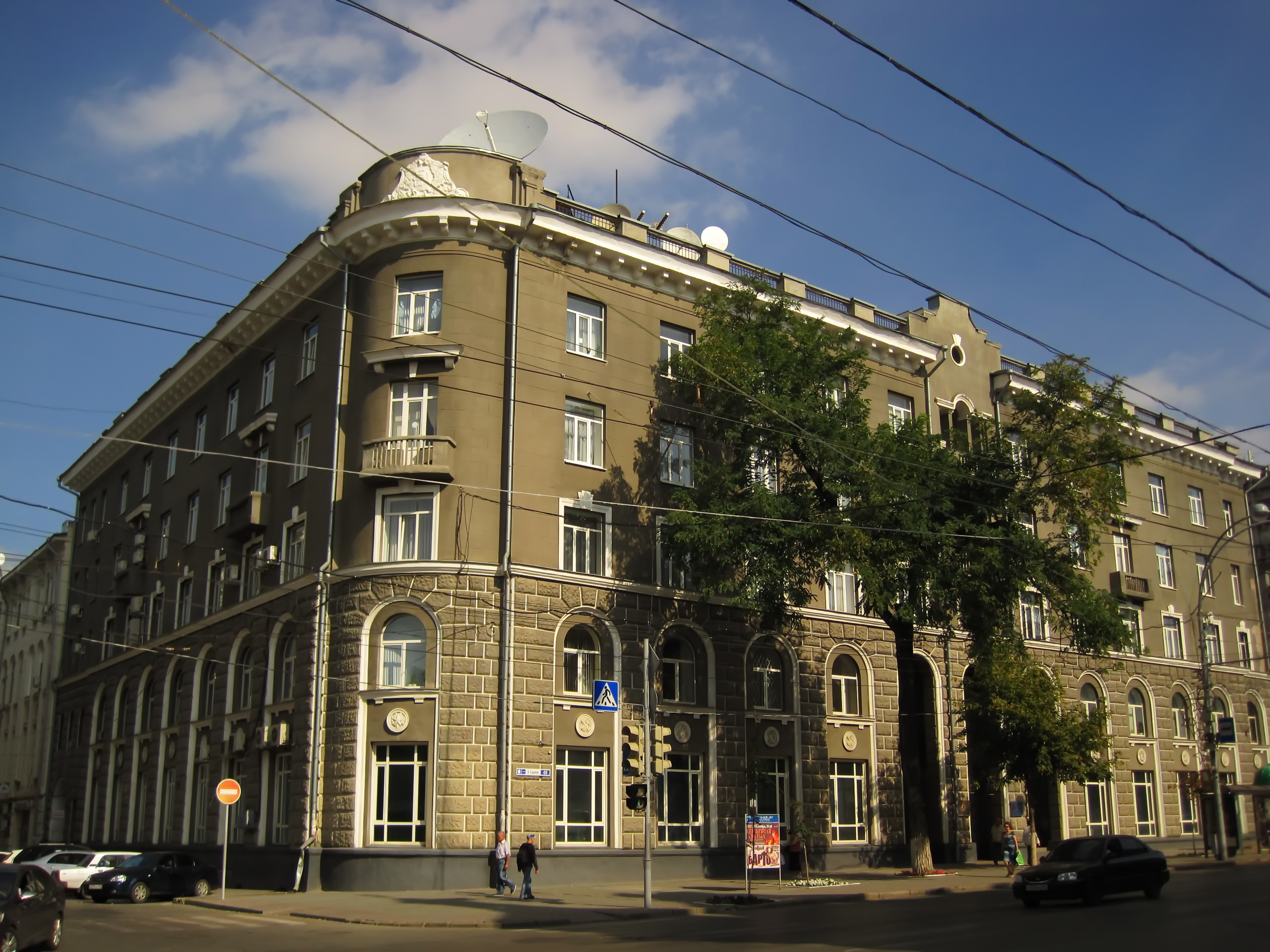
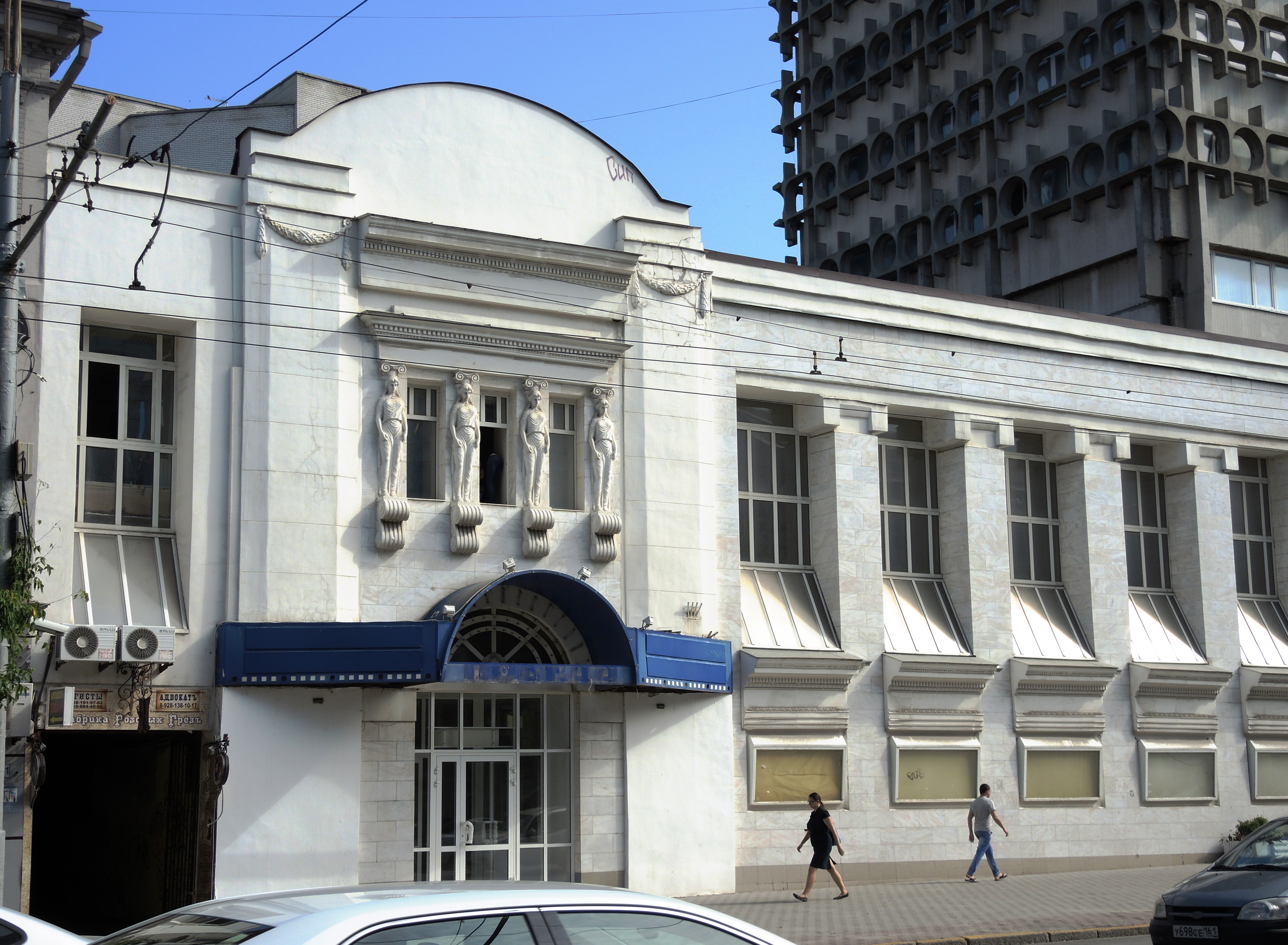
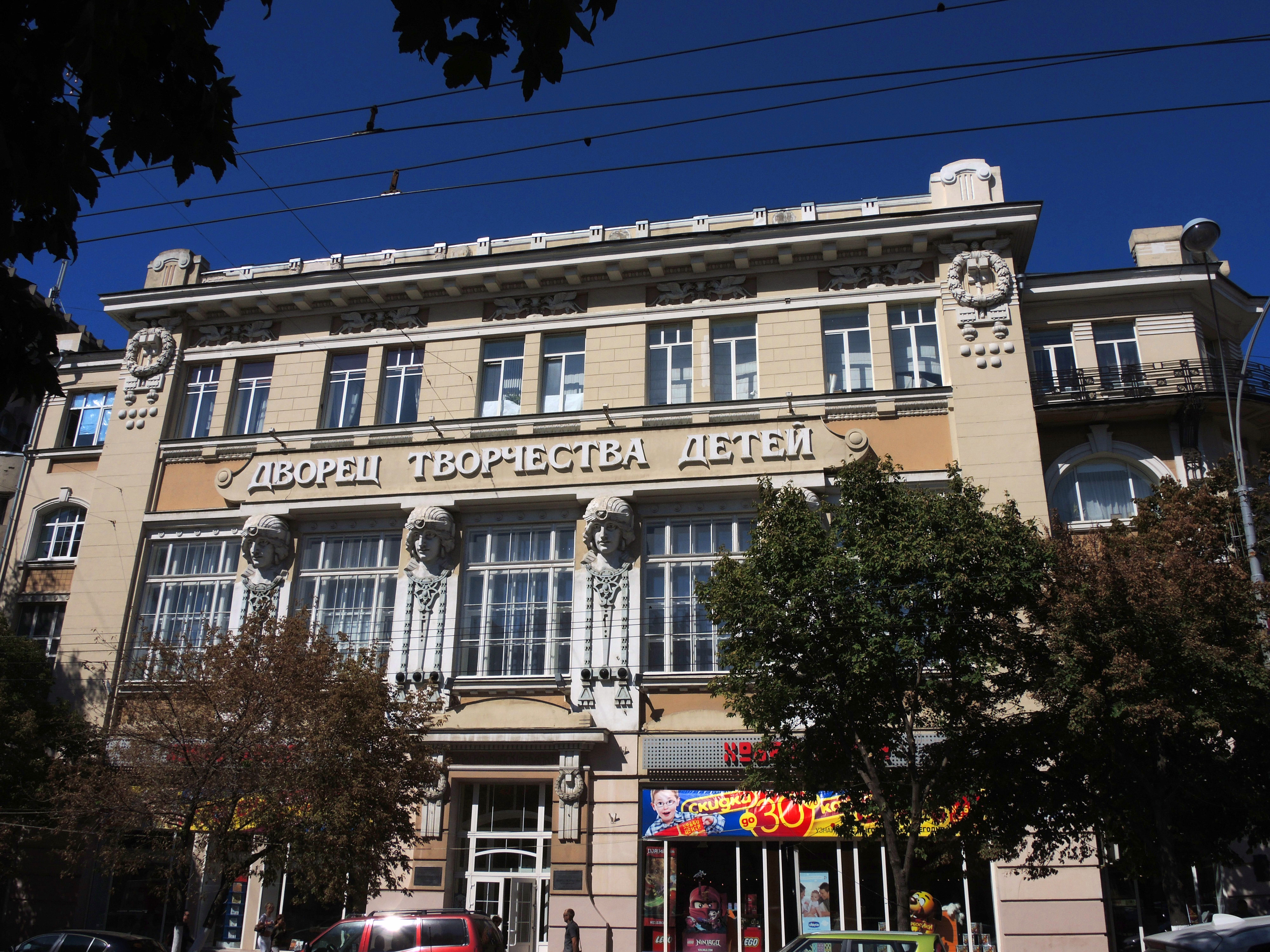
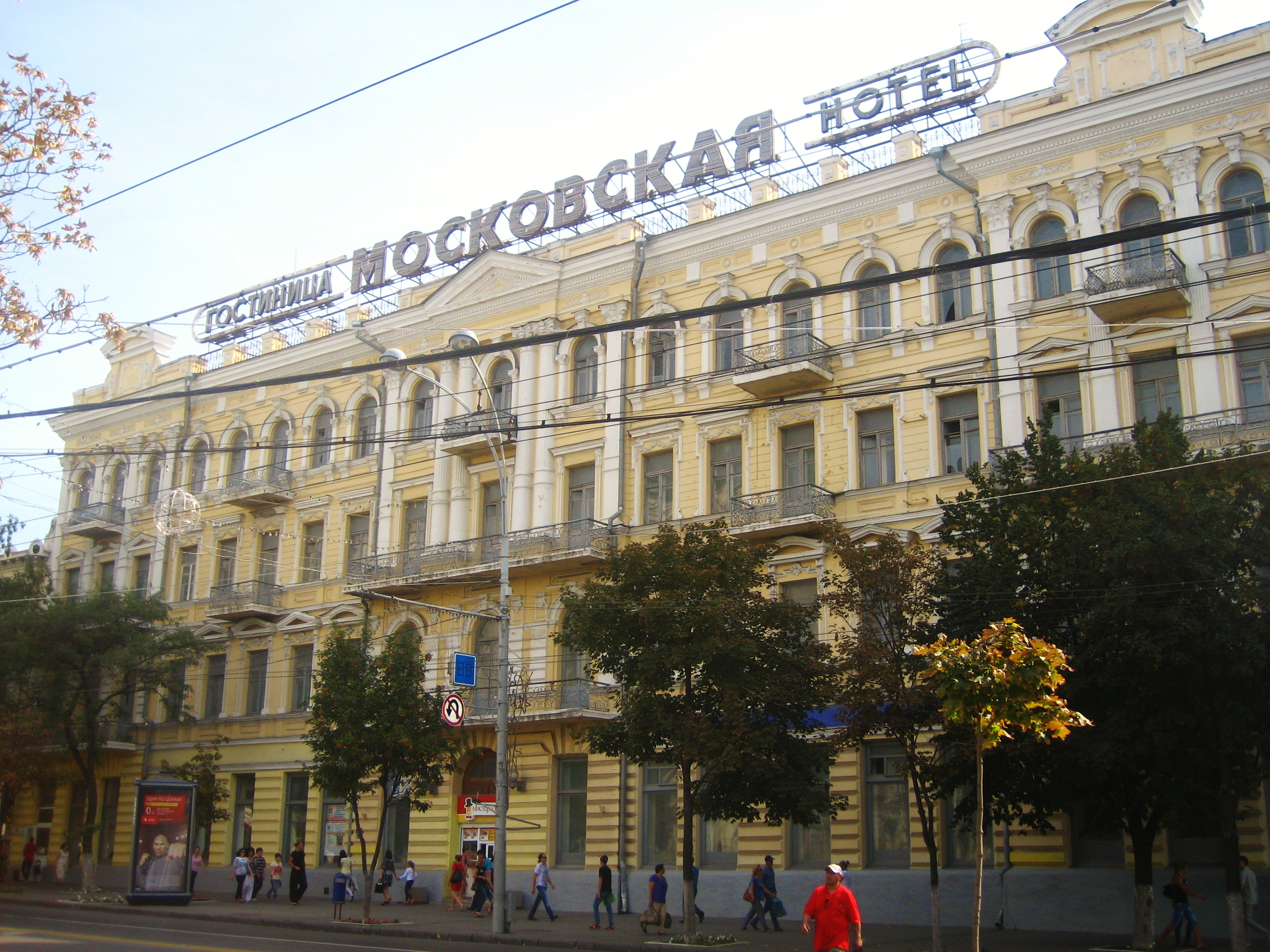
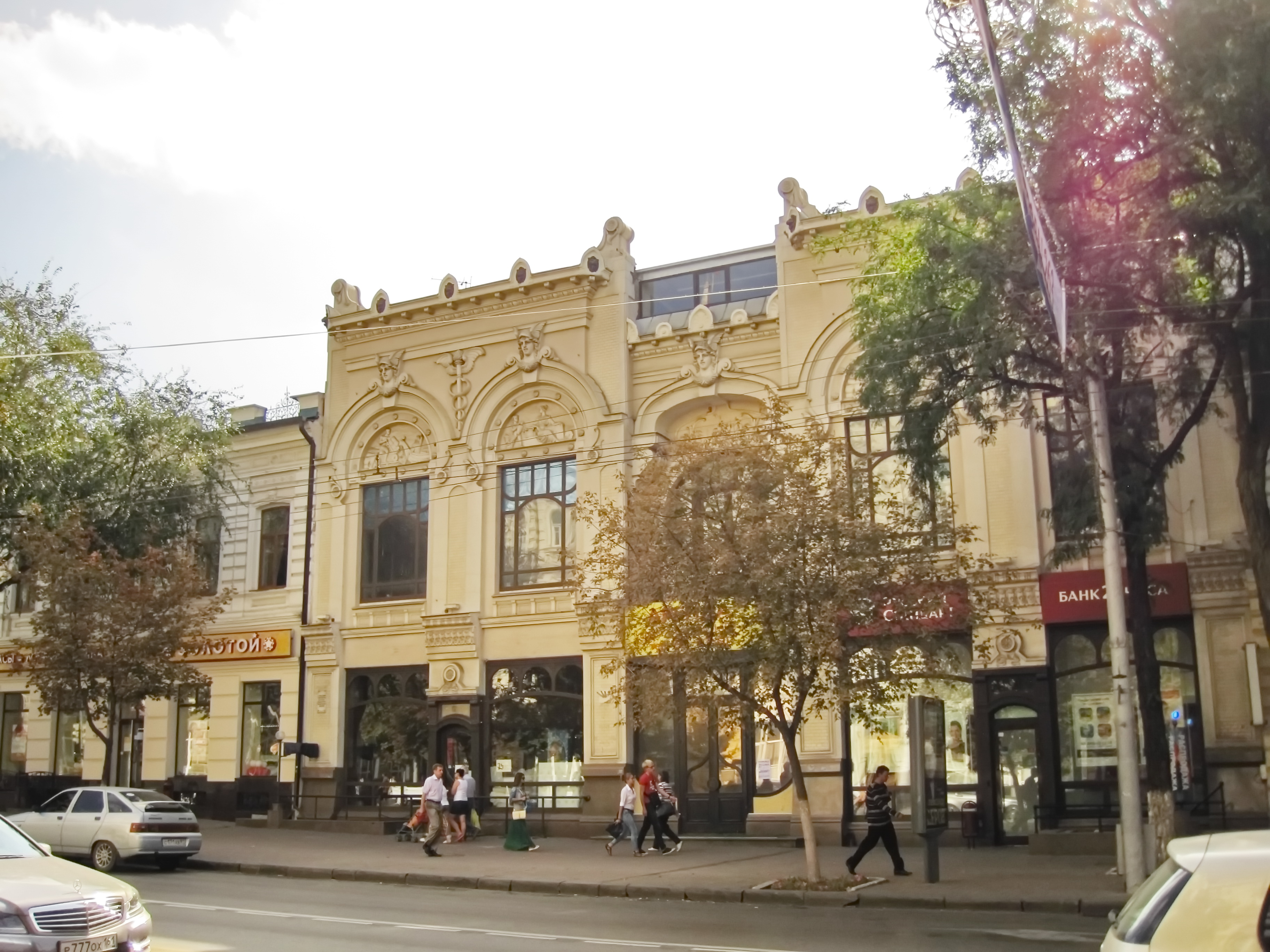
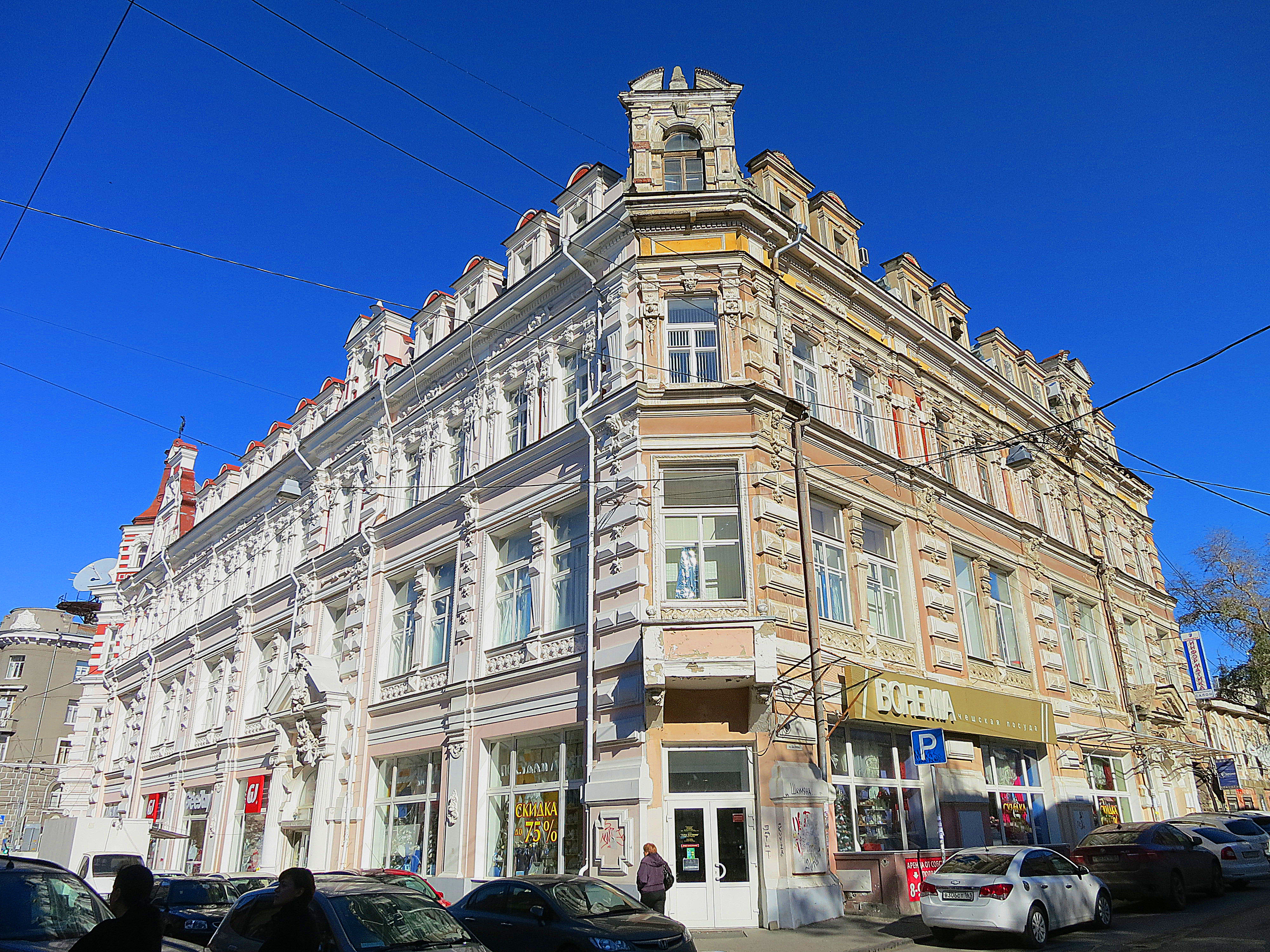
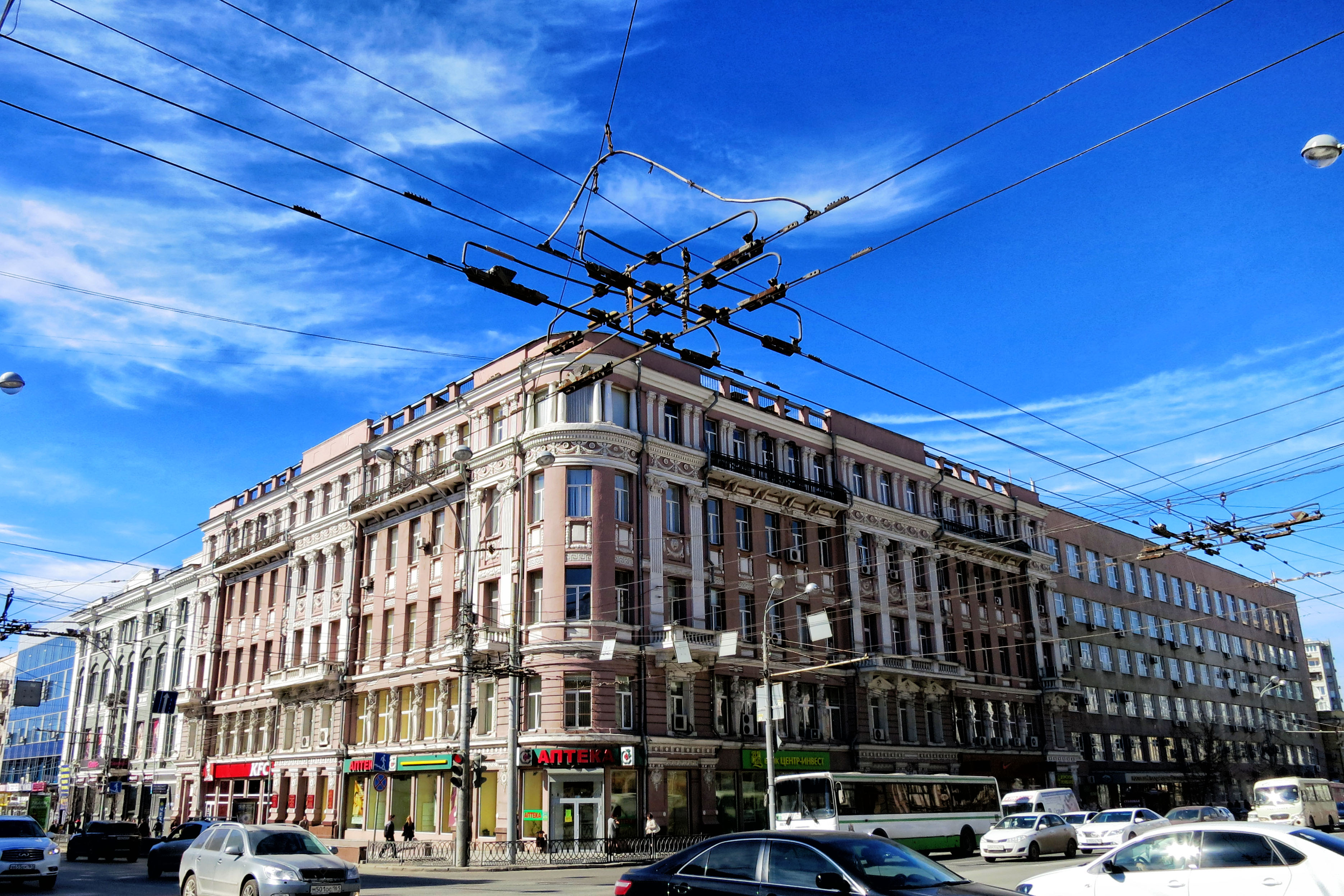
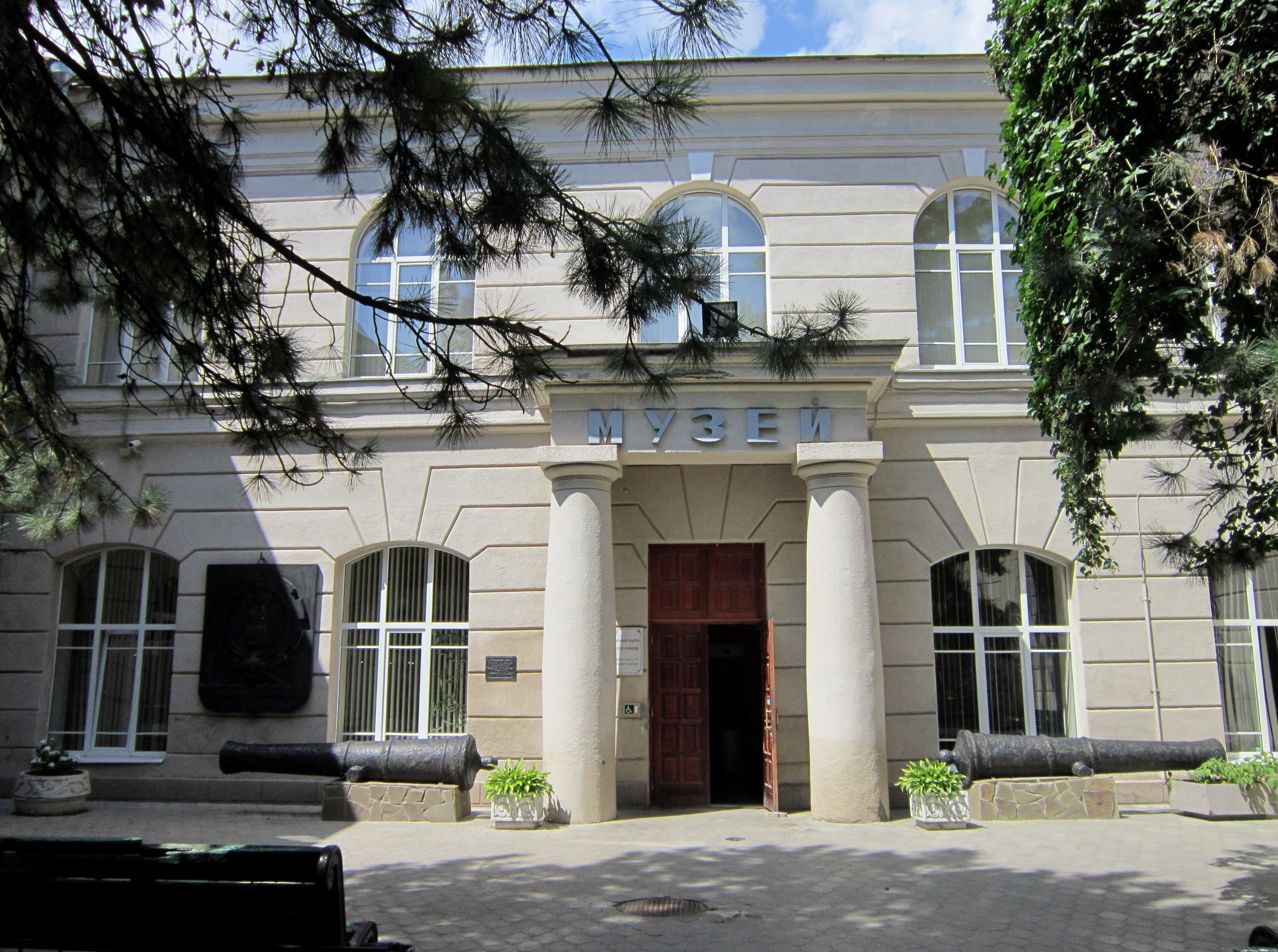
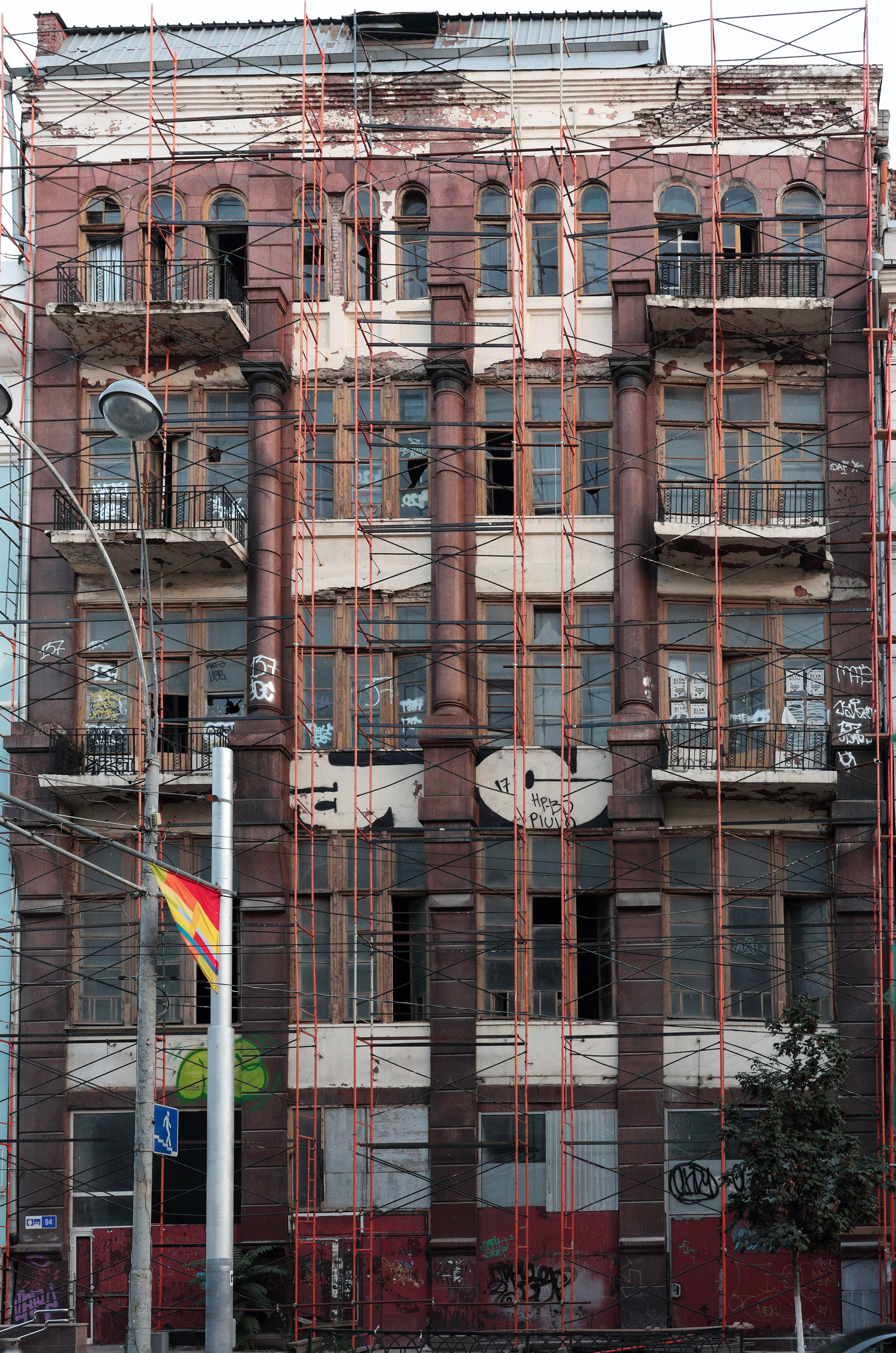
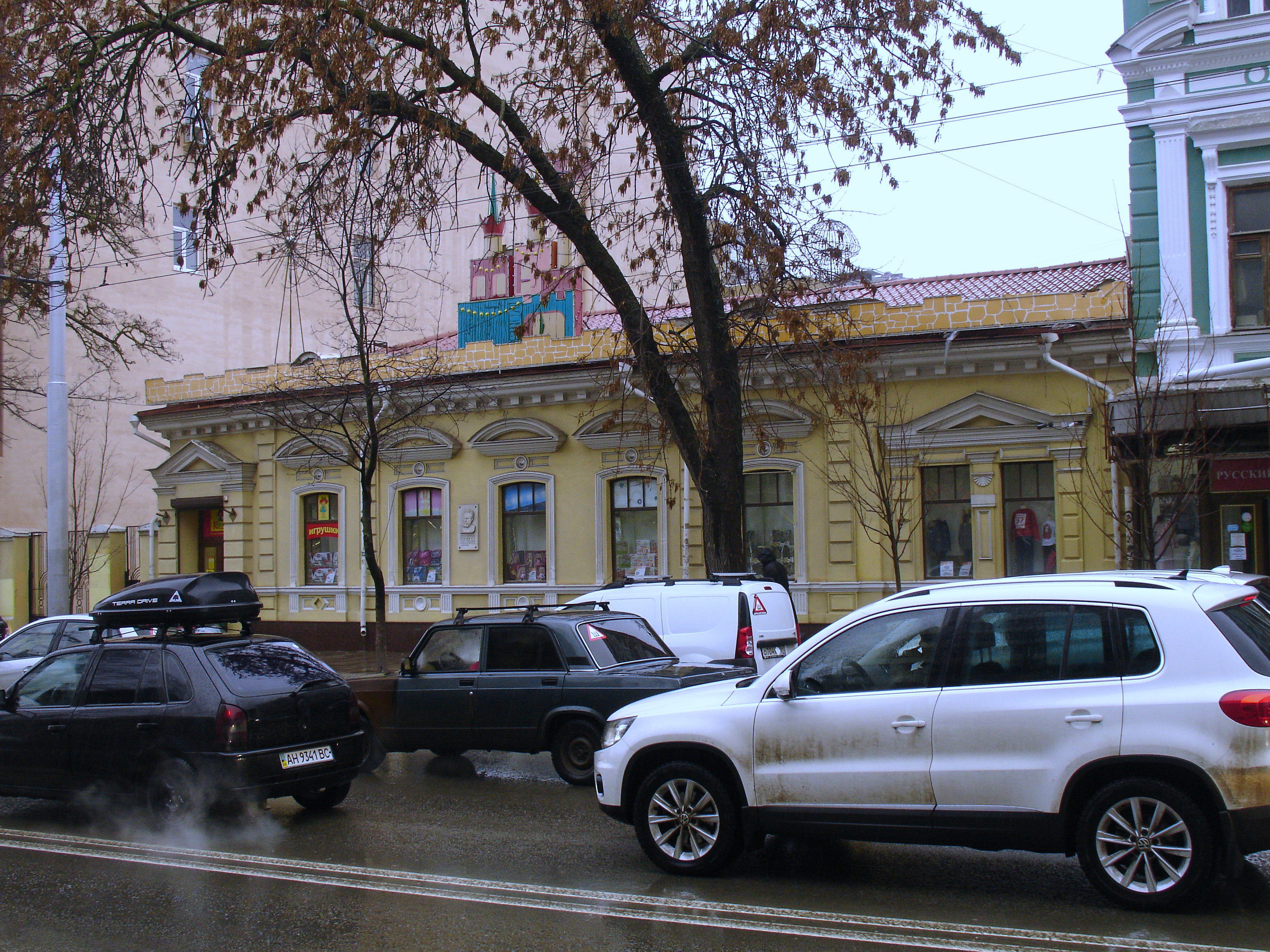
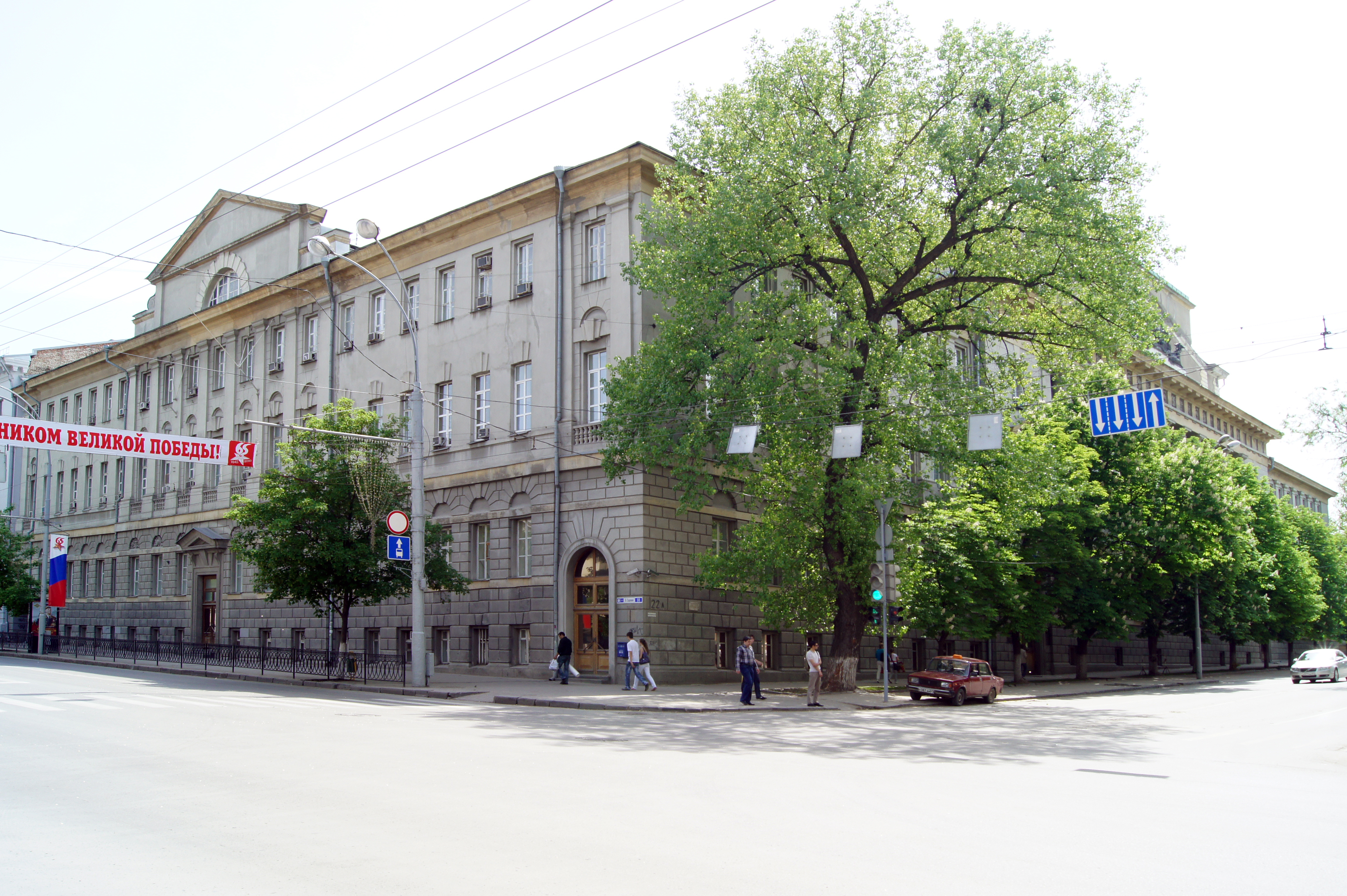
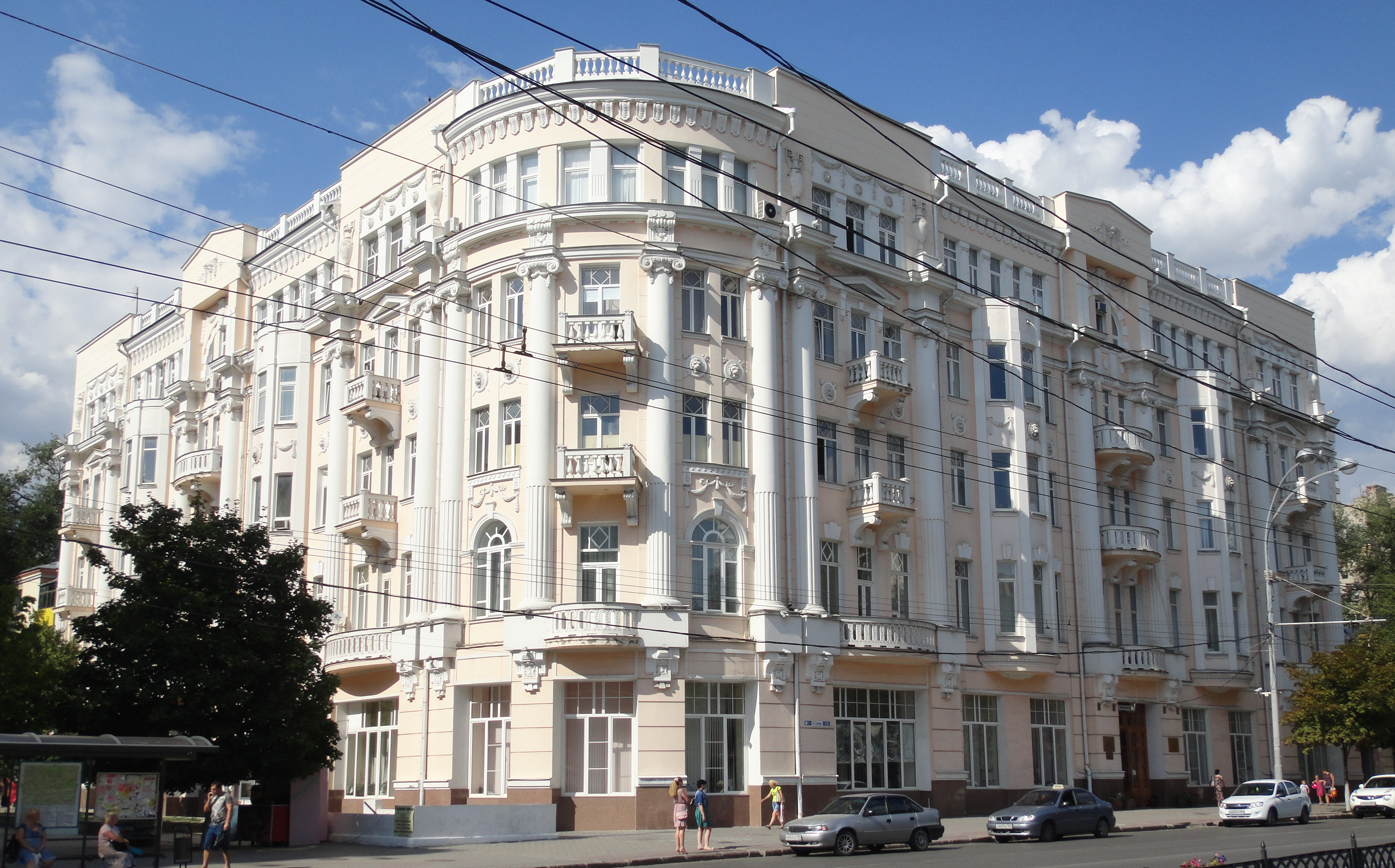
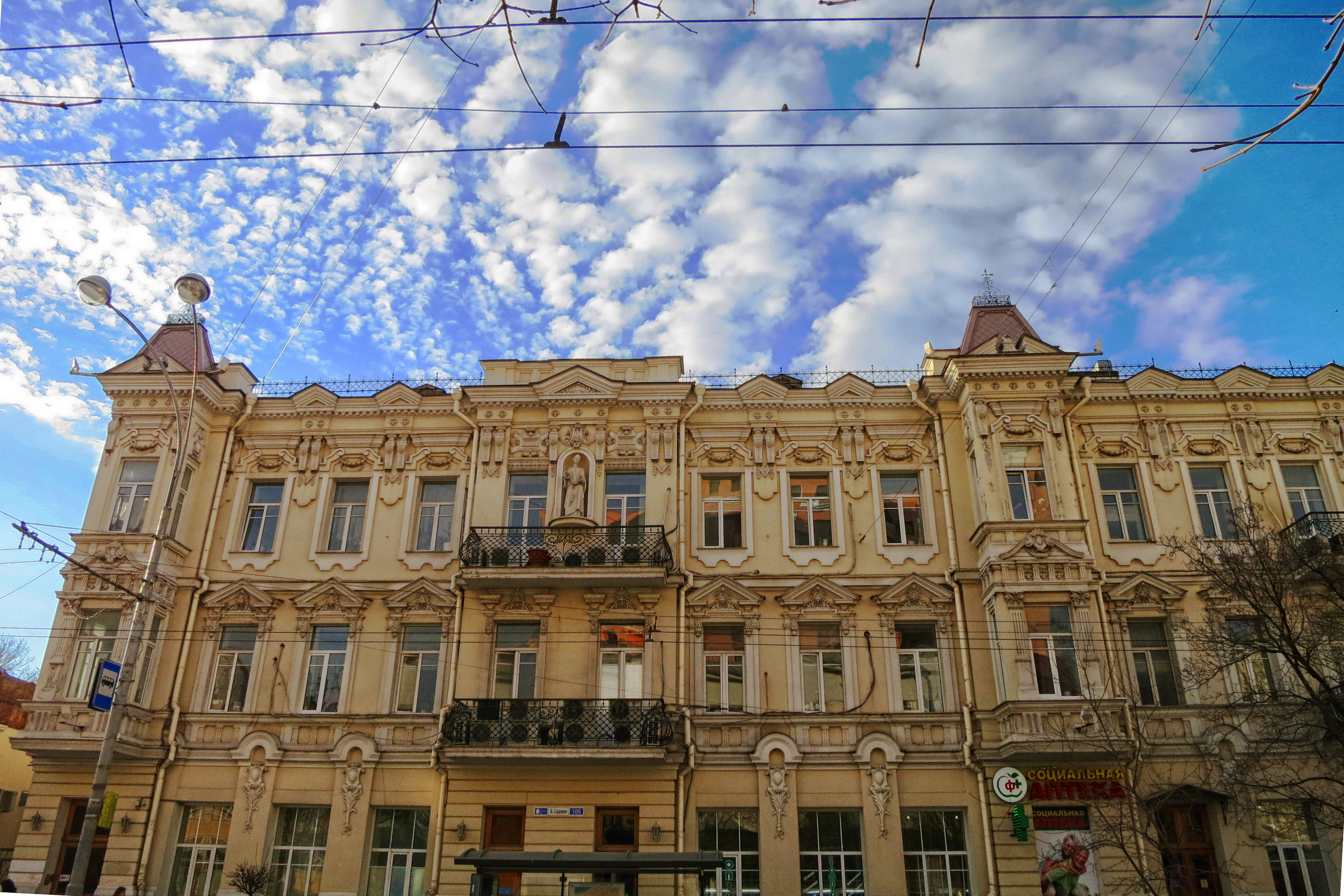
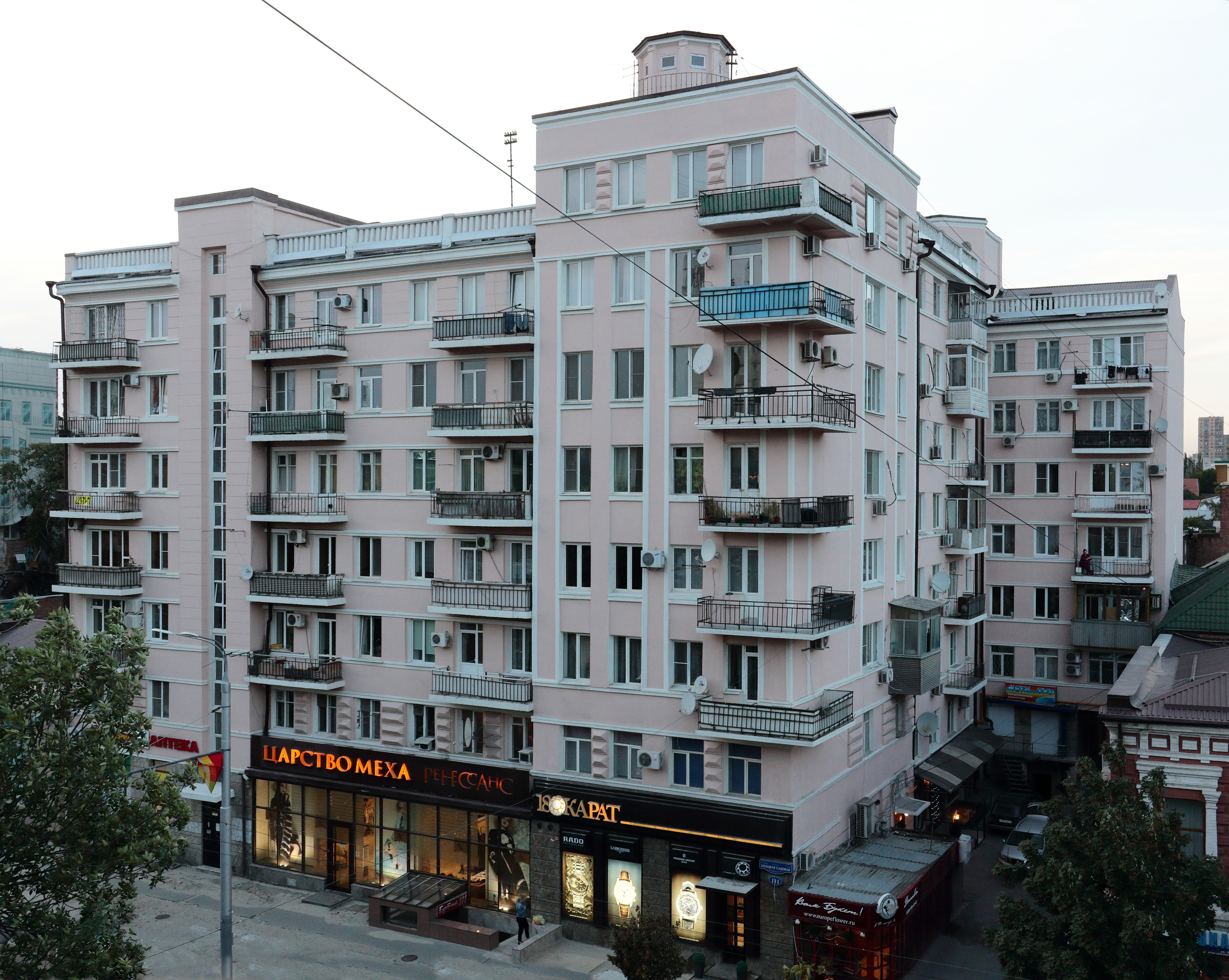
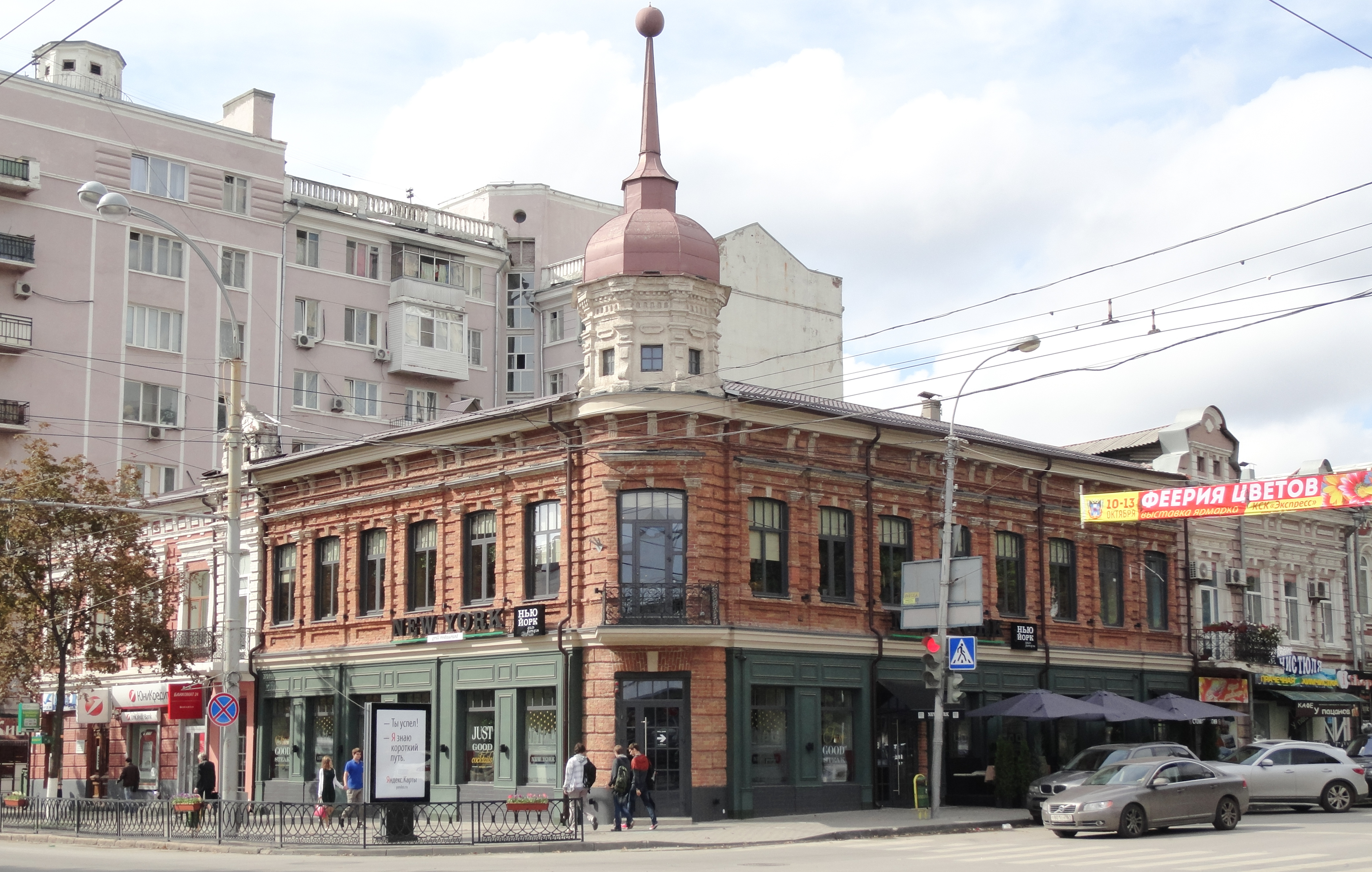
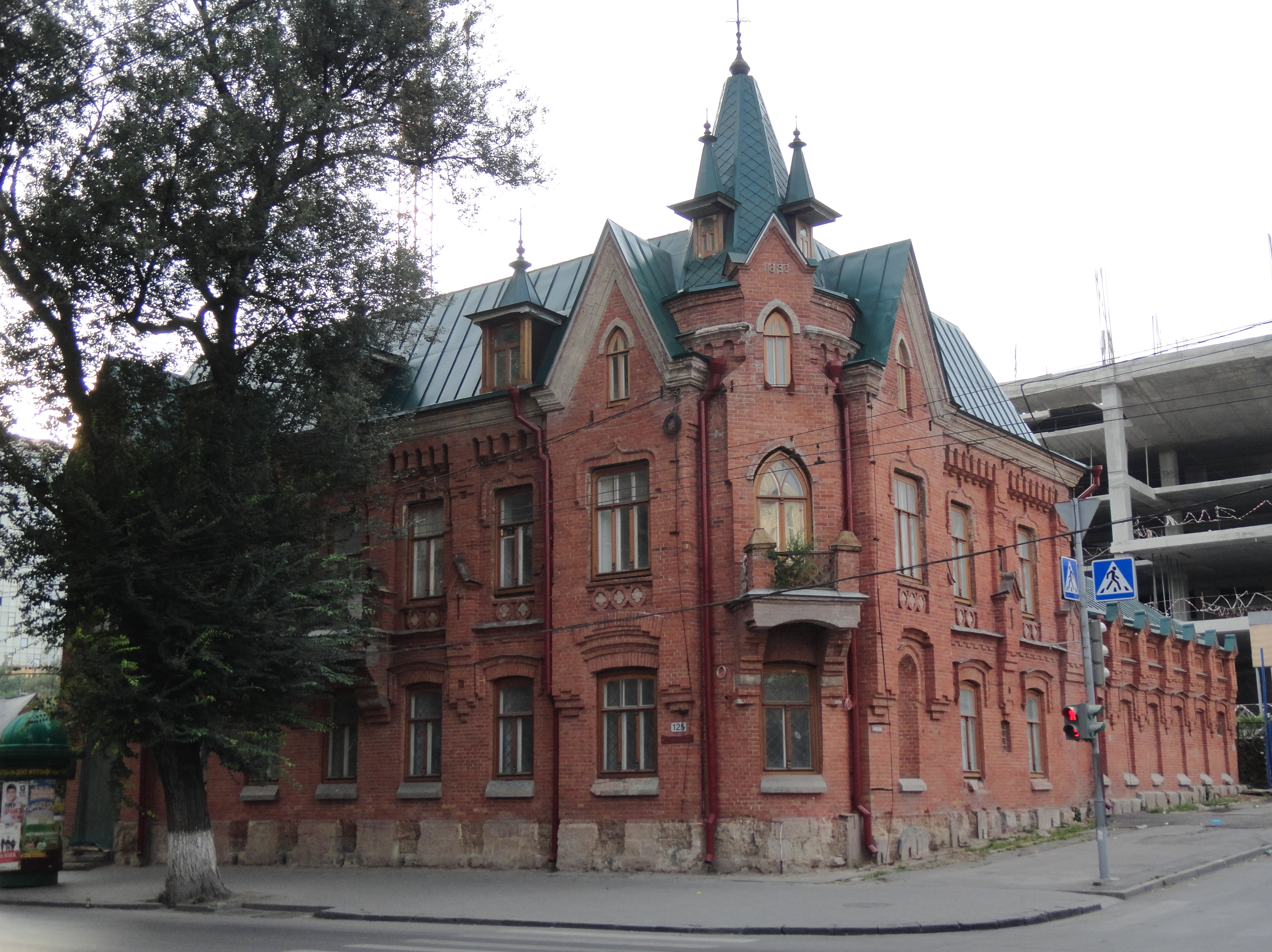
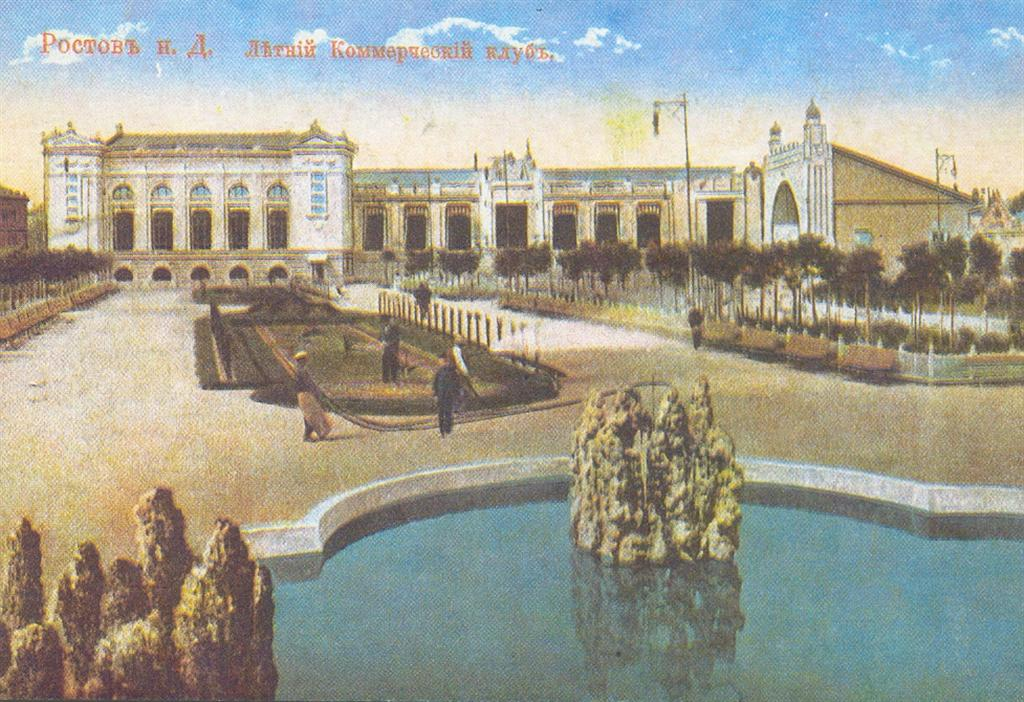
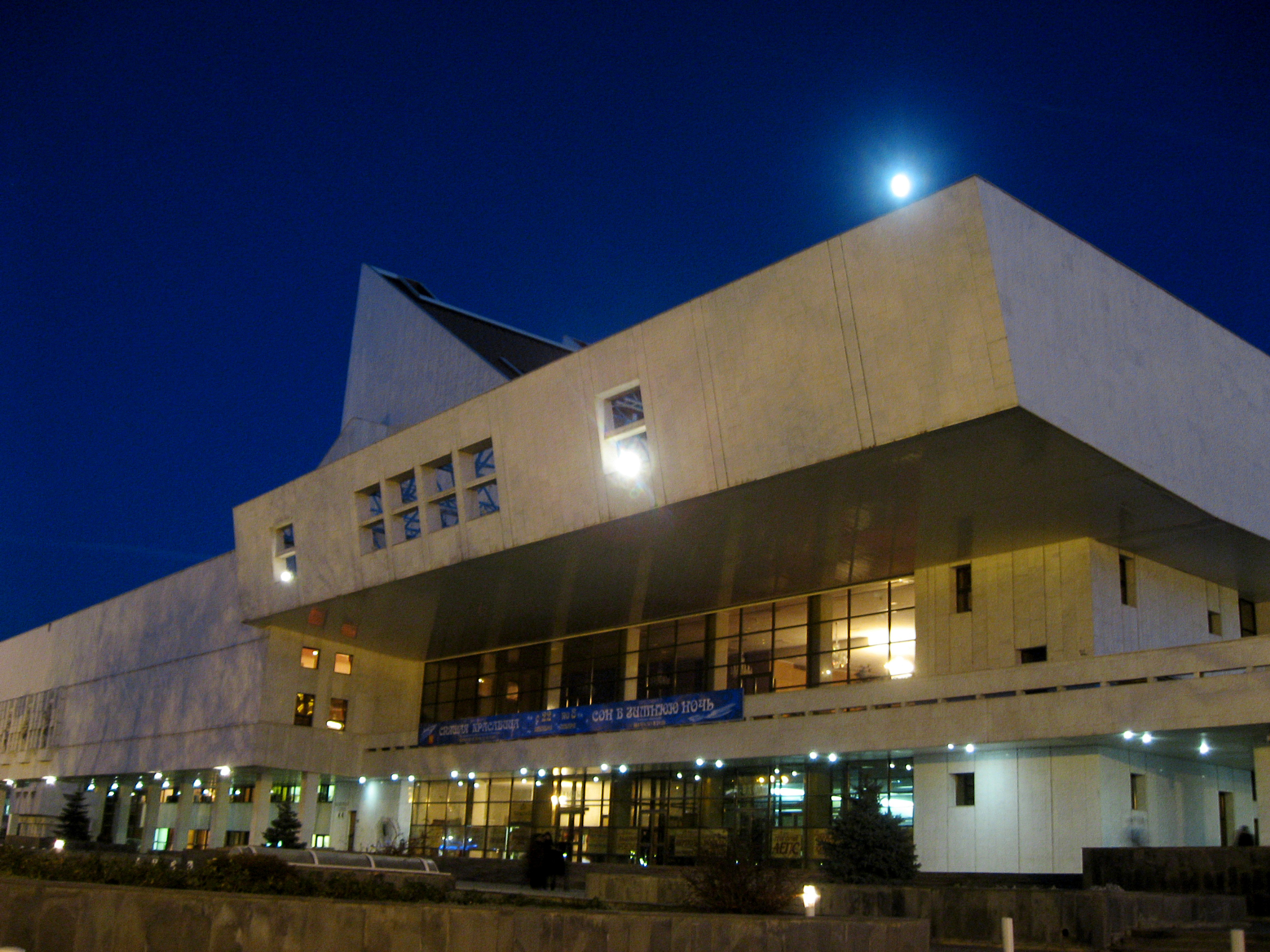
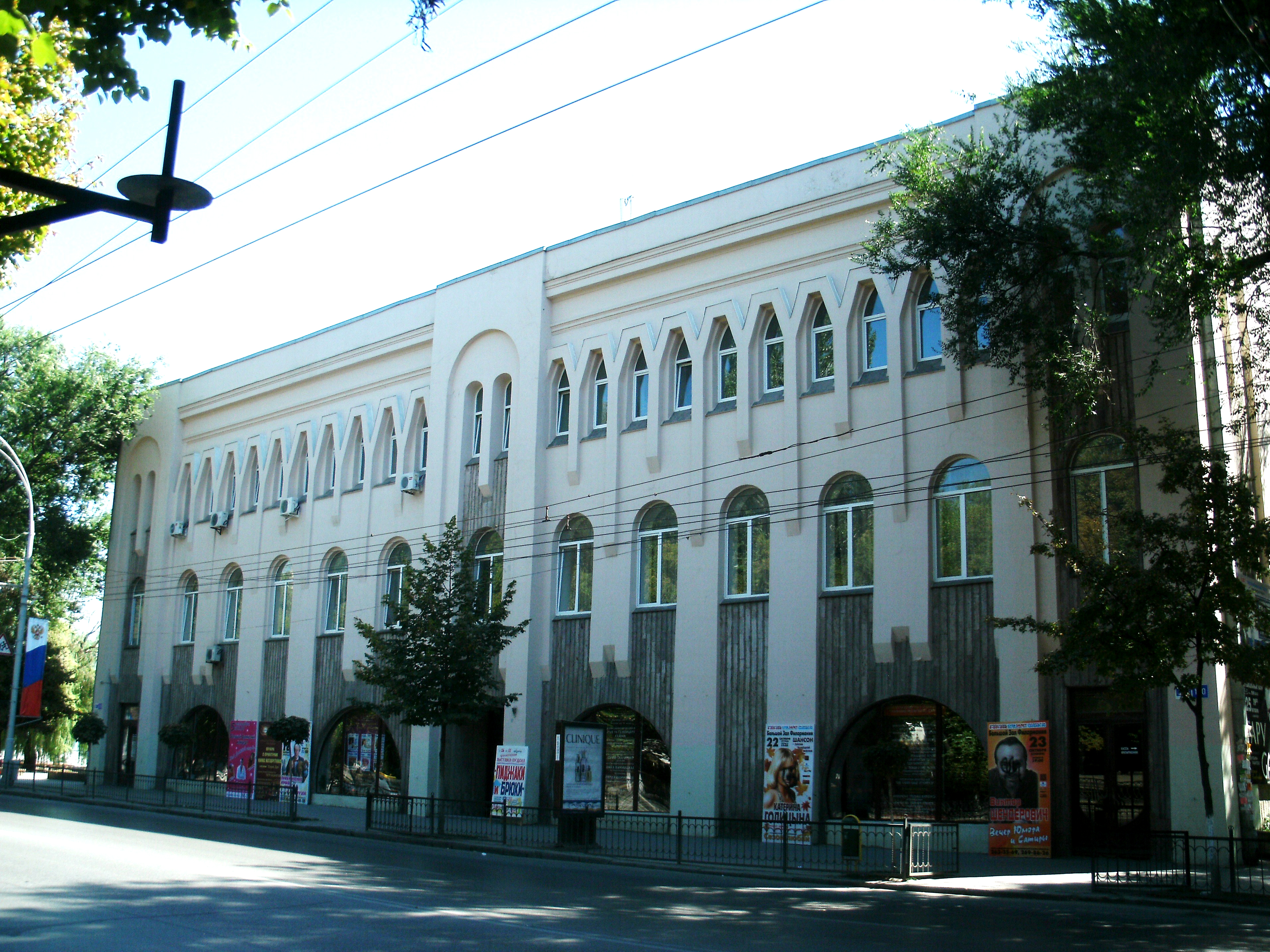
Number	Picture	Description
4		The "Vecherniy Rostov" newspaper headquarters.
10		The Argutinsky-Dolgorukov House is an Art Nouveau edifice. The building is considered to be an object of cultural heritage.
17		The Shaposhnikov revenue house. It is a monument of civil architecture of the late 19th century.
18		The former "Priazovskiy Kray" newspaper headquarters, a two-story building of the XIX century. The facade of the house is richly decorated.
27/47		The Chernova House was built in 1899 by architect N.A. Doroshenko. The facade of the house is richly decorated. It is considered to be an object of cultural heritage.
30/45		The Leonidov House was built in the early of the 20th century. Soviet writers Alexander Fadeyev, Vitaly Syomin and Alexander Bakharev lived there.
33		The former building of Imperial University of Warsaw, is now one of the buildings of the Southern Federal University. The Imperial University of Warsaw was evacuated from Poland to Rostov-on-Don during the World War I. The house was built by the architect I. E. Cherkessian in the Art Nouveau style. It is considered to be an object of cultural heritage.
43/32		The house was built in 1952 by the architect G.A. Petrov in the Stalinist Empire style. Composers S.A. Zaslavsky and N.K. Shaposhnikov lived and worked there.
46		The former Rostov Central Universal Department Store was built in 1910 by the architect E. M. Gulin. It is considered to be an object of cultural heritage.
47		The former city duma building, now the Rostov City Hall, was built in 1899 by the architect Alexander Pomerantsev in the eclectic tradition. The building is richly decorated with stucco in the baroque style. It is considered to be an object of cultural heritage.
49		The "Rostovenergo" building was built in 1952 by the architect Lev Eberg in the Stalinist Empire style.
51		The Ter-Abramyan House, a former revenue house, was built in 1886 in the baroque style. The building is considered to be an object of cultural heritage.
55		The Volga-Kama Bank Building was built in 1909 in the Art Nouveau style. Now it is the Palace of Children and Youth Creativity. The building is considered to be an object of cultural heritage.
62		The Moskovskaya Hotel was built in 1893–1896 by the architect Alexander Pomerantsev in the eclectic tradition. Now the hotel is under reconstruction. It is considered to be an object of cultural heritage.
64		The Trading house of Yablokovs was built in 1898. The facade of the house is decorated with the heads of Hermes and the caduceus. It is considered to be an object of cultural heritage.
68		Gench-Ogluev House was built in 1880–1883 by the architect Alexander Pomerantsev. It is a former revenue house. The house is considered to be an object of cultural heritage.
69		The Chernov House was built in the 1890s. It is a former revenue house. Now it is a main building of Rostov State Economic University. The building is considered to be an object of cultural heritage.
79		Rostov Regional Museum of Local History.
94		The Sariyev House was built in 1900s by the architect A.F. Niedermeier. Today the building is in poor condition.
97		The one-story mansion was built in the third quarter of the 19th century. The physiologist Ivan Pavlov lived there. The house is considered to be an object of cultural heritage.
98/22		The State Bank building was built in 1915 by the architect Marian Peretyatkovich in the style of neoclassicism. It is considered to be an object of cultural heritage.
105		The main building of the Southern Federal University was built in 1917 by the architect Grigori Vasiliev. It is considered to be an object of cultural heritage.
106/46		The Tokarev House was built in 1905. It was a revenue house. In Soviet times there was a hospital. In 1945 Clementine Churchill stayed in the building. It is considered to be an object of cultural heritage.
111		The apartment building was built in 1928 in the constructivist style. The writer Dmitry Petrov (Biryuk) lived there.
113		The Masalitina house was built in 1890 by the architect Grigori Vasiliev. It is considered to be an object of cultural heritage.
125		The Martyn Brothers House was built in 1893 by the architect N. M. Sokolov in a neo-Gothic style. Today it belongs to the National Sholokhov Museum-Reserve.
127		The former Summer Commercial Club complex was built in 1913 by the architect N. N. Gelat in the Art Nouveau style. The ensemble of the commercial club included a summer garden (now the park named after May 1). The complex is considered to be an object of cultural heritage.
134		The Rostov State Musical Theater building was erected in 1977–1999.
170		The Rostov State Philharmonia building was erected in the early 20th century, in 1976–1978 it was reconstructed.
