= Main building of Warsaw University (Rostov-on-Don) =

- Главный корпус Варшавского университета (Russian)
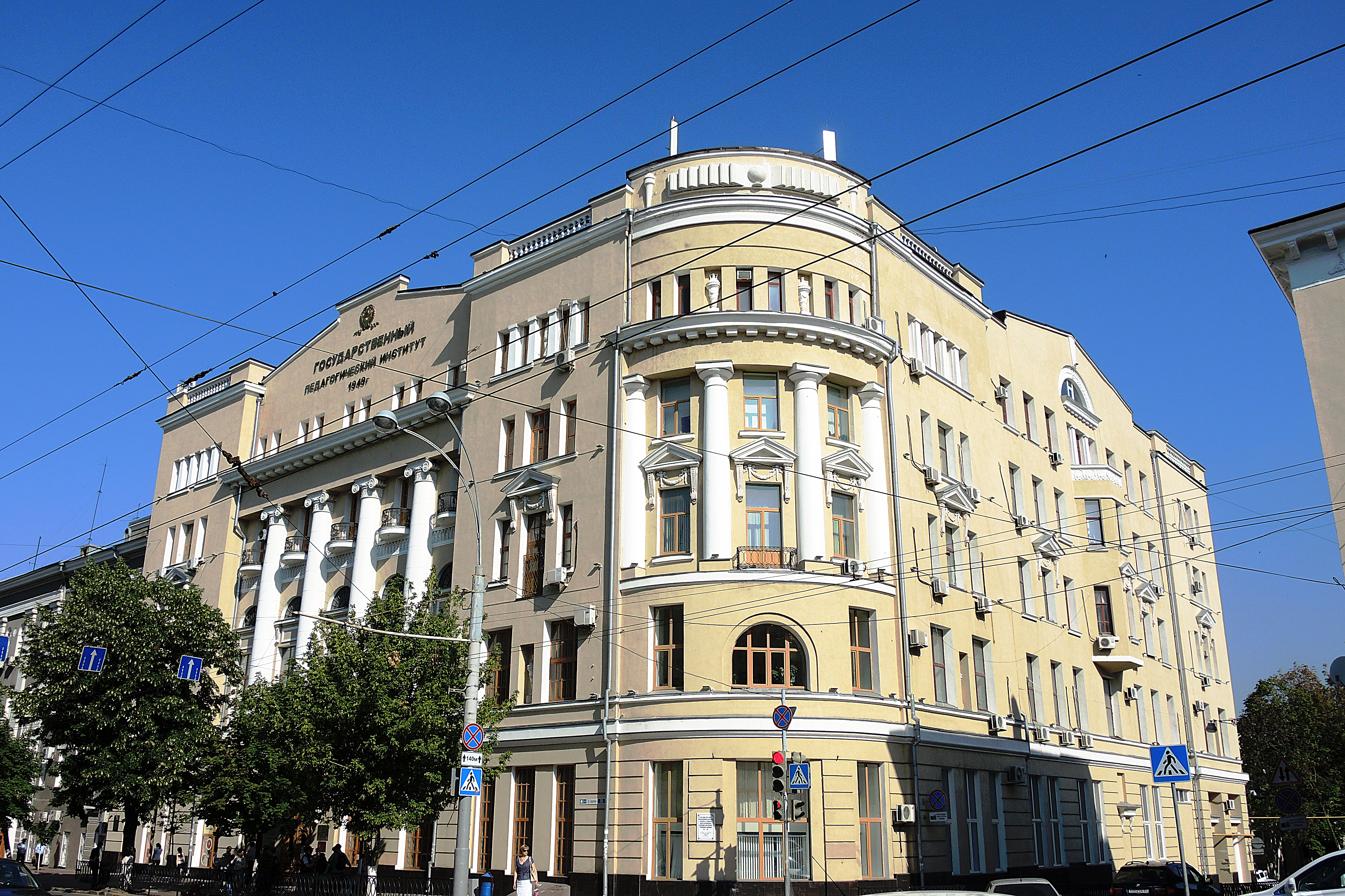
- Main building of Warsaw University

- Location within Rostov Oblast
- 47°13′10″N 39°42′16″E
- Type: building
- Location: 33 Bolshaya Sadovaya Street, Rostov-on-Don, Rostov Oblast Russia

History
- Built: 1914

The main building of Warsaw University (Russian: Главный корпус Варшавского университета) is a building in Rostov-on-Don. It was designed by the architect I. E. Cherkessian and constructed in 1912–1914. It is located at the corner of Bolshaya Sadovaya street and Ostrovsky Lane, and is currently occupied by the Southern Federal University. It was built in the Art Nouveau style and has the status of an object of cultural heritage of regional significance.

== History ==
At the beginning of the 20th century the area of the intersection of Pochtovy Lane (now Ostrovsky Lane) and Bolshaya Sadovaya Street was occupied by factory buildings, including that of the merchant of the 1st Guild N. I. Churilin. In 1912, the city council decided to build a revenue house here. A competition was held, in which the first place was awarded to the design of I. E. Cherkessian (Cherkesov), a student of the Institute of Civil Engineers. The second and the third places were taken by the designs of the Kiev engineer I. G. Torov and the Rostov architect Grigory Vasilyev respectively. The Cherkessian design was approved with some changes. In the same year, construction began, and in 1914 the city's revenue house was opened.

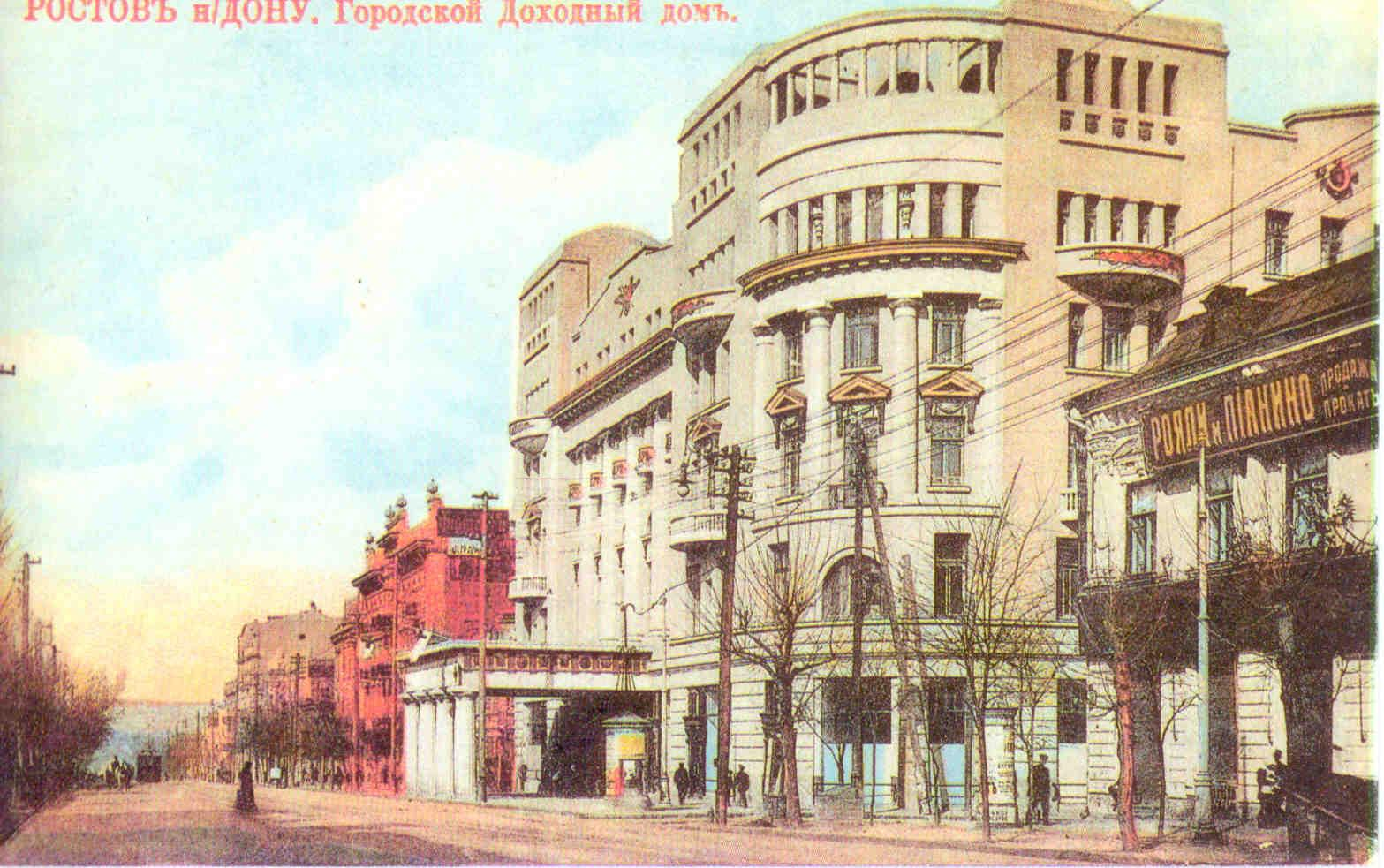
The city revenue house shortly after completion in a c. 1914 postcard

In 1915, during the First World War, German advances threatened Warsaw, and it was decided to evacuate the University of Warsaw to Rostov-on-Don. The city's revenue house became the main building of the university, housing the historical-philological, physical-mathematical, law and medical faculties, various scientific societies, laboratories and clinics. In 1917, the university was renamed Don University. In the mid-1930s, the main building of Rostov University moved to the Kistov revenue house. The city's former revenue house was then occupied by the Rostov Pedagogical Institute.

In 1993 the Pedagogical Institute became the Rostov State Pedagogical University, and in 2006, it was merged with other universities in the city to become the Southern Federal University. The building currently houses the university's Institute of History and International Relations.
