= Pivovarova House =

- Доходный дом Пивоваровой
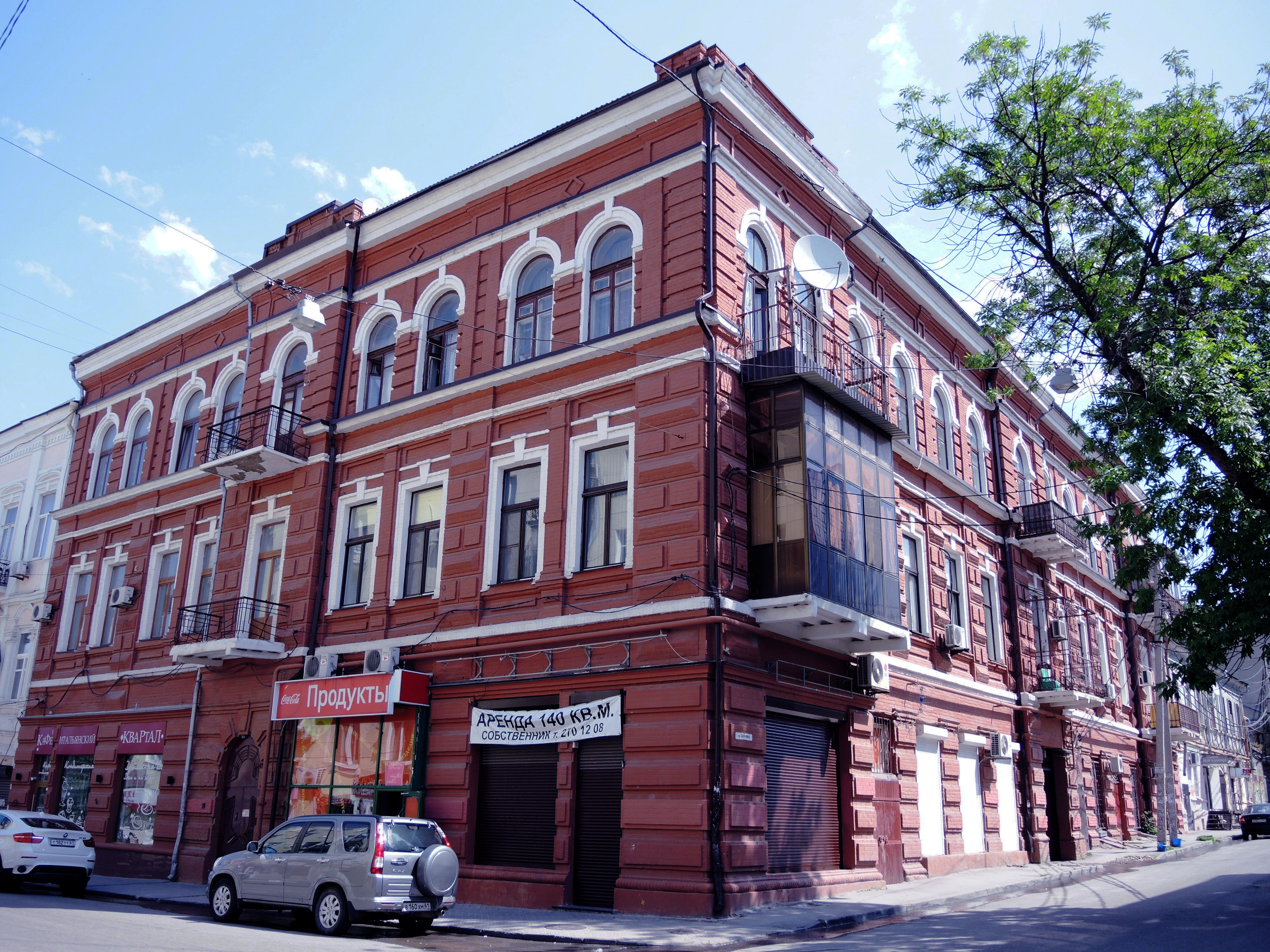
- 47°13′13″N 39°42′40″E
- Location: 45/28 Shaumyan Street, Rostov-on-Don

The Pivovarova House (Russian: Дом Пивоваровой) is a building in Rostov-on-Don at 45/28 Shaumyan Street. It was built as a revenue house in the late 19th - early 20th century and has the status of an object of cultural heritage. It was inscribed as an object of cultural heritage according to order No. 191 of the Regional Inspectorate for Labour Protection and Operation of Historical and Cultural Monuments, dated 29 December 2004. It is not known who the house is now named after.

== History ==
The building was constructed in the late 19th - early 20th century by Dr Pyotr Pavlovich Chubukhchiyev. The building was his property until 1915. The house has survived into the 21st century.

In February 2013 it became known that the building was partially reconstructed without obtaining official consent necessary due to its status as an object of cultural heritage. The ground floor of the house was rented out as a cafe. In April 2013, information appeared that repair work was being carried out on the foundation of the house to link into the sewer, despite the fact that all legislative norms were not observed. As a result of the work, according to the residents, cracks appeared in the apartments. An employee of the regional Ministry of Culture recorded a violation of the integrity of the object, taken under the protection of the state.
