= Chirikov House =

Architectural monument in Rostov-on-Don, Rostov Oblast, Russia

Coordinates: 47.1326°N 39.4222°E

Chirikov Revenue House
- Доходный дом Чирикова
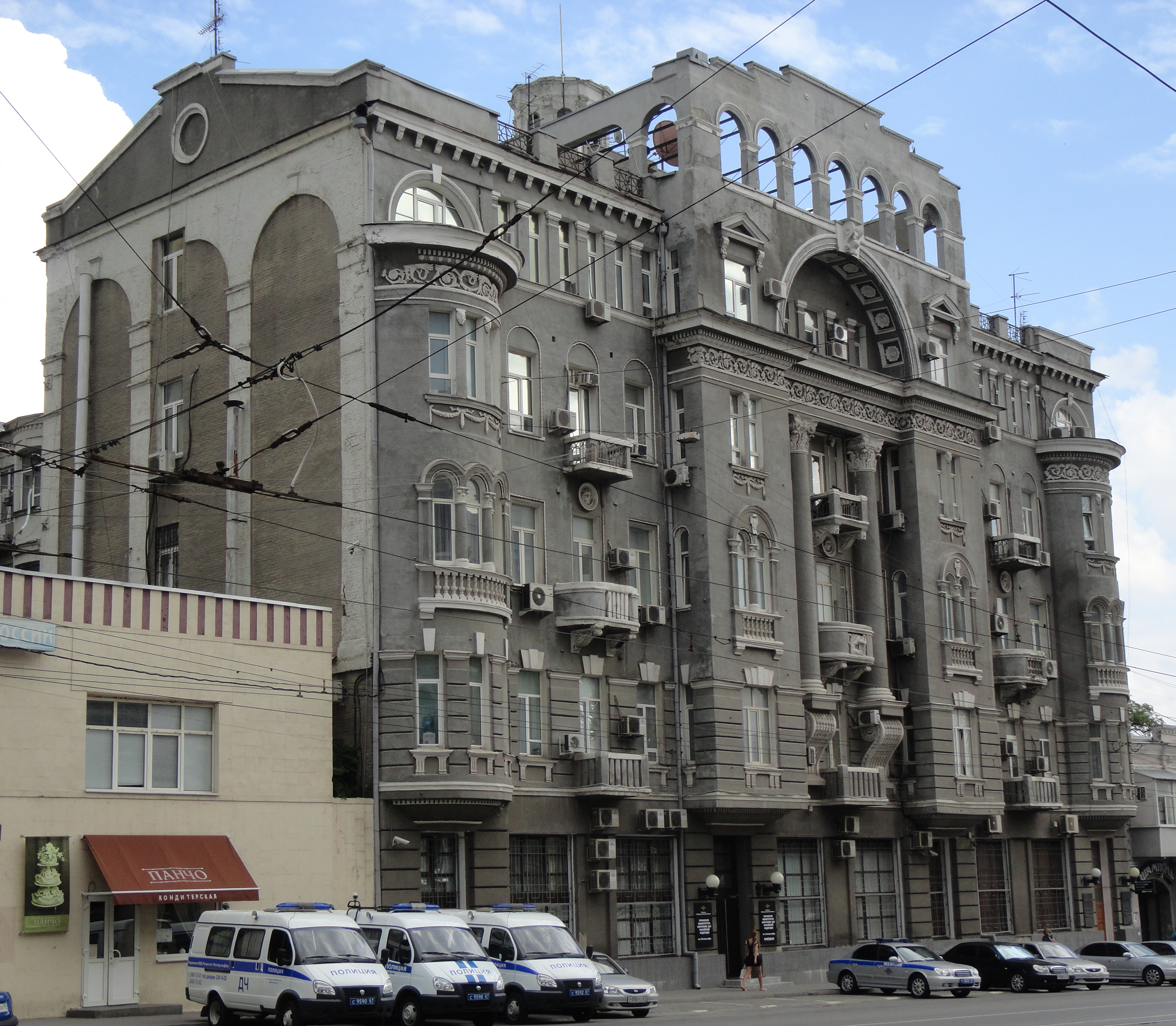
- Established: 1913
- Location: Rostov-on-Don, Rostov Oblast, Russia
- Type: Revenue house

The Chirikov House (Russian: Дом Чирикова), also known as the Chirikov Revenue House (Russian: Доходный дом Чирикова) is an architectural monument in the city of Rostov-on-Don, Rostov Oblast, Russia, that was built in 1913 in the Eclectic style to the design of architect Leonid Eberg. It is officially listed as an object of cultural heritage of Russia.

== History ==
The revenue house on Taganrog Avenue (now Budennovsky Avenue) was built at the beginning of the 20th century for Vladimir Kirillovich Chirikov, who owned a confectionary factory, and was a member of the city government and the chairman of Mutual Credit Society. The project designer was architect Leonid Fedorovich Eberg, who also supervised the construction works. In 1912, as construction neared completion, Chirikov visited the site and demanded the installation of two columns on the facade. The architect objected to the installation of the columns, since the composition of the building was based on the architectural principles of the Renaissance. In response, Chirikov said: "And who pays you the money ― the Renaissance or me?" Eberg had no choice but to install the two columns.

The house is five-storey brick building with a plastered facade, a multi-pitched roof, and two rectangular bay windows, which are united on the top floor with a massive arch topped with a decorative arcade over the cornice. Two sculptures in antique style stood on the pediment until 1917, but disappeared after the October Revolution.

During the Russian Civil War, the building served as a hospital for the wounded soldiers of Anton Denikin's White Army. The house escaped damage during World War II, despite the heavy shelling of the city.

Today the Chirikov House is occupied by Leninsky City District's police department No. 4.
