= Sariyev House =

- Доходный дом Сариевых
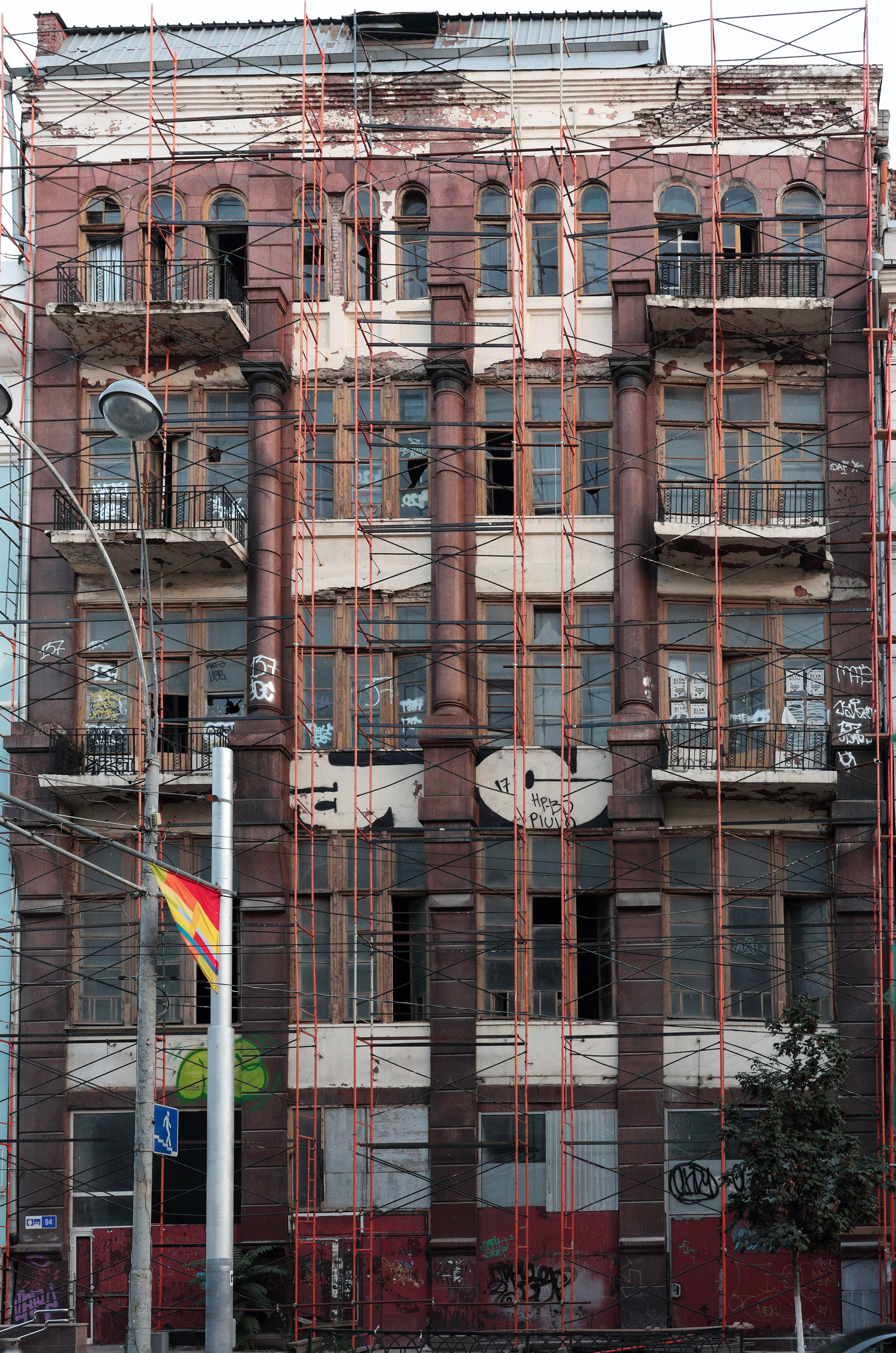
- Interactive map of Sariyev House
- Location: 94 Bolshaya Sadovaya Street, Rostov-on-Don
- Coordinates: 47°13′19″N 39°43′05″E
- Designer: Andrei Fyodorovich Nidermeyer (architect)
- Completion date: 1902

The Sariyev House, or in full the Sariyev revenue house (Russian: Доходный дом Сариевых) or Yemelyanov revenue house (Russian: Доходный дом Емельянова) is an early 20th-century building in the city of Rostov-on-Don. It was designed by architect Andrei Fyodorovich Nidermeyer in the Art Nouveau style, and belonged to the sisters Olga and Elena Sariyev. The house is located at 94 Bolshaya Sadovaya Street. Originally built as a revenue house, the Sariyev House has the status of an object of cultural heritage of regional significance.

== History and description ==
The Sariyev House was built in the late Art Nouveau style, and completed in 1902 with features distinctive to the form that had developed in the city. These include the stone plastering details, namely rusticated granite lesenes and prominent basement belts on the lower sections, and decorative keystones of the first floor windows and upper windows. The building's design incorporated variants of a progressive approach to the structural scheme, which became widespread at the beginning of the 20th century.

The building once housed a library named after Maxim Gorky, before renovations that converted the upper floors into residential apartments. A variety of commercial establishments have occupied the ground floor during the building's history. Prominent during the late Soviet period was the cafe "Shokoladnitsa", a name which came to be commonly applied to the entire building.

== Present status ==
At present, the building is in critical condition with various structurally unsound cracks stretching the length of the façade, historic carvings have eroded beyond the point of recognition, and much of the marble within the building has deteriorated. The building is currently fenced off and covered with scaffolding. A plan to privatize the municipal property was set out at the 42nd meeting of the City Duma, which envisaged the creation of five non-residential premises with a total area of 1399.8 sq. meters. The house was then put up for auction with the obligatory condition of repairing it and installing a commemorative plaque. It was sold for 62 million rubles to Garry Gevorkyan, but the sale fell through after Gevorkyan was denied a bank loan to buy the house.

A serious fire broke out in the house on the night of 22-23 November 2020. The fire spread over 450 square meters, and took more than 20 hours to extinguish. Preliminary reports suggested the cause was "an external introduction", covering both arson and accidental causes. The Sariyev House was auctioned for the fourth time in September 2021, and was sold for 10 thousand rubles to Taganrog resident Shushanik Mkrtchyan. As part of the sale she is required to develop a restoration project and carry out renovation work on the building.
