= Chernova House =

Mansion in Rostov-on-Don, Russia

Coordinates: 47°13′9″N 39°42′8″E

Margarita Chernova House
- Дом Маргариты Черновой
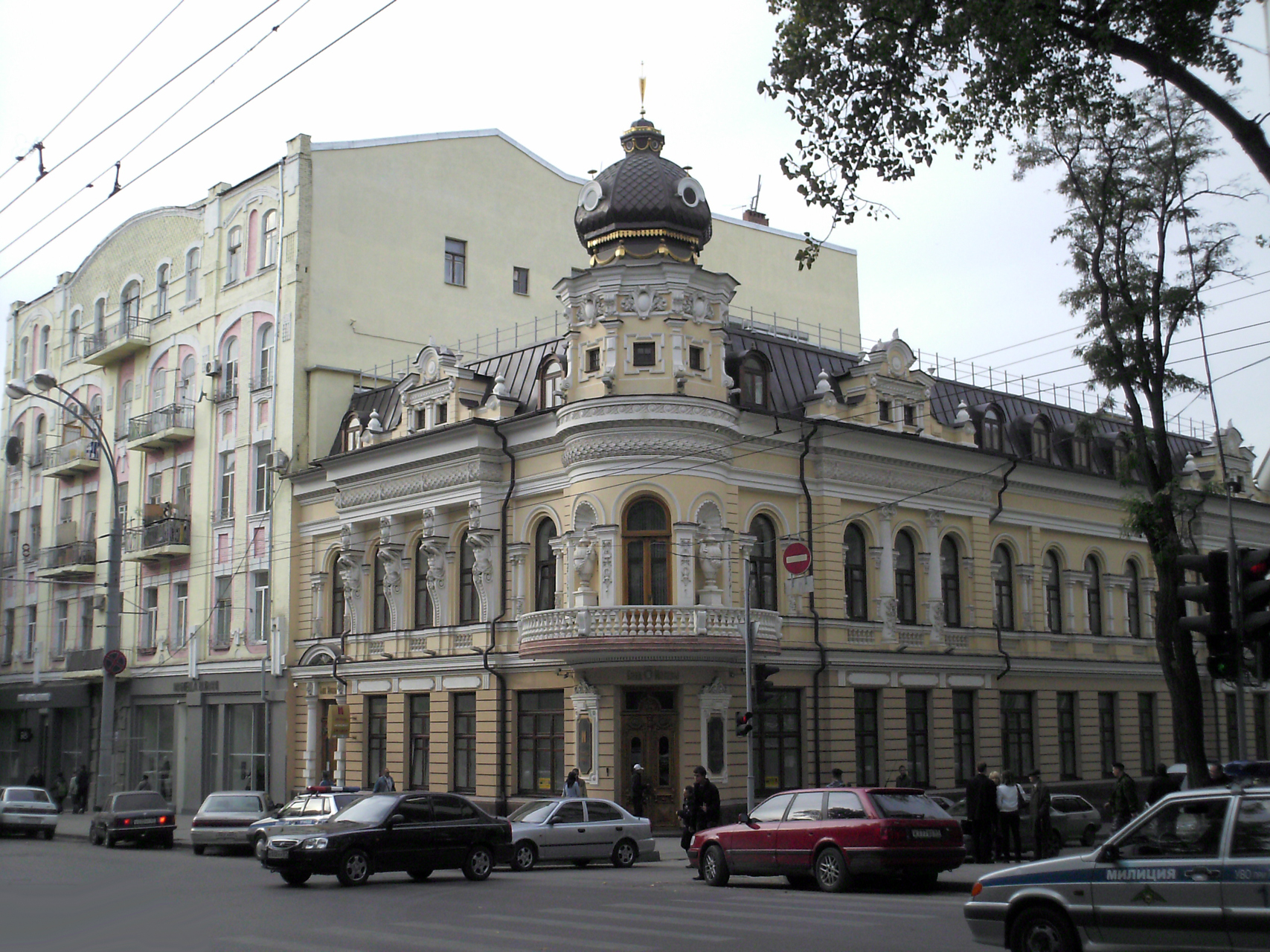
- Established: 1899
- Location: Rostov-on-Don
- Type: Mansion

The Margarita Chernova House (Russian: Дом Маргариты Черновой) is a mansion in the city of Rostov-on-Don, Russia. It was built in 1899 by architect Nikolai Doroshenko. It has the status of an object of cultural heritage of regional importance.

== History ==
After its completion at the end of 19th century and into the beginning of the 20th century, the mansion hosted receptions, musical performances, balls and other events in city life. The ground floor was rented by various trade organizations, including Shamkovich's Pharmacy and the "Julius Garokhov Trading House." The upper floor contained living spaces. The hall of the house had higher ceilings and luxurious interior decoration. A stage was located in the corner of the hall. A balustraded balcony was accessed from the hall. Along the facade facing Khalturinsky Alley was a dining room, a living room, a bedroom, and other premises. Each of the rooms was decorated with stucco painted with oil.

The main entrance to the building is situated at the corner of Bolshaya Sadovaya Street and Khalturinsky Alley. On both sides of the mansion are false windows, decorated with stucco architraves. Above the corner portion rises a belvedere with a cupola, the composite core of the mansion. On the second floor there is a balcony with a balustrade. The facade is richly decorated with stucco: decorative vases in niches, Atlantes, caryatids, medallions, sea shells, garlands and floral ornaments.

In 1920 Chernova was evicted by Soviet authorities, and the building was nationalized. The city's Pharmacy No. 2 occupied the ground floor and basement, with Children's Commune No. 5 occupying the upper floor. Records show that by 1926 the upper floor was occupied by a sewing school, with Pharmacy No. 2 still on the lower floor, along with the newly established joint-stock company Kozhsyryo, and "tenants of nine families in cramped living space: with seven people in one room of the former trading room."

On 2 February 1926 the mansion became the Provincial Prosecutor's Office. Since 1940, the building housed the Communist party archive of the Rostov region, and after the collapse of the Soviet Union ― the State Archives of the Rostov region. By the early 2000s, the building was in disrepair. In 2001, the reconstruction of the building was carried out, during which the house was demolished and reconstructed again. In the process of restoration, the building's original elements were used. Currently, the mansion houses a branch of VTB Bank.

== Gallery ==
Chernova house on postcards

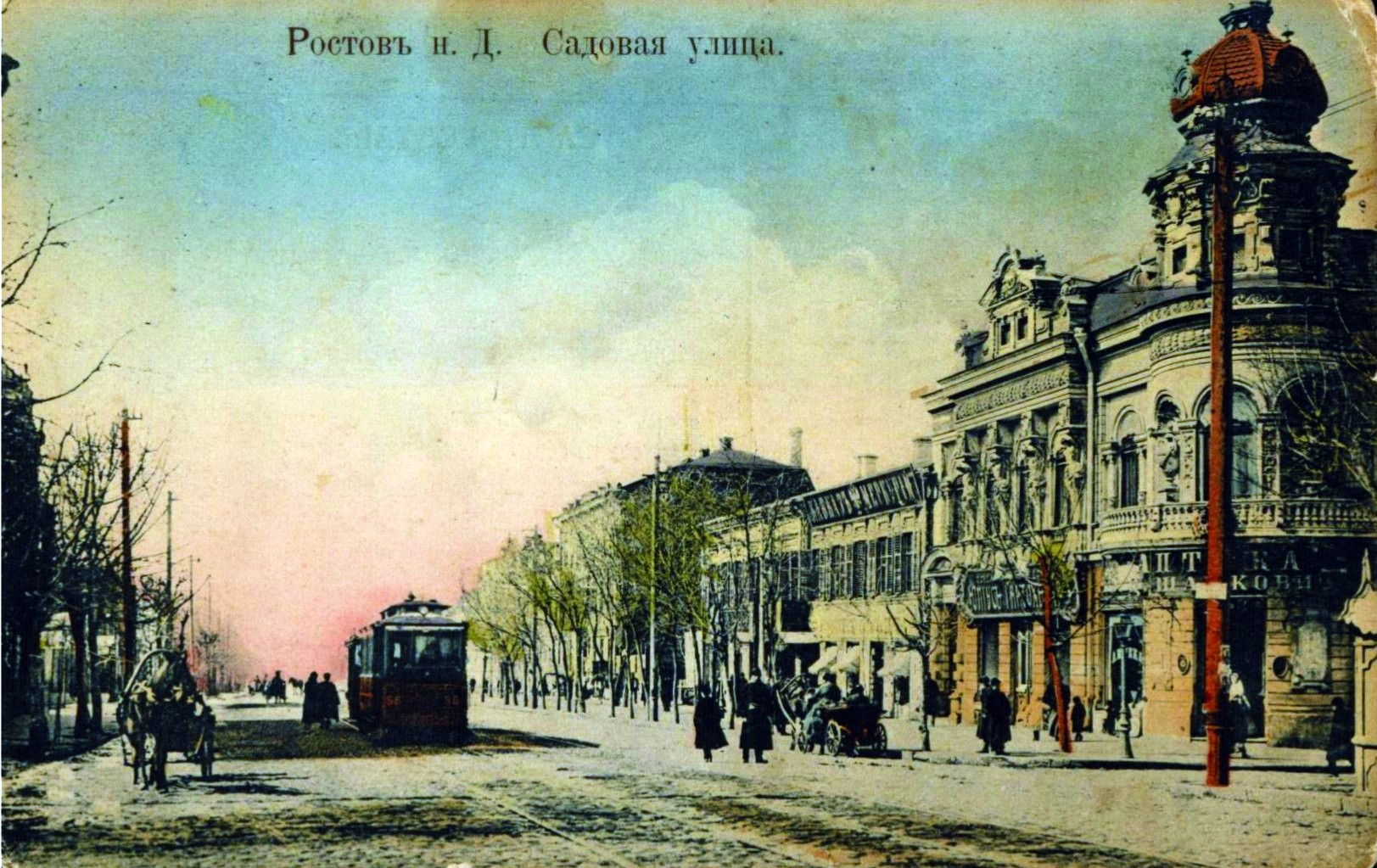
1909

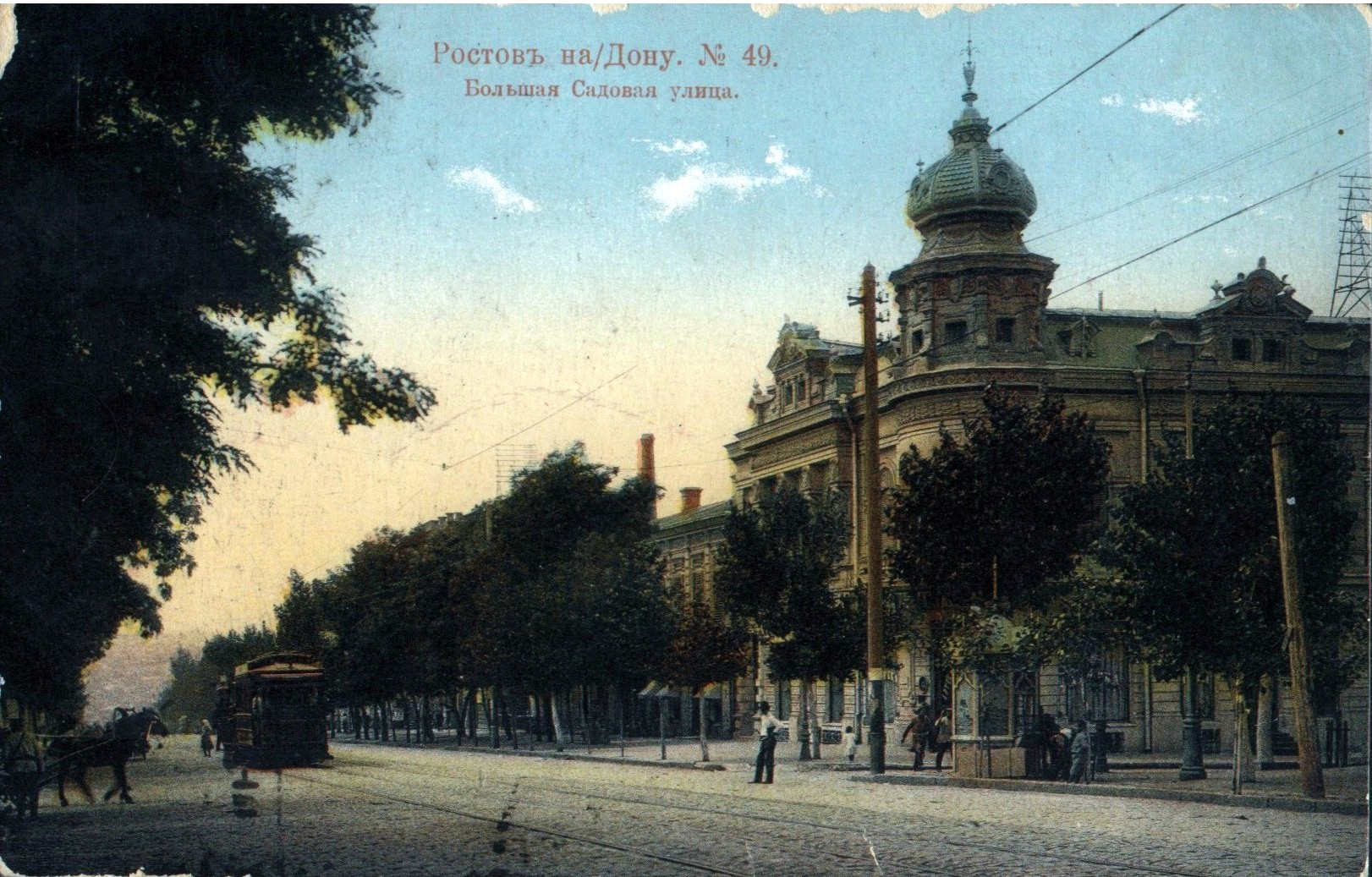
1910

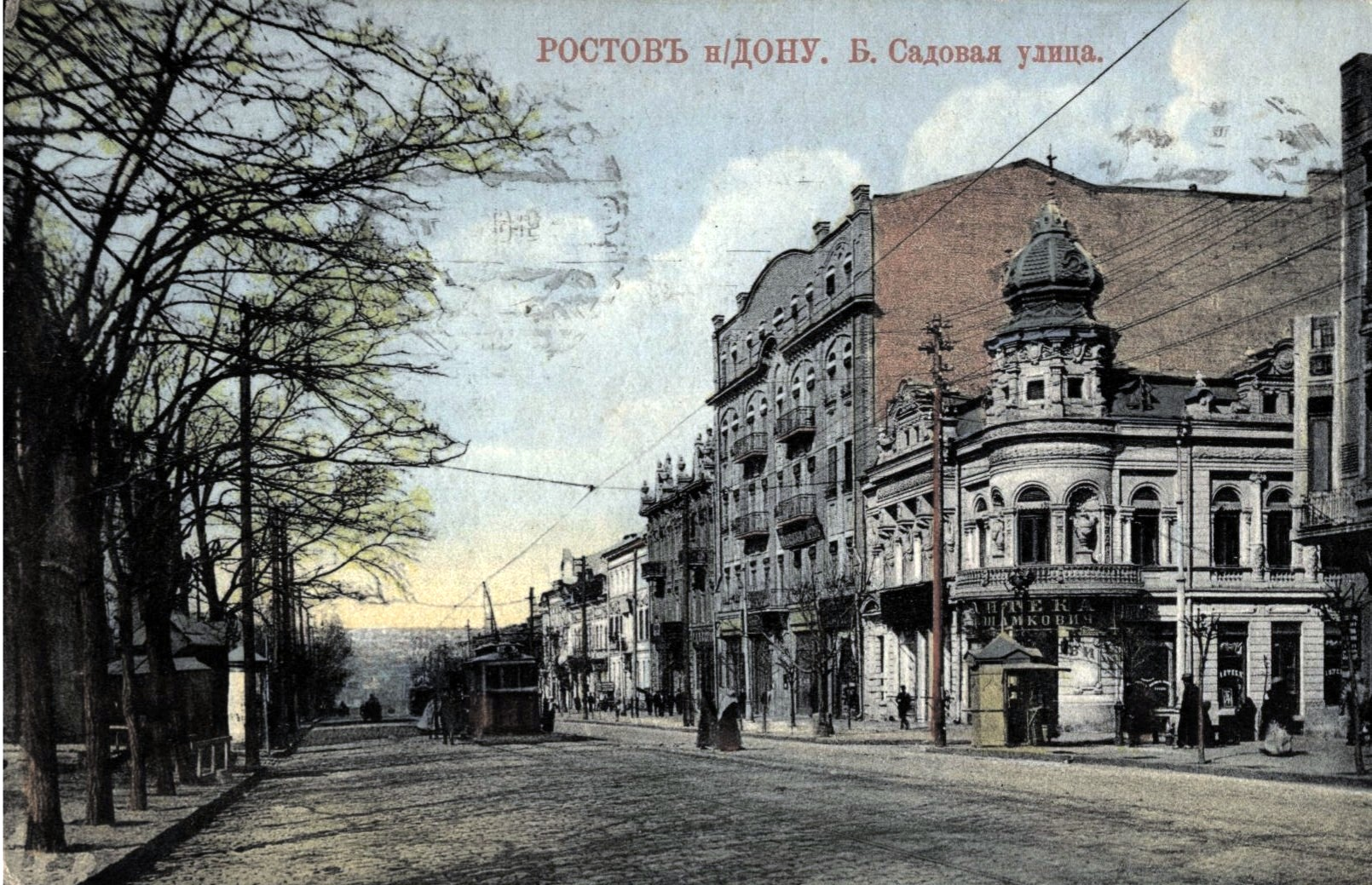
1916
