= Shirman House =

Coordinates: 47°13′25.9″N 39°43′06.4″E

The Shirman House
- Дом Ширмана
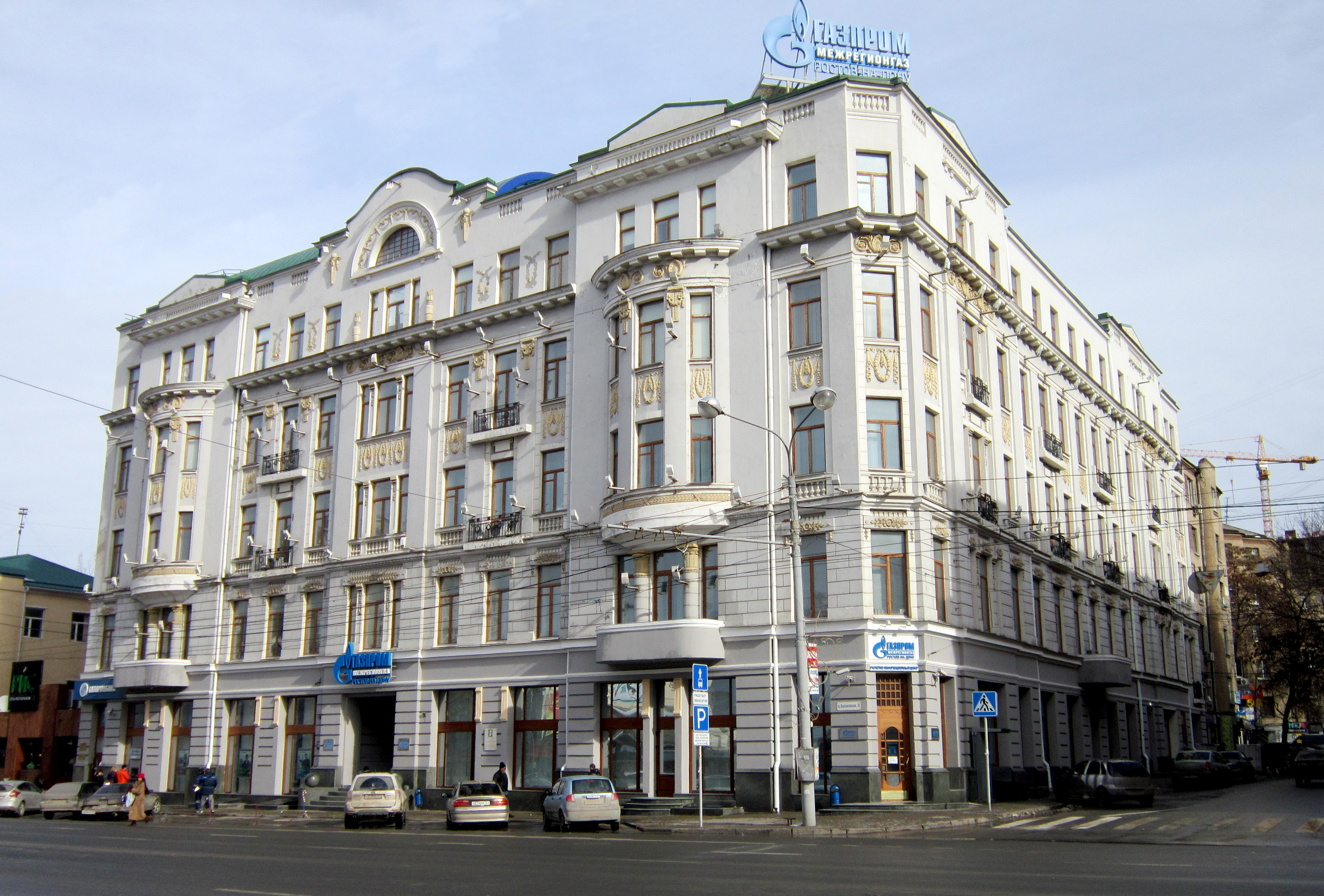
- Shirman House in 2013

General information
- Status: An object of cultural heritage
- Address: Kirovsky District, 20 Voroshilovsky avenue
- Town or city: Rostov-on-Don
- Country: Russia
- Opened: 1911

Design and construction
- Architect(s): Arutun Khristoforovich Zakiev

The Shirman House (Russian: Дом Ширмана, romanized: Dom Shirmana) is an edifice in the Kirovsky District of Rostov-on-Don, Russia. The house is located at 20 Voroshilovsky avenue (Russian: Ворошиловский проспект, 20) at the intersection of Suvorova street and Voroshilovsky avenue. It was a revenue house. The building is also considered to be an object of cultural heritage.

== History ==
The Kushnarev House was built in 1911 upon to a project of Rostov architect Arutun Khristoforovich Zakiev. Dwellings in the Shirman House were rented. The building was nationalized after the establishment of the Soviet rule in 1920. It was turned over to a printing house. Rostov association of proletarian writers and the Molot newspaper correspondents club were accommodated in the building. The first Rostov Pioneer pack was formed here in 1922. Russian poet Vladimir Mayakovsky appeared in the Shirman House on 28 November 1926.

Before the Second World War, the building was turned over to the People's Commissariat for Internal Affairs. After the end of the war, a puppet theater begun to work on the ground floor, Yuzhnaya hotel occupied the upper floors. Two memorial plaques were opened on the facade in 1986. One of them was established in memory of Vladimir Mayakovsky appearance. Another commemorates organization of the first Pioneer pack in Rostov-on-Don. The Shirman House is owned by Gazprom Mezhregiomgaz Rostov-na-Donu LLC currently.

== Description ==
The five-storey brick building was designed in the Art Nouveau style in the early of the 20th century. The facade is decorated with wreaths, flowerpots, attic, bay windows and floral ornament. The first and second floors are decorated with banded rustications. The third and fourth floors have small balconies with delicate iron-cast railing. A cornice above small corbels divides the fourth and fifth floors.
