= Bahchisaraytsev House =

Coordinates: 47°13′09″N 39°42′30″E

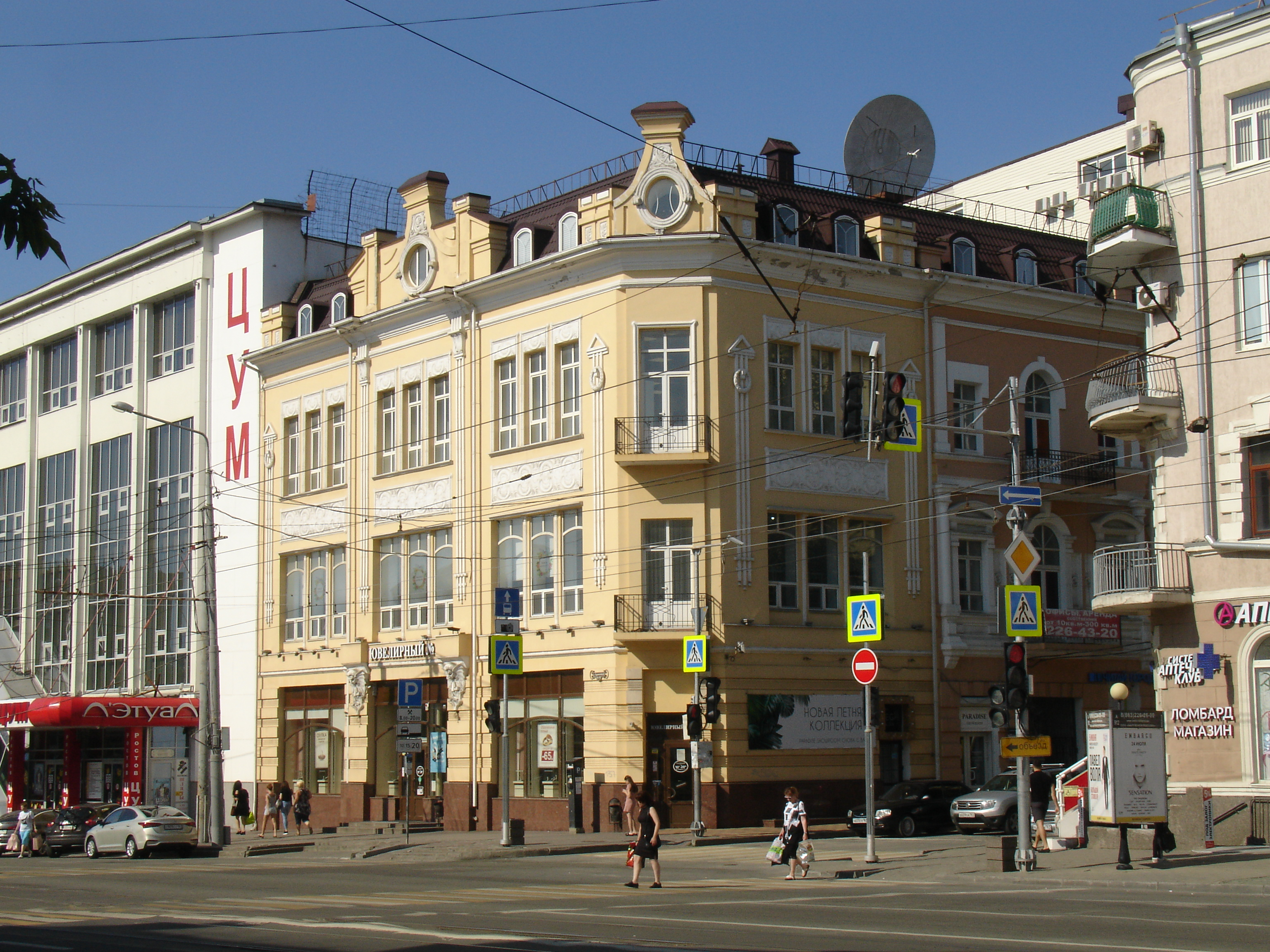
The Bahchisaraytsev House in 2020

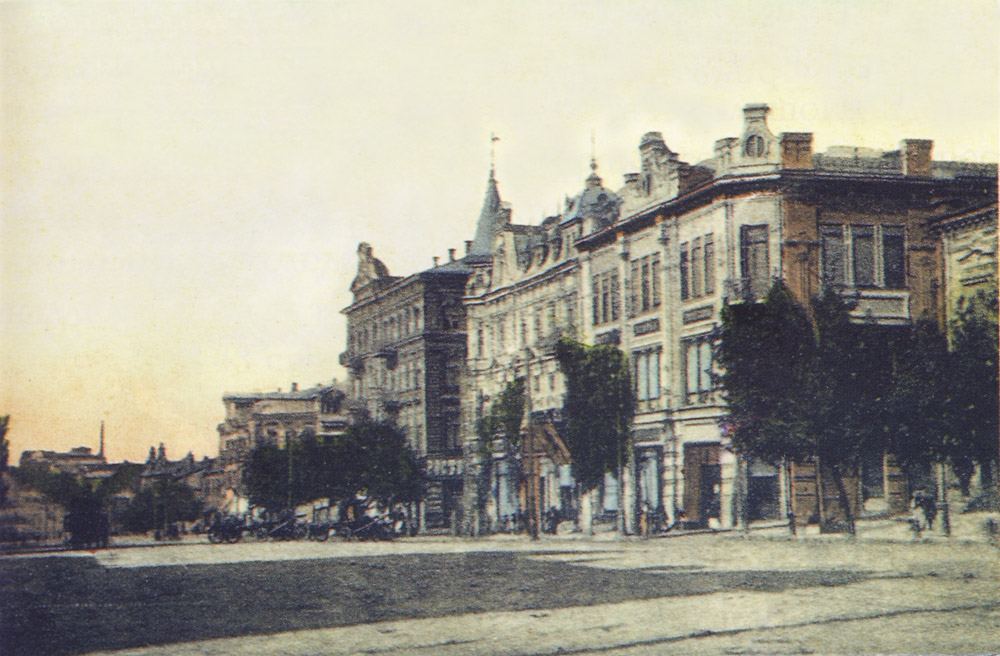
The Bahchisaraytsev House before 1917

The Bahchisaraytsev House (Russian: Дом Бахчисарайцева, romanized: Dom Bahchisaraytseva) is a historic house in Rostov-on-Don, Russia located at the intersection of Socialist street and Budenovsky Prospekt (Pr. Budennovsky, 26/57).

Built in the early twentieth century, the house belonged to Grigory Bahchisaraystev, a public official of the Rostov City Duma. His name is given as Krikor Bahchisaraystev in appraisal documents and in the list of cultural heritage objects of regional importance in Rostov-on-Don. Bahchisaraystev was a well-known amateur gardener in the city, and in 1910 organized the city's first tree planting festival.

The building has the status of an object of cultural heritage of Russia of regional significance.

== History ==
The building was built in the Art Nouveau style in the early twentieth century. A characteristic feature of the tenement houses of the late nineteenth – early twentieth centuries is the location of the commercial premises on the ground floor of the building. The first floor of the house was rented by the commercial and industrial company "Zveno", which was engaged in the sale of Loreley cars made by the "Rudolf Ley" joint stock company.

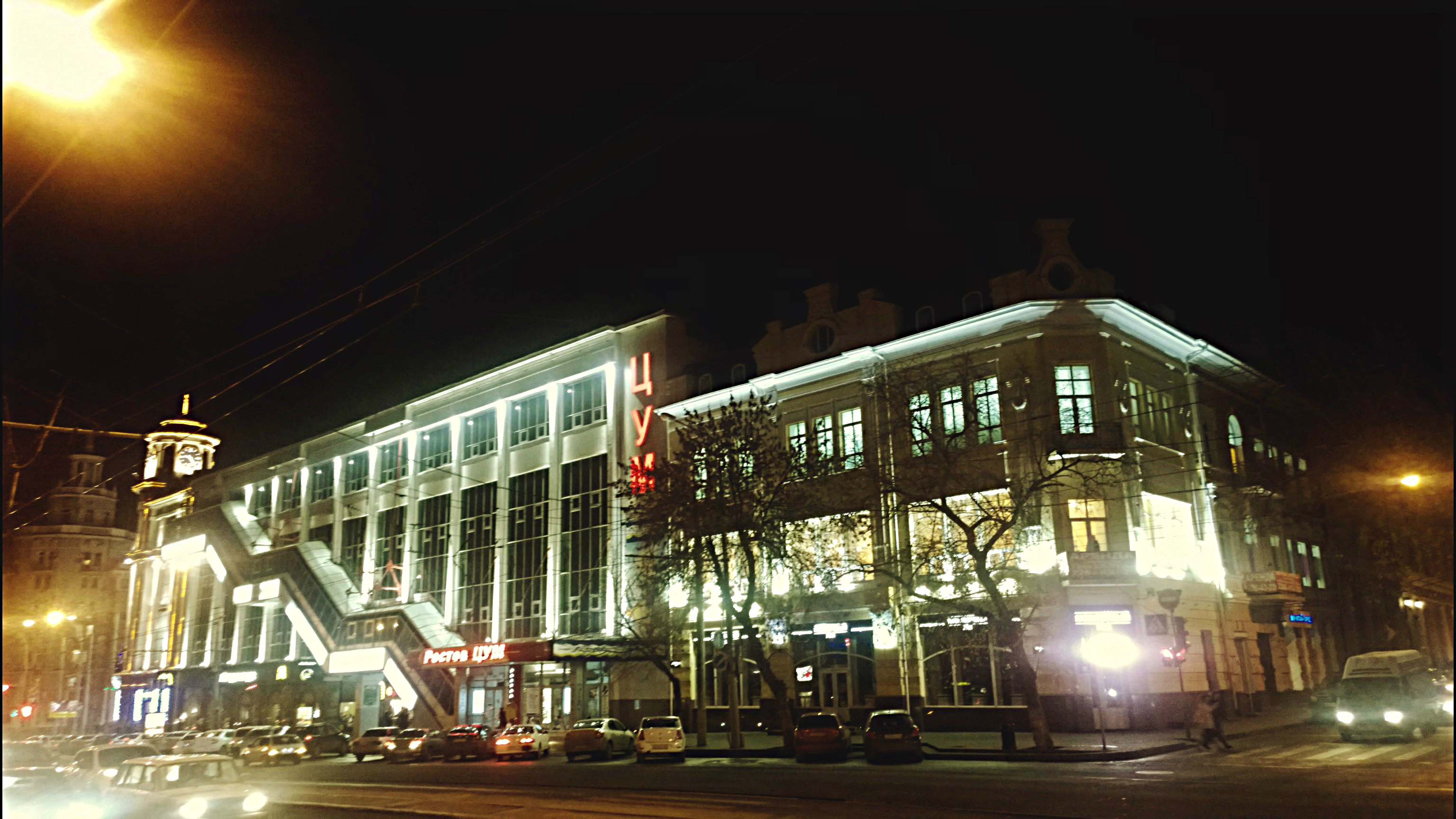
Night view of Bakhchisaraytsev House

In the 1920s, the building was nationalized — the upper floors were reserved for residential purposes, and a student canteen occupied the basement.
