= Chernoyarova House =

Mansion in Taganrog, Rostov Oblast, Russia

Coordinates: 47.1230°N 38.5634°E

- Дом Чернояровой
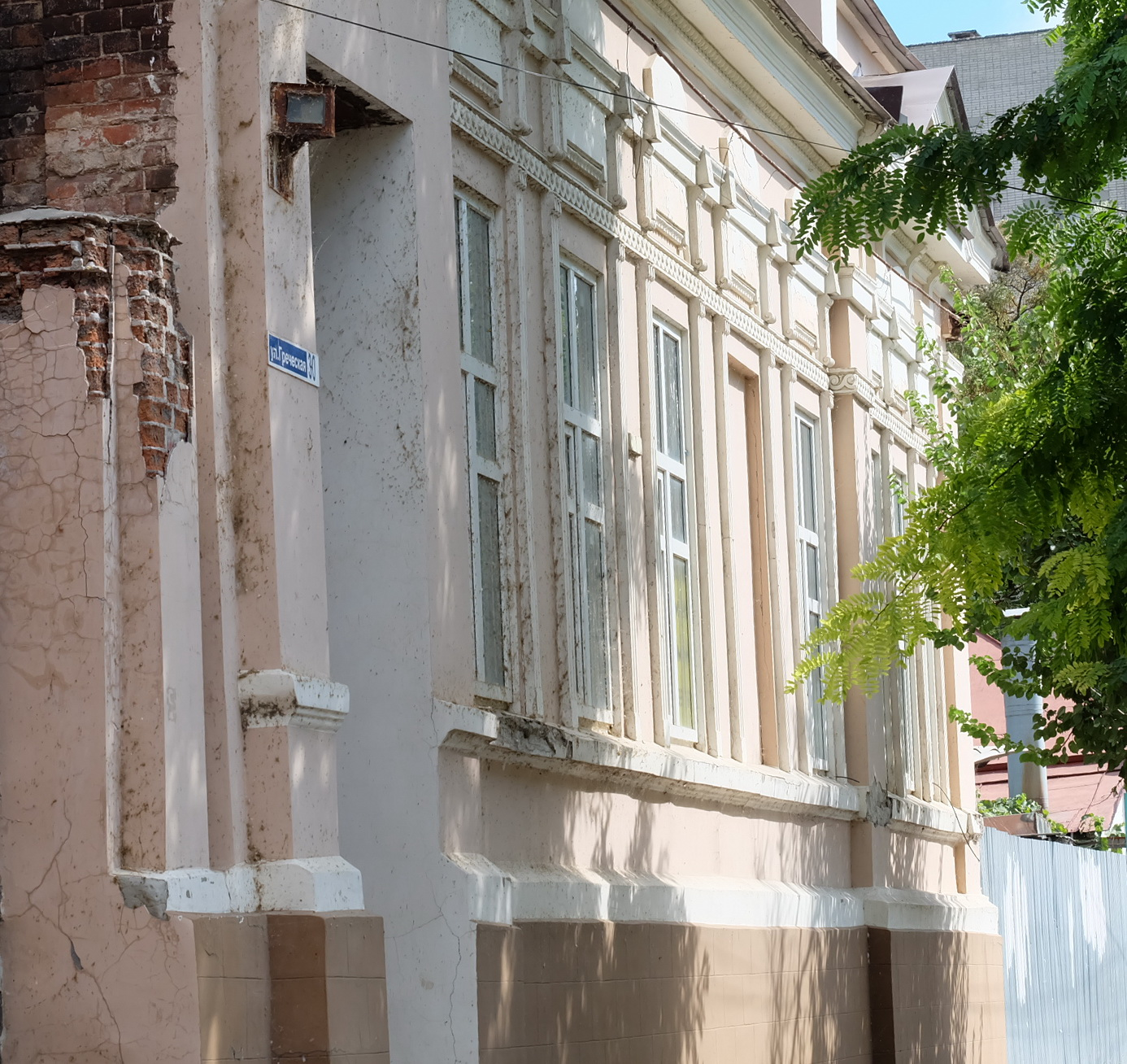
- Established: second half of XIX century
- Location: Taganrog
- Type: Mansion

Chernoyarova House (Russian: Дом Чернояровой) is an old mansion in Taganrog, built in the second half of the 19th century. It is officially declared as an object of cultural heritage of Russia of Regional importance.

== History ==
The one-storey house on Grecheskaya Street in Taganrog was built in the second half of the 19th century. At the end of the 19th century an at the beginning of the 20th century, starting from Chernoyarova House and further, up to the Dvortsovy alley, the right side of Grecheskaya Street began to be built up by capital structures in accordance with the recommendations from the Collection of facades of His Imperial Majesty, approved by Emperor of Russia for private buildings in the cities of the Russian Empire.

Chernoyarova House before Revolution of 1917 was the property of the nobleman's wife, Olga Nikolaevna Chernoyarova. Her husband, Alexei Fedorovich, retired major general, died on 20 May 1910, at the age of 80.

During the Soviet era, the building was nationalized.

== Architecture ==
The house has five windows on the side of the facade. The house is built of brick in an asymmetric form. It has a gable roof, and the side walls have windows without ornaments. The basement of the building is painted dark-brown, the first floor ― in light brown, small architectural elements are highlighted in white. The building has an inter-floor cornice. The three right narrow windows are decorated with Pilasters; a triangular pediment and an attic stand out above the windows. The facade of the building is plastered, its side walls are lined with red brick.

== Literature ==
- Гаврюшкин О. П. По старой Греческой... (Хроника обывательской жизни). — Таганрог: Лукоморье, 2003. — 514 с. — ISBN 5-901565-15-0.
