= Soviet South building =

Building in Rostov-on-Don, Russia

The building of the newspaper "Soviet South"
- Здание редакции газеты «Советский Юг»
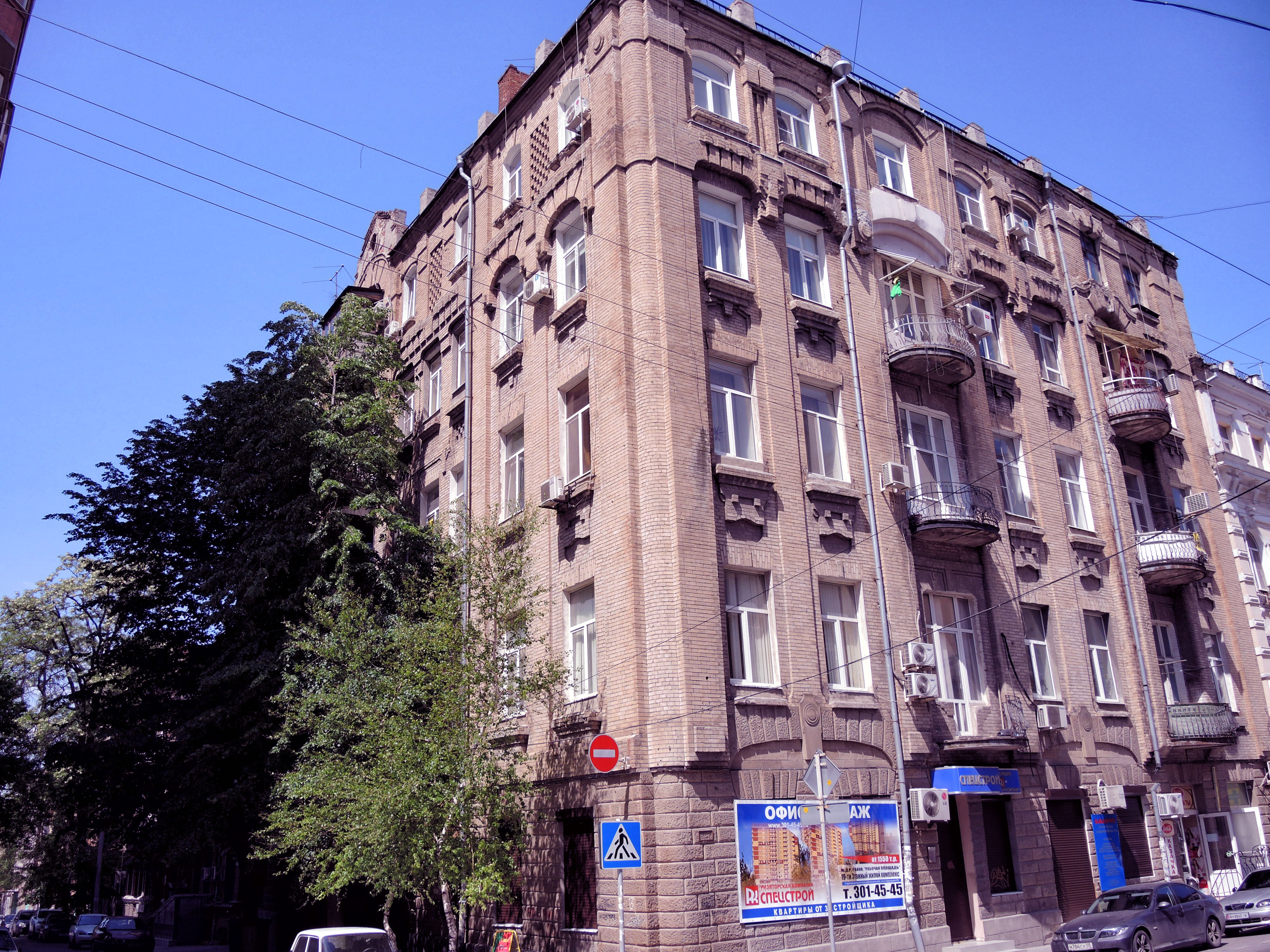
- 47.2186°N 39.7025°E
- Location: Rostov-on-Don, Russia
- Opening date: 1911

The building of the newspaper Soviet South (Russian: Здание редакции газеты «Советский Юг») is a building in Rostov-on-Don which was built in 1911 in the Art Nouveau style. It is located on the intersection of Khalturinsky lane and Shaumyan street. The building has the status of an object of cultural heritage of regional significance.

== History of the building ==
The Soviet South building was built in 1911 as a revenue house commissioned by the merchant A. A. Levanidov.

Since the mid-1920s, the offices of the regional newspapers Sovetsky Yug (Russian: Советский Юг) and Komsomolets (Russian: Комсомолец) were located on the top floor of the house. There, next to the working rooms, in the room with a view of the Don River, lived writer A. A. Fadeev. In 1959, in memory of this, a memorial plaque with the text was installed on the facade: "Here in 1924-1926 worked in the editorial board of the Soviet South writer Fadeyev Alexander Alexandrovich (1901-1956). Living in this house, he wrote a famous novel, The Rout (Russian: Разгром)."

Currently, the building is residential. On the ground floor there are shops.
