= Argutinsky-Dolgorukov House =

Art Nouveau edifice in Rostov-on-Don, Russia

Coordinates: 47°13′05″N 39°41′56.4″E

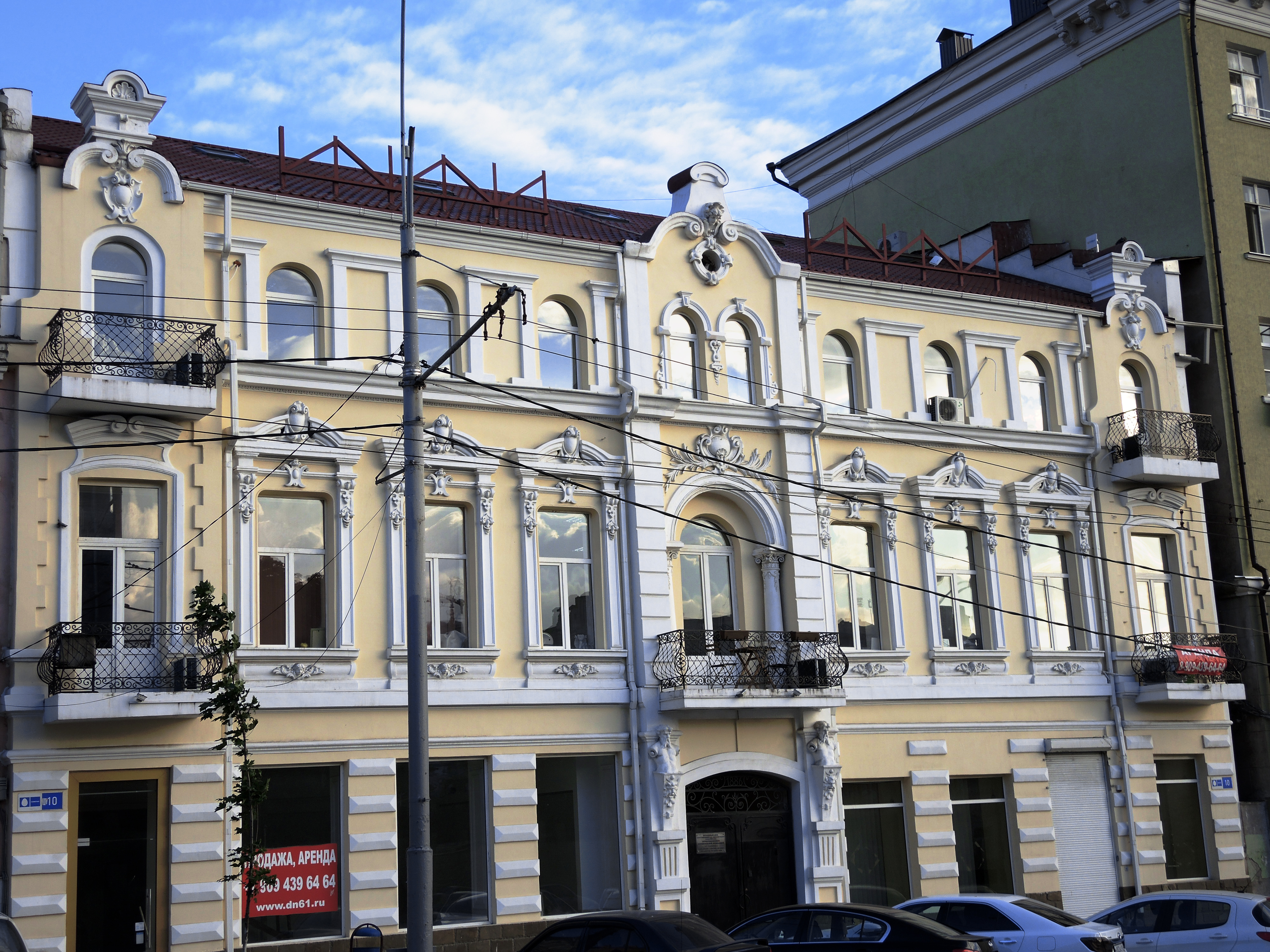
Argutinsky-Dolgorukov House

The Argutinsky-Dolgorukov House (Russian: Дом Аргутинского-Долгорукова, romanized: Dom Argutinskovo-Dolgorukova) is an Art Nouveau edifice in the Leninsky City District of Rostov-on-Don, Russia. The house is located at 10 Bolshaya Sadovaya Street (Russian: Большая Садовая улица, 10). The building has the status of an object of cultural heritage of Russia of regional significance.

== History ==
The Argutinsky-Dolgorukov House was erected in the last quarter of the 19th century. Shops were located in the ground floor of the building. Dwellings occupied the second and the third floors. The building was nationalized after the 1917 October Revolution and the establishment of Soviet rule. The building has since undergone numerous redevelopments that have changed the interior space. In 1996, the main façade was renovated without a restoration project. In 2004 the construction company Slavyane undertook restoration work for the 255th anniversary of Rostov-on-Don, since commemorated by a plaque on the building. Currently, the former apartment building houses a shop and offices.

== Description ==
The three-storey building was designed in the Art Nouveau style in the end of the 19th century. It is part of historic urban development on Bolshaya Sadovaya street. The architecture of the building employs baroque and classical elements of decoration. The facade is decorated with attics and banded central and side rustications. Second-floor rectangular windows are crowned with segmental cornices with reliefs. The second floor has small balconies with delicate iron-cast railing. The columns of the central arch use composite Corinthian order. The entrance to the yard is decorated with two atlantes.
