= Tokarev House =

Edifice in the Kirovsky District of Rostov-on-Don, Russia

Coordinates: 47°13′24.4″N 39°43′28.4″E

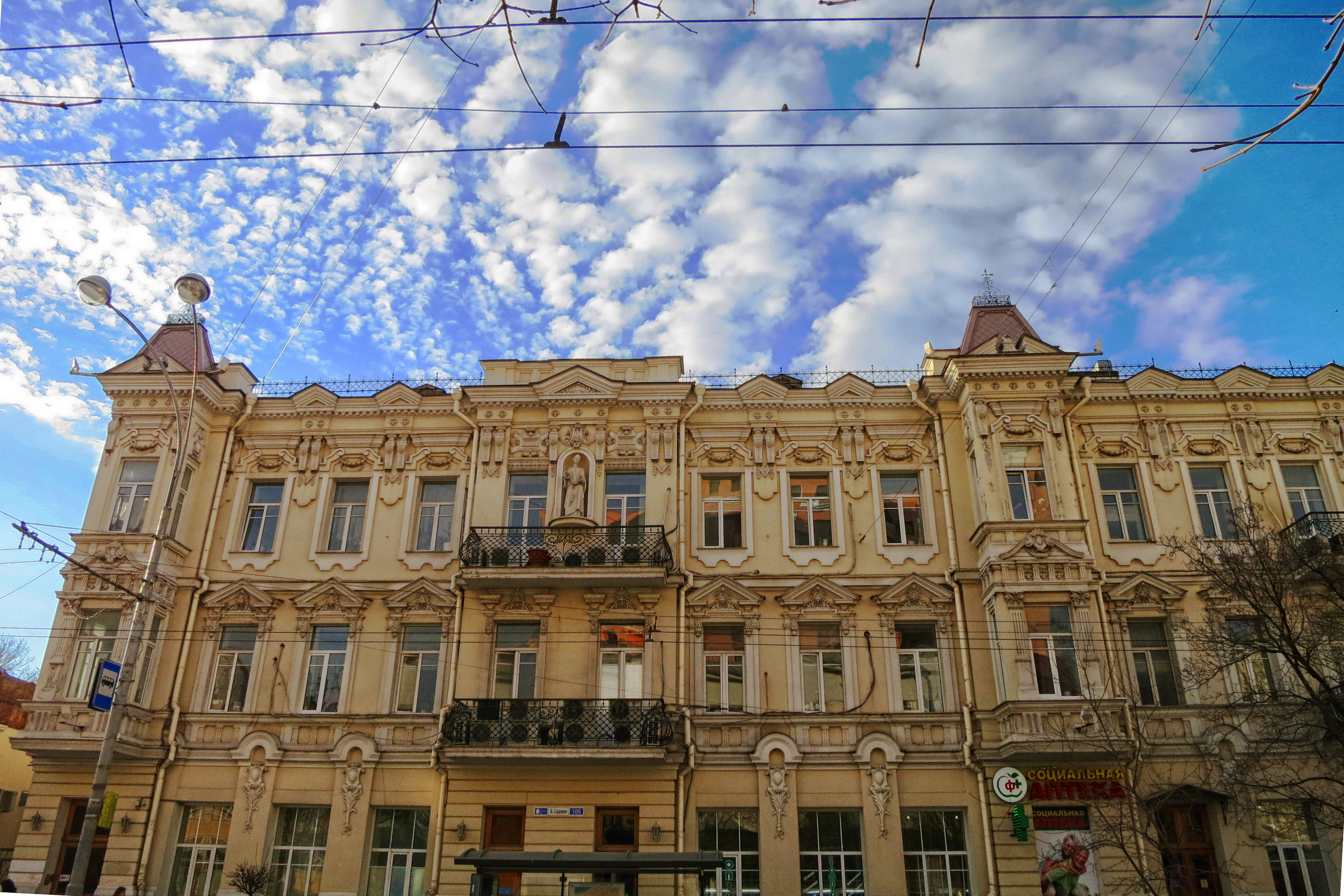
Tokarev House

The Tokarev House (Russian: Дом Токарева, romanized: Dom Tokareva) is an edifice in the Kirovsky District of Rostov-on-Don, Russia. The house is located at 106 Bolshaya Sadovaya street (Russian: Большая Садовая улица, 106) at the intersection of Chekhova avenue and Bolshaya Sadovaya street. It was a revenue house. The building is also considered to be an object of cultural heritage.

== History ==
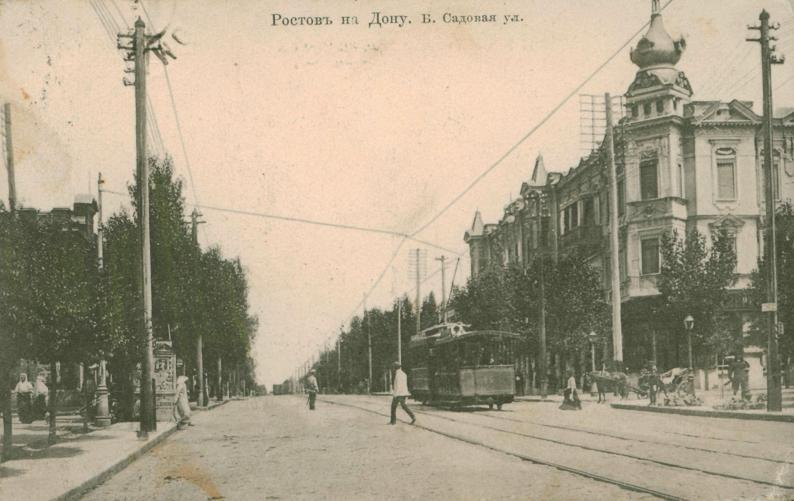
The Tokarev House (on the right) between 1905 and 1917

The Tokarev House was built in 1905. It was built by order of Rostov merchant Nikilay Ilyich Tokarev. He owned a distillery in Rostov-on-Don. Dwellings in the building were rented. Before the revolution of 1917, Babakhanov grocery shop, Russian dramatic society, milk food store, Rosenblum pharmaceutical warehouse occupied the ground floor.

The building was nationalized after the establishment of the Soviet rule in 1920. The city hospital No.10 was accommodated in the building. The Tokarev House was not affected during the Second World War. The wife of Sir Winston Churchill Clementine Churchill stayed here during her visit to Rostov-on-Don in 1945. The restoration of the building according to a project of Y. Solnyshkin took place at the end of the 1990s and was held in conjunction with the 250-year anniversary of Rostov-on-Don. The main contractor was the institute Spetsrestovratsiya. The Tokarev House is currently employed as the city hospital No 10.

== Description ==
The building was designed in the Beaux-Arts style. The architecture of the Tokarev House employs baroque, rococo and classic elements of decoration. These include tented roofs, moldings, small corbels and architraves. The first floor is decorated with banded rustications. Windows of the second floor are crowned with triangular cornices. A female figure is established in the central niche on the third floors. The central windows on the second and third floor have small balconies with delicate cast iron railing. The cornice is crowned with parapet established between decorative pedestals.
