= Rosokhrankultura =

State agency of Russia

- Федеральная служба по надзору за соблюдением законодательства в области охраны культурного наследия

Agency overview
- Formed: 12 May 2008
- Dissolved: 8 February 2011
- Jurisdiction: Government of Russia
- Headquarters: Moscow
- Parent agency: Ministry of Culture of Russia

Rosokhrankultura (Russian: Росохранкультура), full name: Federal Service for monitoring compliance with cultural heritage protection law (Russian: Федеральная служба по надзору в сфере массовых коммуникаций, связи и охраны культурного наследия), is a state agency of Russia responsible for keeping the national register of cultural heritage, enforcing preservation of listed properties through monitoring compliance with preservation law and enforcing compliance with copyright law, including licensing of copyright management agencies.

It has been operating in this form since 12 May 2008, when it was reorganized from the Federal Service for Supervision of Mass Communications, Communications and Protection of Cultural Heritage (Rossvyazokhrankultura) (Russian: Федеральная служба по надзору в сфере массовых коммуникаций, связи и охраны культурного наследия (Россвязьохранкультура)), (Note: After the Ministry of Press, Broadcasting and Mass Communications of the Russian Federation (Russian: Министерство по делам печати, телерадиовещания и средств массовых коммуникаций) was disbanded and its former leader from 6 July 1999 until 9 March 2004 Mikhail Lesin became adviser to the president and Lesin's former deputy and protégé Mikhail Seslavinsky headed the Press Agency also known as the Federal Agency for Press and Mass Communications (Russian: Федеральное агентство по печати и массовым коммуникациям) was formed on 9 March 2004 with Mikhail Vadimovich Seslavinsky (Russian: Михаил Вадимович Сеславинский) as its head until 20 November 2020. From a decree dated 7 March 2007, the Federal Service for Supervision of Mass Communications, Communications and Protection of Cultural Heritage (Rossvyazokhrankultura) (Russian: Федеральная служба по надзору в сфере массовых коммуникаций, связи и охраны культурного наследия (Россвязьохранкультура)) was formed with Boris Boyarskov its head and Sergey Sitnikov its deputy head.) (Note: Boris Antonovich Boyarskov (Russian: Борис Антонович Боярсков; 9 July 1953, Leningrad), who headed Rossvyazokhrankultura from 22 March 2007 until 2 June 2008, is alleged to be a retired KGB general. In 1976, he graduated from the Polytechnic Institute. M.I. Kalinina and majored in metallurgical engineering later working at the machine at the "Red October" (Russian: "Красный Октябрь") Leningrad Machine-Building Plant. He became was a member of the KGB and worked in the Leningrad region. From 1991 to 1994, he was the Deputy Chairman of the Kuibyshev District Council of People's Deputies in Leningrad. He worked with Sergey Rodionov and headed security at Imperial Bank later becoming a branch manager, then was at the Bank Evrofinance from 1994 until 2001 as a Deputy Governor in Saint Petersburg, and, later, became a vice president of investment Programs for Bank Evrofinance in Moscow from 2001 to 2004. Through his financing endeavors at Evrofinance, he successfully transitioned media outlets in Russia from the Yeltsin era to the Saint Petersburg and Putin era. He studied at the Institute of the Higher School of Economics (Russian: Банковский институт Высшей школы экономики) earning an MBA in finance in 2004. Then, in April 2004, he entered federal service as the Acting Director of the Department of Licensing Work Ministry of Culture and, while in this position, he ensured that St. Petersburg – Channel 5 would receive a license as a new nationwide television station using persons close to Putin from Bank Rossiya, which is called the "president's wallet." Boyarskov's protégé Igor Nikolaevich Fyodorov (Russian: Игорь Николаевич Фёдоров; born 9 September 1955, Leningrad, Soviet Union), who, in 1977, graduated from the State University of Latvia with a degree in Journalism, in 1993 completed courses under the program "Fundamentals of Foreign Economic Activity" at the Academy of Foreign Trade of the Ministry of Foreign Economic Relations of the Russian Federation (Russian: Академии внешней торговли МВЭС РФ); from 1977 to 1987 was the Editor of the Main Editorial Office of the Broadcasting for Fishermen of the Western Basin "Atlantika" of the Television and Radio Broadcasting Committee of the Latvian SSR; from 1987 to 1989 was the Editor of the Main Information Editorial Office of the All-Union Radio; from 1989 to 1990 was the Editor of the Main Editorial Office of Foreign Information of TASS; from 1990 to 1992 was the TASS correspondent in Peru; from 1992 to 1996 was the Senior Expert, Chief Expert of the Public Relations Department of the Chamber of Commerce and Industry of the Russian Federation; from 1996 to 1998 was the Head of the Strategic Analysis Department of the Integrated Market Analysis Department of Imperial Law Firm; from 1998 to 2000 was the Head of the Department of Corporate Programs of the Information Holding "Concern "Systems "Mass Media"; from October 2005 headed the Public Chamber of Russia (Russian: Общественной палаты России), also worked at Evrofinance from 2000-2001 as the Head of the Public Relations and Corporate Programs Group, and then under the leadership of Boyarskov at Rosokhrankultura, was with the new Central Election Commission (CEC) or Centrizbircom (Russian: Центральная избирательная комиссия (ЦИК) или Центризбирком). Later, Boyarskov moved from licensing to be the head Rossvyaznadzor.) (Note: Sergei Sitnikov (Russian: Сергей Ситников) was Boris Borsakov's deputy at Rossvyazokhrankultura. Sitnikov rose through ranks of Komsomol and, in 1998, he headed the Kostroma State Television and Radio Company (Russian: Костромская государственная телерадиокомпания) that later became a branch of VGTRK. From 2002 to 2004, when he was deputy general director of Radio Baltica (Russian: «Радио Балтика») in St. Petersburg, and, according to some reports, Sitnikov became closely acquainted with the head of the Baltic Media Group (Russian: Балтийская Медиа Группа) and the prominent businessman Oleg Konstantinovich Rudnov (Russian: Олег Константинович Руднов) who, until Rudnov's death in 2015, was very close to Sergei Roldugin, Vladimir Putin, Bank Rossiya, and Yuri Kovalchuk.) created on 12 March 2007 through the merger of the Federal Service for Supervision of Compliance with Legislation in the Field of Mass Communications and the Protection of Cultural Heritage (Rosokhrankultura) and the Federal Service for Supervision in the Field of Communications (Rossvyaznadzor).

As of May 2009, the agency is subordinated to the federal Ministry of Culture. For a brief period in 2008 Rosokhrankultura was merged into the Russian Federal Surveillance Service for Mass Communications, Communications but was eventually reorganized back into an independent agency. It is chaired, since June 2008, by Alexander Vladimirovich Kibovsky (Russian: Александр Владимирович Кибовский; born 15 November 1973, Moscow), historian of Imperial Russian Army and a lecturer on military costume at the Moscow Art Theatre college.

In September 2008 Rosokhrankultura performed a survey of damages of the 2008 South Ossetia War in South Ossetia.
