= Revenue house =

European multi-family residence

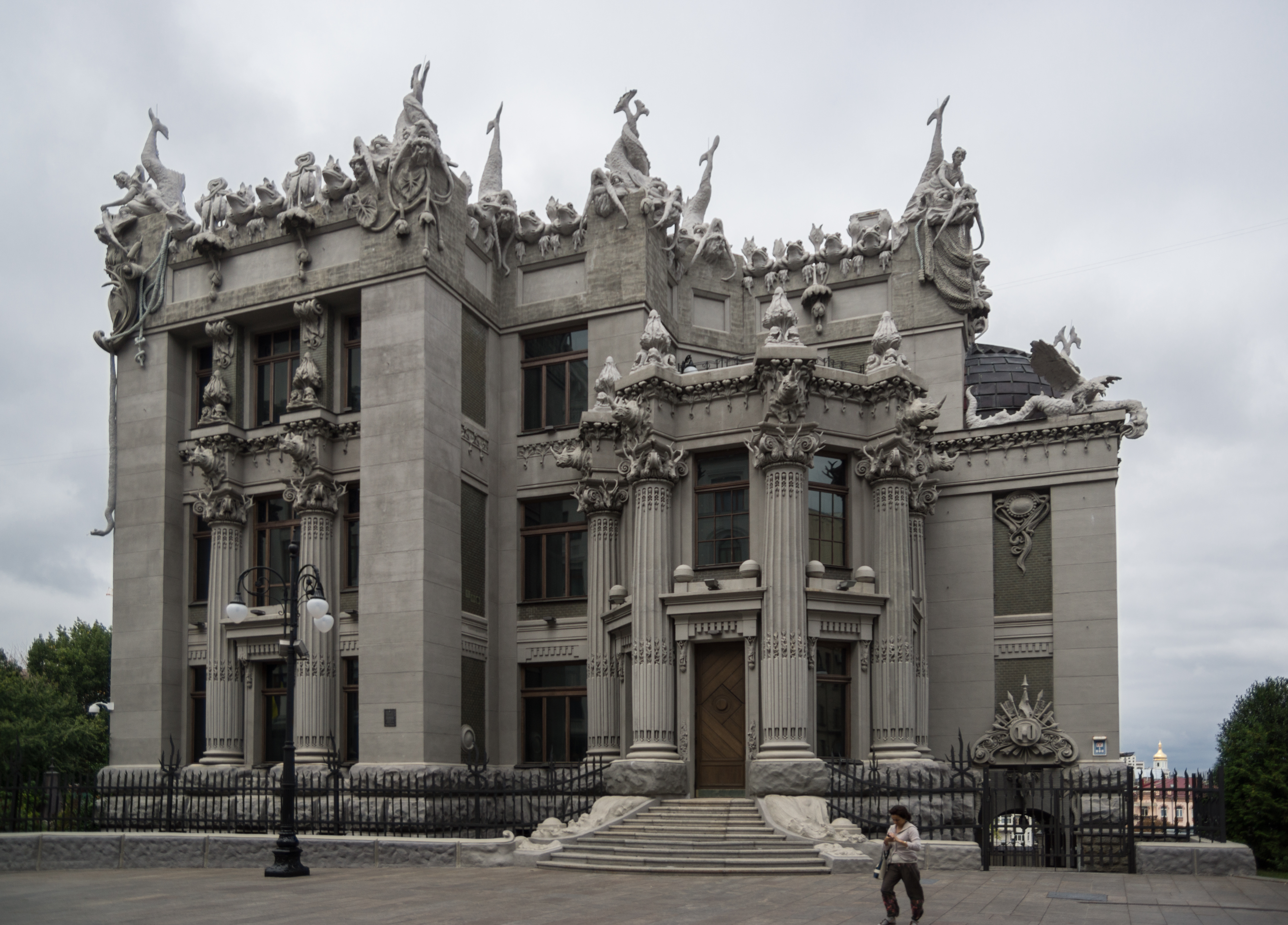
House with Chimaeras, Kyiv, Ukraine. Built in 1902 as a revenue house, it has been the presidential residence since 2005

A revenue house is a type of multi-family residential house with specific architecture which evolved in Europe during 18th–19th centuries and became a precursor of what is now known as a rental apartment house and a tenement. In various European countries this type of house was known as immeuble de rapport, hôtel de rapport (France); inmueble de inversión, inmueble de alquiler (Spain), доходный дом (Russian Empire), etc.

In France, the spreading of the revenue houses started since the reign of Louis XVI. Over time, it became a popular investment by real estate developers, which resulted in repeated use of the same type of façades and overall architecture of the buildings. The proliferation of this kind of property is responsible for the uniformity of the architecture of Paris today.
