= Russian cultural heritage register =

Registry of places of historical or cultural significance in the Russian Federation

Cultural Heritage Register of Russia
- Website type: Government agency site
- Available in: Russian
- Owner: Ministry of Culture
- Revenue: Non-commercial
- Website: opendata.mkrf.ru/opendata
- Registration: No (read-only access)

The national cultural heritage register of Russia (Russian: Единый государственный реестр объектов культурного наследия) is a registry of historically or culturally significant man-made immovable properties – landmark buildings, industrial facilities, memorial homes of notable people of the past, monuments, cemeteries and tombs, archaeological sites and cultural landscapes – man-made environments and natural habitats significantly altered by humans. The register continues a tradition established in 1947 and is governed by a 2002 law "On the objects of cultural heritage (monuments of culture and history)" (Law 73-FZ). The register is maintained by the Federal Service for Monitoring Compliance with Cultural Heritage Legislation (a branch of the federal Ministry of Culture); the publicly available online database is hosted by the Ministry of Culture. Its primary purpose is to aggregate the regional heritage registers maintained by the federal subjects of Russia, monitor the state of heritage objects and compliance with relevant laws.

The legal framework of the register, as of May 2009, remains incomplete and the register itself is not yet matched to lists of protected buildings maintained by regional and municipal authorities. It includes around 100,000 items while the local lists total in excess of 140,000. Of these 42,000 are rated as national landmarks, while the rest are of regional or local significance. The Ministry of Culture admits that many items on the registers have been destroyed.

Natural landmarks and reserves (apart from cultural landscapes), movable art, archives, museum and library collections are not part of the register and are governed by different laws and agencies. A different listing, State Code of Particularly Valuable Objects of Cultural Heritage of the Peoples of the Russian Federation, created in 1992, includes the most conspicuous man-made landmarks as well as operating institutions: museums, archives, theatres, universities and academies.

== Background ==
=== Early records (1805–1861) ===
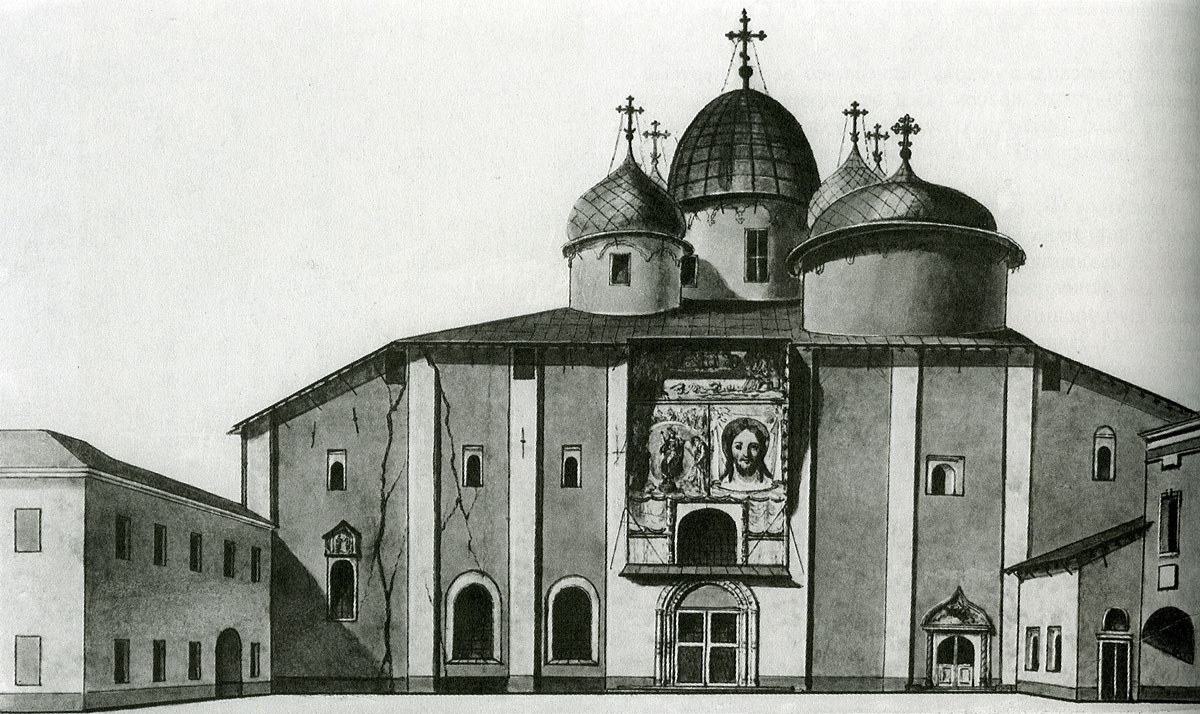
Preservation efforts of the 1830s were limited to undisputed relics like the 11th century Saint Sophia Cathedral in Novgorod. This architectural drawing was made in 1830, prior to restoration.

Local heritage registers in the Russian Empire extend to 1805, when Alexander I demanded state protection of archaeological sites on the recently conquered Black Sea coast. These Greek, Genoan and Tatar relics in sparsely populated steppes were regularly looted by treasure hunters. In 1821 minister Alexander Golitsyn limited the scope of protection to Greek and Genoan heritage and denied protection to Tatar and Ottoman buildings. Requirements for a scientific heritage register were formulated in 1823 by Ivan Stempkovsky and enforced by governor Vorontsov.

In 1826, emperor Nicholas I decreed compilation of Russia's first nationwide register of architectural "antiquities". The decree prohibited demolition of historical "castles, fortresses and other ancient buildings", imposed local governors' responsibility for their preservation and required them to compile lists of notable local properties, backed by archive research and where qualified architects were available, by proper architectural drawings of their facades and floorplans. Churches were omitted from the decree, – Nicholas at that time did not want to interfere with clergy; a similar but less strict decree on religious heritage was issued in 1828.

Nicholas did not explain what, specifically, constituted protected buildings, so initial responses from the provinces listed both pre-petrine buildings and contemporary neoclassical landmarks. Within the 1830s official and public understanding of "antiquities" was narrowed to Russia's "indigenous" art of pre-petrine periods; baroque and neoclassicism of the 18th century, regarded as recent foreign influence, were exempt. Recognition of these styles as national heritage did not occur until the Russian neoclassical revival of the early 1900s.

The first regional register (album) of listed buildings was published in 1830 in Novgorod (including relics of Belozersk). In 1839 Andrey Glagolev published "Russian Fortresses", in 1844–1846 Ivan Pushkarev published four volumes on Northern Russian heritage. Professional studies of ancient architecture did not gain momentum until the 1840s, when the country accumulated a critical mass of architects trained in restoration projects in Italy and France at the expense of the Imperial Academy of Arts. Materials on Kievan Rus relics collected in the 1820s–1834, compiled by Konstantin Thon, contributed to the formulation of the official Russo-Byzantine style of the 1830s–1850s. Eventually the compilation duties were delegated to the Russian Archaeological Society, established in 1846–1849.

The building code of 1857 separated responsibility for preservation of historical buildings (17th century and earlier) depending on property type. State properties were now governed by the Ministry of Internal Affairs, with restoration financed by local taxes. Restoration of urban churches had to be approved by the Holy Synod, restoration of rural churches by local bishop, with prior consent of a civilian city architect. Private properties remained largely unregulated. An Imperial Archeological Commission, established in 1859, was tasked with maintenance of the register; however, it was never adequately financed.

=== Societies and Commissions (1861–1917) ===
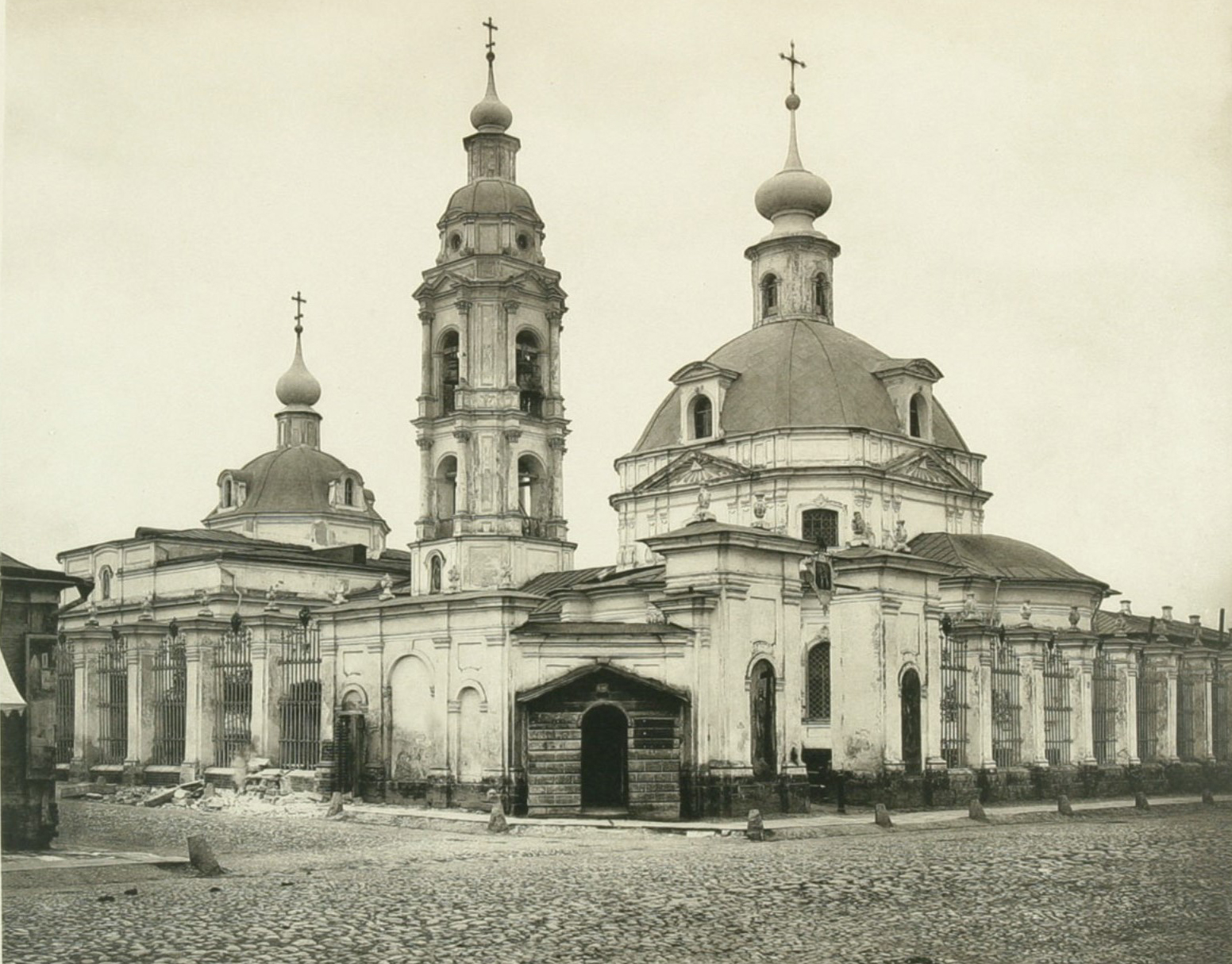
Baroque heritage was not deemed notable until the very end of the 19th century. This photo of St. Catherine church (Karl Blank, 1760s) was included in Nikolay Naidenov's catalogue in 1883, before official recognition of baroque art.

During the reign of Alexander II (1856–1881) the dominant policy shifted from preservation of buildings to recreation of their perceived, frequently fictional, "original" looks. The change was influenced by Western European experience, particularly works by Jonathan Smith and Viollet-le-Duc, as well as domestic political unrest. After the 1863 uprising in Poland Alexander launched a campaign of reintroducing Orthodoxy into Western provinces, including restoration of ruined Orthodox churches. To help formulate the new canon, Grigory Gagarin (vice-president of the Archaeological Society) instituted a special commission for "the studies of Russian and Orthodox in general, monuments of the Western Territory". In less than ten years the commission catalogued the Orthodox heritage of western Ukraine, Lithuania and Congress Poland, paying special attention to churches initially built as Orthodox and later converted to Catholicism; these were repossessed and eventually rebuilt to Orthodox canon.

In the second half of the 1860s Gagarin and count Alexey Uvarov solved the problem of managing the national register; in particular, Uvarov is credited with establishment of the non-governmental Moscow Archaeological Society (1869), a professional institution that literally "kept the nation's records" and was the public watchdog for preservation until the October Revolution. It tried to secure an exclusive right to approve or veto any changes to listed buildings, but failed; in 1874 these rights were granted to an Imperial Commission composed of members of Archaeological Societies, the Holy Synod, Russian Academy of Sciences and the Academy of Arts. In the same year the state finally formulated the legal meaning of architectural landmark and ensured equal protection for church and civil properties.

The register compiled by Archaeological Societies was augmented by regional catalogues published by amateurs such as Nikolay Naidenov, author of the four-volume "Moscow Cathedrals, Monasteries and Churches" (1883–1888). Amateurs were not bound by the official borderline between "antiquities" and modernity and thus preserved all-inclusive snapshots of their period. In the 1890s protection was gradually extended to selected buildings of the 18th century, however, their classification as heritage remained debatable until the 1900s. Late 18th and 19th century Empire style buildings were placed on the register shortly before World War I through the efforts of Ivan Mashkov, Ilya Bondarenko of Moscow Architectural Society and the Saint Petersburg school of Russian neoclassical revival.

=== Denial of heritage (1917–1941) ===
In the years immediately after the October Revolution, the Bolshevik administration had not yet forged its policy on culture; it was outwardly hostile to religion and "upper" classes, at the same time allowing preservationists to have a say in daily life of Soviet cities. The same person, Vladimir Lenin, decreed destruction of tsarist monuments and removal of church properties and at the same time authorized maintenance of cultural heritage registers. In the early 1920s the government supported conversion of significant historical buildings into public museums. Notable preservationists like Petr Baranovsky, Ilya Bondarenko and Petr Sytin took over nationalized landmarks for museums of local "people's heritage" and managed to delay their destruction and keep the record of surviving local heritage.

However, in the second half of the 1920s, the policy reversed to outward denial of this heritage and shutting down "redundant" local museums. With the change in values imposed by communist ideology, the tradition of preservation was broken. Independent preservation societies, even those that defended only secular landmarks such as Moscow-based OIRU were disbanded by the end of the 1920s. A new anti-religious campaign, launched in 1929, coincided with collectivization of peasants; destruction of churches in the cities peaked around 1932.

The rise of Stalinist architecture had dual consequences. On one hand, gigantic reconstruction plans demanded demolition of anything caught in the way. In Moscow, the new plans resulted in reducing the heritage register from 474 items in 1925 to just 74 in 1935; national RSFSR register shrunk from over 3,000 to 1,200. The establishment of the Academy of Architecture marginally improved attitudes towards the national heritage; the academy provided a new forum for preservationists. In 1940 the academy compiled its own list of top-priority landmarks and assessed the damages, but comprehensive national or even regional heritage registers did not reappear until after World War II. The few landmarks set aside by the planners of the 1930s remained protected and restored until the German invasion.

=== Post-war recovery (1945–1959) ===
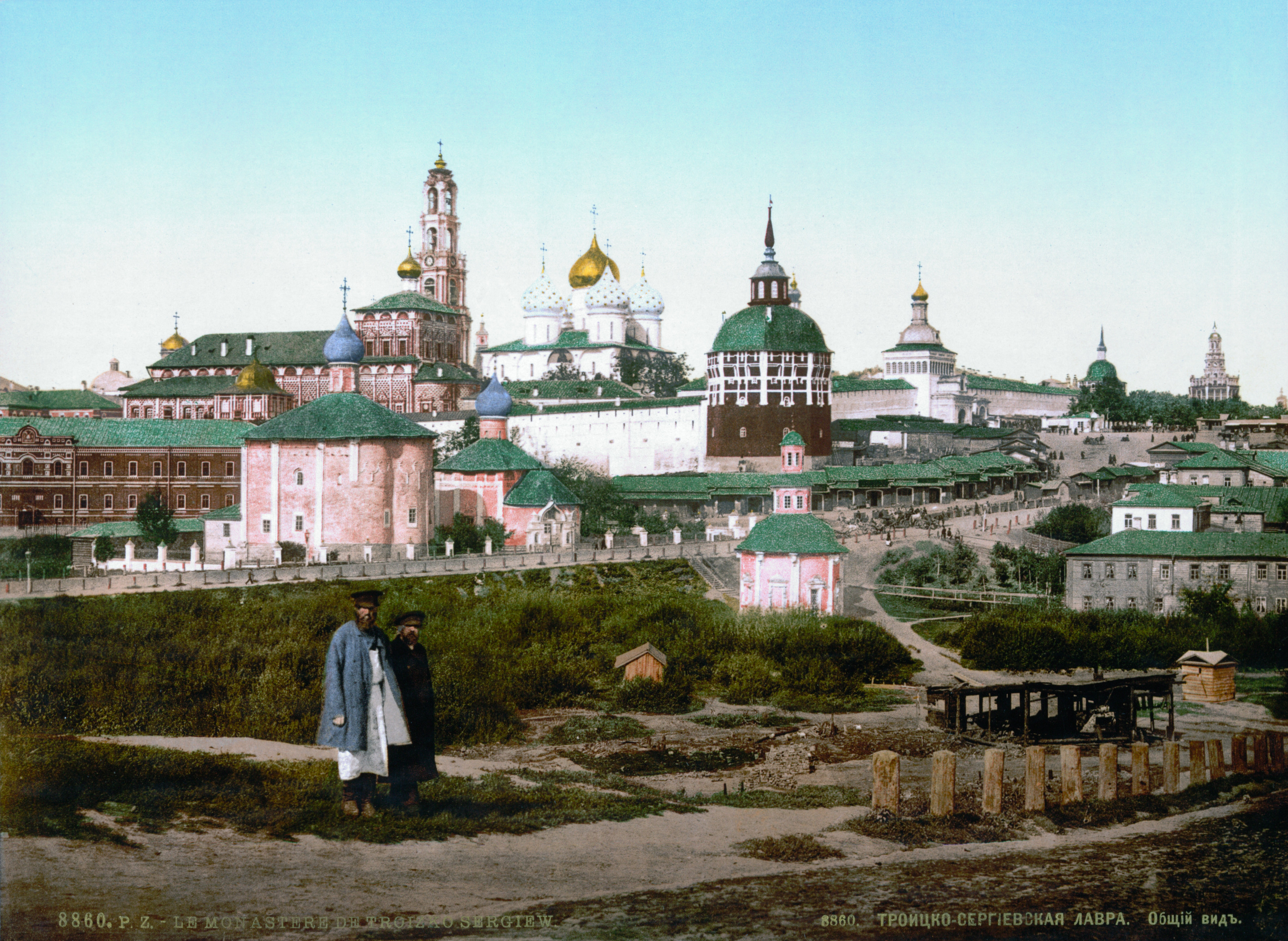
Troitse-Sergiyeva Lavra was listed by Joseph Stalin and delisted by Nikita Khrushchev.

Losses of World War II, conservatively estimated at 3,000 landmarks, and a wartime shift in favor of nationalist ideology raised the politicians' attention to the problems of surviving national heritage. In 1947 Council of Ministers of the RSFSR approved the new comprehensive list of more than 600 top priority buildings and ensembles. Detailed legal instruction on recordkeeping and protection followed in 1948.

The 1947 decree limited the scope of protected buildings to "ancient Russian" art, although the register included singular objects of Muslim culture (Khan's Mosque of the Bakhchisaray Palace and the fortress of Derbent) and many 19th-century buildings. More than half of listed buildings were located in the historical northern lands of the former Novgorod Republic and Vladimir Rus, with a substantial share of vernacular wooden architecture. Novgorod and Pskov, largely destroyed during the war, were restored.

Registers for the other republics of the Union and the cities of Leningrad and Moscow were developed independently (Moscow, in particular, benefited from its 800-year anniversary celebrated in 1947). Religious buildings dominated the registers, a consequence of a "conciliatory" policy toward the Russian Orthodox Church that was practiced in the last decade of Joseph Stalin's tenure.

=== Khrushchev's offensive (1959–1964) ===
Between 1951 and 1955, 37 buildings (mostly churches) were struck off the list. In 1960 the government approved a larger, purportedly all-inclusive register of more than 30 thousand buildings. However, shortly before the list was finalized, Nikita Khrushchev launched his anti-religious campaign of 1959–1964. By 1964 over 10 thousand churches out of 20 thousand were shut down (mostly in rural areas) and many were demolished. Of 58 monasteries and convents operating in 1959, only sixteen remained by 1964; of Moscow's fifty churches operating in 1959, thirty were closed and six demolished. The 1960 register also suffered reductions, notably in 1963 when authorities struck Troitse-Sergiyeva Lavra and other landmarks. Destruction reached into Moscow Kremlin when the Palace of Congresses replaced the "old" buildings of the Kremlin Armoury. In an unrelated move, in 1956, Khrushchev shut down the Academy of Architecture, an established venue for restorers and historians of architecture.

Khrushchev's campaign backfired, triggering a rise in public attention to national heritage and to the dismal state of the ecosystem. In March, 1962 a group of intellectuals published a bitter article on the destruction of old Moscow in Moskva monthly; official Pravda responded with harsh criticism in May. A public call to establish an independent watchdog society was just as harshly rejected. Two years later and six months before Khrushchev's fall from power, the first truly independent preservation society, Rodina, was founded in Moscow by Petr Baranovsky; barely tolerated by authorities, Rodina survived into the early 1970s.

=== Formal protection (1965–1991) ===
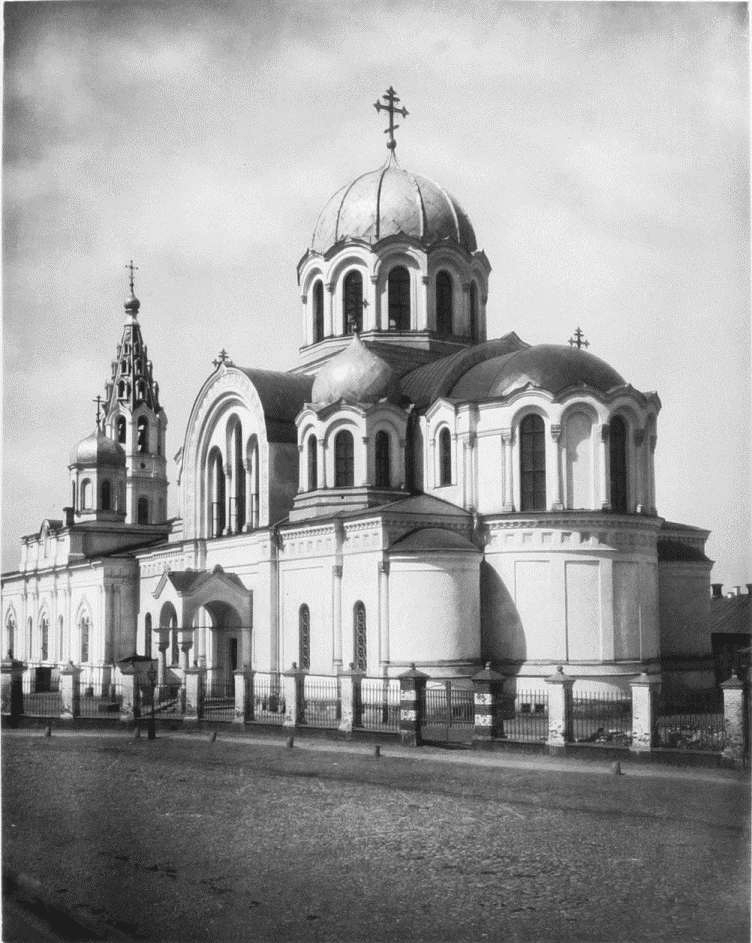
The Church of Kazan Icon in Yakimanka District of Moscow, desecrated in the 1930s and gradually reduced into a storage barn, was demolished during a 1972 campaign to clean up the city for Richard Nixon's state visit.

In 1965, Pavel Korin, Sergey Konenkov and Leonid Leonov published a call to stop destroying churches and, literally, "preserve our sacred places". Two months later, in an apparent reversal of Khrushchev's past, the state announced creation of VOOPIK – a national preservation society controlled by the state. However, preparation for its founding congress demonstrated that the state actually intended to create a powerless front group. It subordinated VOOPIK to Party bureaucrats and denied it the right to publish a journal. Disillusioned advocates (Vladimir Soloukhin, Ilya Glazunov) moved to a public forum of Molodaya Gvardiya magazine, shaping a new, nationalist, version of Russian history that sharply contradicted official doctrine.

Nevertheless, VOOPIK provided a forum to preservationists; discussions inside VOOPIK eventually led to legitimising previously suppressed nationalist issues; the dues paid by 15 million "mandatory volunteers" financed restoration projects. The society contributed to the heritage register but was never entrusted to manage it. In 1974 the government of the RSFSR produced a broader and stable version of the national register, reversing the 1960s reductions. In 1978 new practices for heritage monitoring were formulated in new national and republican laws "On protection and usage of monuments of history and culture".

In reality, landmarks were informally split into two groups. The most conspicuous ones, the tourist showcases, were largely untouchable and barely maintained; the rest were left to rot without proper maintenance. Sometimes these dilapidated buildings fell prey to one-off "cleanup" campaigns like those that preceded the 1972 state visit by Richard Nixon or the 1980 Summer Olympics, sometimes to urban renewal programs inherited from Stalin's master plans. Between 1965 and 1984, Moscow's preservation budget increased from 2 to 25 million roubles, or still less than 0.5% of the city's capital construction budget. Meager financing forced the authorities to freeze the heritage register as of its 1974 version. In Moscow about 1,200 buildings made the list, while about 1,100 new applications were rejected. 2,200 Moscow landmarks (mostly unlisted) disappeared during Leonid Brezhnev’s tenure (although only three of them were Orthodox churches).

In June 1978 Party executive Mikhail Solomentsev attempted to appease public opposition, declaring heritage preservation a high priority for the Party and voiced full support for VOOPIK. The message did not appease residents who passed everyday examples of neglect and ruin; Soloukhin wrote: "My book could have contained not four essays but twenty four. I suspect, however, that the effect would have been the same". The policy of empty declarations continued in 1982, when Dmitry Likhachev reported in Ogonyok that the RSFSR heritage register must be expanded three-fold, to at least 180 thousand items. The Ministry of Culture immediately concurred with the new estimate and ordered restoration of the buildings pinpointed by Likhachev, yet no work was done. The USSR's final years brought no improvement; in 1986 even hard-line communist Yegor Ligachev had to admit in public that "destruction of central Moscow has become a political issue" and praised preservationists' efforts.

The brief period of perestroika that preceded the fall of the Union did not change the situation radically, apart from allowing the Church to gradually repossess its former properties. Takeover incited conflicts, especially where churches had been occupied by public institutions (as was the case of Yaroslavl Museum of Art, subject of a bitter public campaign of 1990–1993). The first modernist buildings were listed in 1987; by 1990 protection was granted to all Moscow buildings designed by Konstantin Melnikov.

=== Post-Soviet Russia (1991–present) ===
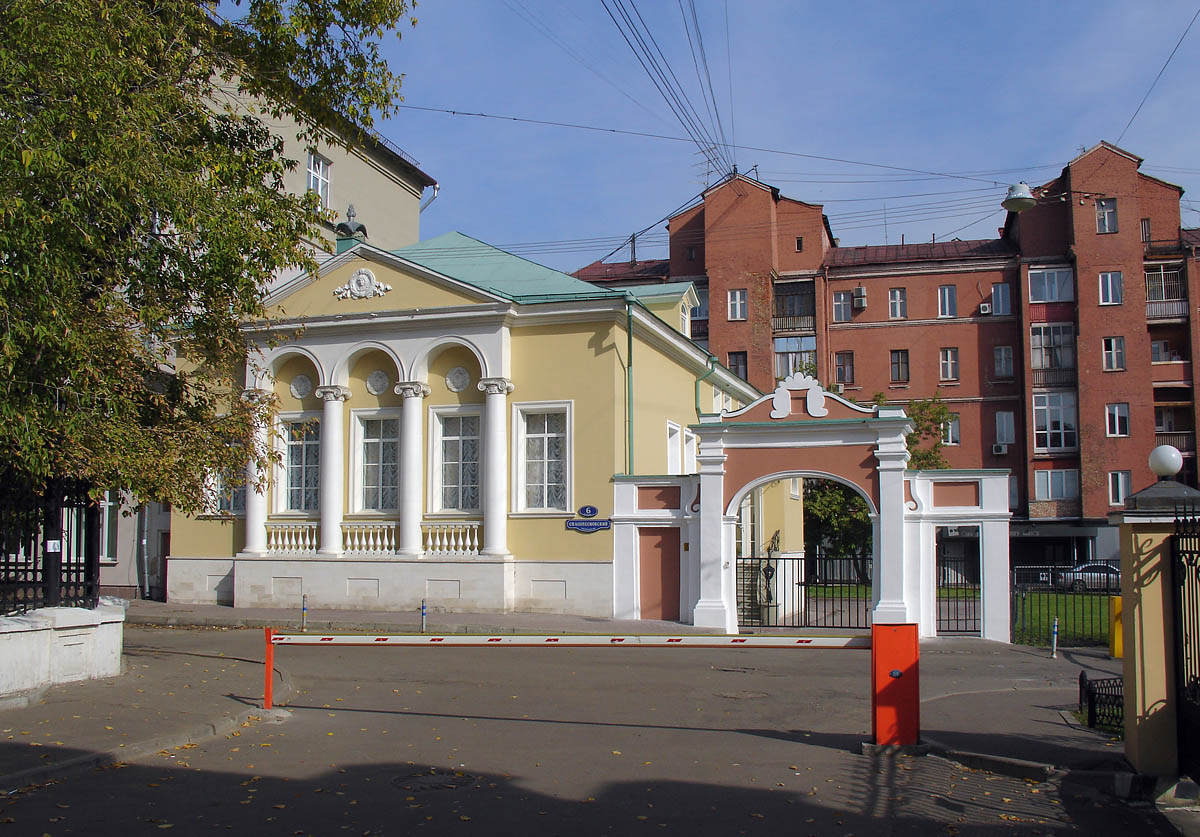
Moscow City Heritage register still lists this house near Arbat Street as an 18th-century wooden building although it was taken apart and rebuilt in 1994, retaining less than 15% of original structure. The federal heritage register admitted the fact and delisted the property.

In 1995, Boris Yeltsin approved a new, expanded federal heritage register. The new version suffered from inconsistencies influenced by regional politics: for example, numerous residential buildings in Kirov Oblast were granted federal protection, while similar buildings elsewhere were considered local, or at best regional, points of interest. It inherited most of the errors present in the 1974 register.

Public affection for surviving heritage remained strong: "Any American preservationist would be jealous of the importance assigned to historic preservation by contemporary residents of Yaroslavl", but failed to check the construction boom that destroyed thousands of historical buildings. Moscow losses of 1900–2006 are estimated at over 640 notable buildings (including 150 to 200 listed buildings, out of a total inventory of 3,500) – some disappeared completely, others were replaced with concrete replicas while still listed. Only a few cases of destruction (not backed by local authorities) reached the courts; wherever possible, interested developers succeeded in delisting target buildings prior to demolition. As "ethical reference points were swept aside by a torrent of money", former Minister of Culture Alexander Sokolov described the situation as "bacchanalia of uncoordinated construction".

The city of Moscow reduced its restoration budget from 150 million pound sterling in 1989 to barely 8 million in 2004 and at the same time elevated replacement of old buildings with modern replicas to a policy level. In May 2004 mayor Yury Luzhkov defended the policy in Izvestia, saying that "In Moscow culture, the notion of a replica sometimes has no lesser meaning than the original had. Meaningful historical and cultural 'load' carried by the replica is frequently richer and wider than the original architect's solution." (Note: Russian: В московской культуре понятие копии иногда имеет не меньший смысл, чем оригинала. Потому что смысловая, историческая и культурная «нагрузка», которую несет в себе такая «копия», часто может быть и богаче, и глубже первоначального архитектурного решения.) Rebuilding is cheaper than restoration and increases rentable space. The same attitude of decision-makers developed in other towns and was studied in Yaroslavl by Blair Ruble, who identified growing social separation between advocates of preservation and decision-makers: the latter are "among the least identified with the need to preserve", not in the least because the affluent ruling class chooses suburban lifestyle, out of touch with the city.

== Legislation ==
Geographical distribution of listed properties
Federal district	Share in total inventory	Rating of properties	
Federal district	Share in total inventory	Federal	Regional and municipal
North-Western	43%	39%	61%
Central	37%	17%	83%
Volga	8%	10%	90%
Southern	7%	4%	96%
Urals	2%	7%	93%
Siberian	2%	8%	92%
Far Eastern	1%	no data	no data
Total	100%	–	–

Federal law "On the objects of cultural heritage (monuments of culture and history)", enacted in June 2002, defines these objects as either standalone buildings or monuments with adjacent territories, or ensembles of buildings, or "notable places" (cultural landscapes, including historical urban districts and major archaeological sites). A registered object (or a historical event that is key to an object's notability) must be at least forty years old; the memorial home of a notable person may be registered immediately upon that person's death.

Depending on their significance, objects of cultural heritage are assigned to either federal, regional or local (municipal) level (archaeological sites are automatically assigned to federal level). Top priority federal objects (including all World Heritage Sites) form a special subset of "most valuable" objects. They are listed in a separate State Code of Particularly Valuable Objects of Cultural Heritage of the Peoples of the Russian Federation which, in addition to immovable properties, includes active institutions (theaters, museums, universities, libraries and archives). "Particularly valuable" objects, by definition, are federal state properties, however, in December 2008 Pavlovsk and Gatchina palaces, part of a World Heritage Site, became municipal property of the city of Saint Petersburg. Privatization of lesser landmarks controlled by the federal government, put on hold in the early 1990s, was allowed in 2008. However, privatization auctions did not catch investors' interest and only about 250 objects changed hands in 2008. Regional listed properties were gradually privatized throughout the 1990s.

New properties are listed through a two-tier procedure. In case of regional and local properties, the regional branch of Rosokhrankultura collects all relevant information and issues a recommendation to the regional government; then, actual listing is promulgated by a decree of regional government. Professional preservationist organizations usually have significant influence at the early stages of the process, but are barely mentioned in law. Regional legislators and municipal authorities are excluded from the process altogether. The federal register was intended to track and incorporate any changes in regional registers, but as of 2009 it had not happened.

Lower-level authorities have limited rights. For example, municipalities cannot register their own objects; instead, they must apply to Rosokhrankultura representatives. Federal authorities can reclassify any object of regional or municipal significance as a federal landmark.

Perhaps worse for the objects is that regional governments cannot legally finance restoration of federal-level buildings unless they are specifically mentioned in jointly-financed federal target programs. The law allows financing "preservation" which, in Russian legalese, excludes capital investment in restoration. Until January 1, 2008, even this "preservation" was not allowed; at best, regions were allowed to set up independent charities and seek donations. This is particularly important for the city of Saint Petersburg and its suburbs, where an overwhelming majority of notable buildings are rated at federal level. Municipal authorities are still not allowed to finance restoration of regional and federal properties, but under the present Tax Code they have no funds for projects.

== Unsolved problems ==
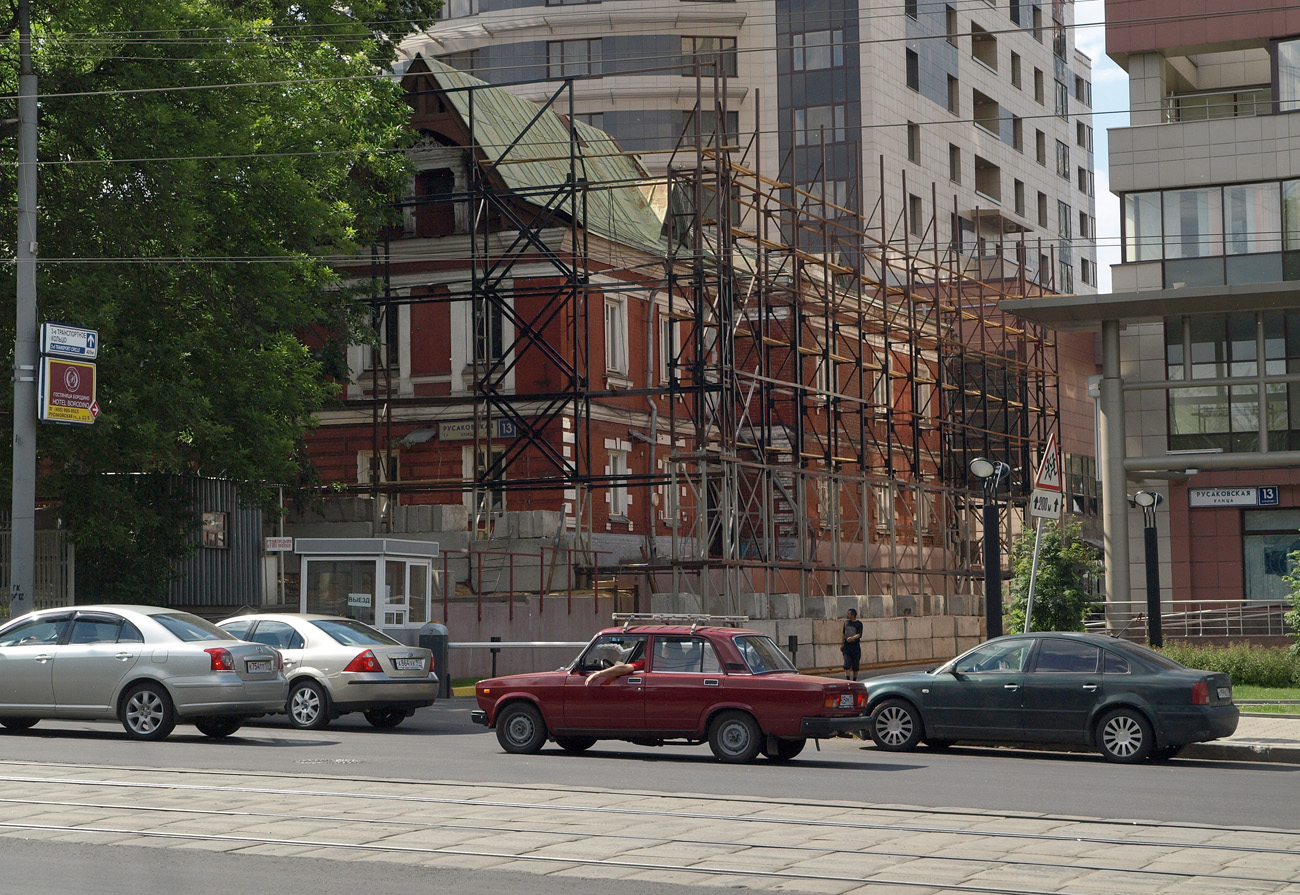
This 1890s building, listed in 2001, was demolished in September 2008. Property developer walked away with a $1,500 fine.

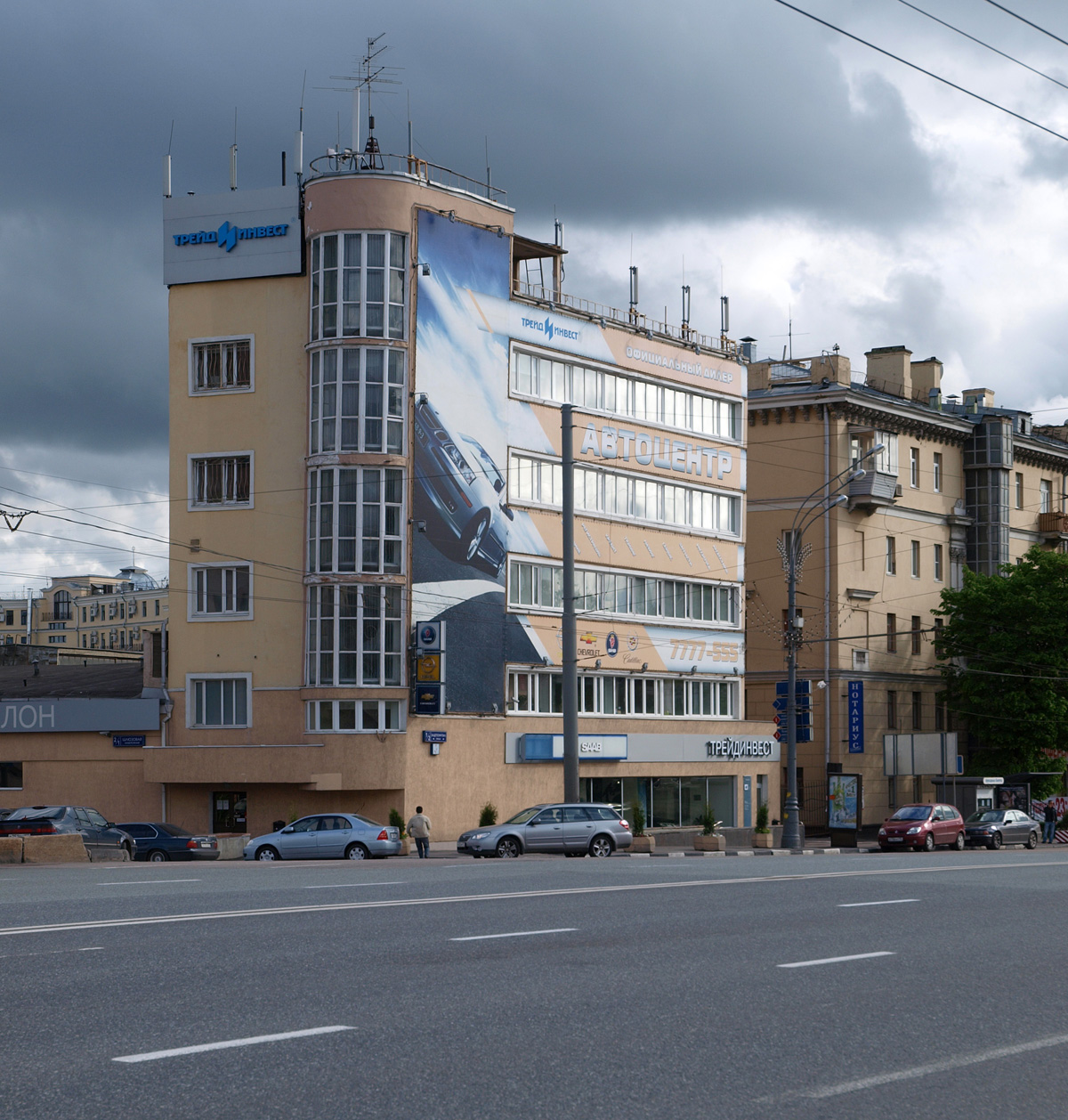
Listing of surviving constructivist architecture is contested by authorities and has narrow public support base.

=== Definitions ===
Russia has no legal or otherwise generally accepted definition of cultural landscape. Local zoning regulations, once imposed by municipal authorities, can be lifted in favor of "important" projects.

=== Saint Petersburg ===
In Saint Petersburg, the city heritage commissioner attempted to enforce demolition of an addition to a building on Moika Embankment that wrecked the skyline of this protected neighborhood. However, the building itself was not listed and no sanctions were imposed; the city architect and other involved executives upheld the developer's interests. The city governor approved construction of Gazprom's 400-meter Okhta Center while the outline of Palace Square was deformed by a highrise built behind the former General Staff building; the latter incursion against a World Heritage Site was supported by the city architect. In Moscow, the southward view from Red Square was similarly deformed in 2005 by a 162 meter tall Swissotel tower.

=== No independent watchdog ===
No Russian independent preservation group has sufficient influence to intervene into the plans of city authorities and property developers. Legislation leaves matters of preservation to federal and municipal heritage commissions, neither of which are sufficiently independent to check these plans. As a result, listed buildings are easily delisted, or their listing is delayed until the wrecking crews (Voyentorg building) or fire (El Lissitzky's Ogonyok printshop) reduce them to ruins.

=== Property title ===
A significant share of state-owned landmarks have no legal owner due to disputes between federal and regional authorities and the legal ban on registering title for such properties (lifted in 2008). Saint Petersburg alone, as of April 2008, had 1,200 listed objects without registered titles. Only in 2008 did the authorities agree to register 393 buildings (including Hermitage Museum and Smolny Palace) as federal property and 243 as city property; ownership of Peter and Paul Fortress was split. The last batch of 90 buildings (the most potentially profitable, rentable properties) was split in May 2009. As a result, after 680 objects were assigned to the city and 424 to federal authorities, at the end of May 2009 Saint Petersburg had only 13 listed buildings, all former churches, including Saint Isaac's Cathedral and Church of the Savior on Blood. in legal limbo. The city has over 3,000 "newly found" historical buildings on the waiting list of local heritage commission; they will be either listed or demolished.

Moscow, as of July 2009, has around 2,500 historical buildings waiting for inclusion into the heritage register, including five buildings by Fyodor Schechtel and St. Andrew's Anglican Church. Around 500 buildings on this list are expected to be denied protection of any kind.

=== Recognition of modernist architecture ===
Addition of yet unlisted avantgarde buildings to the register remains controversial. Western authors noted that preservation of these buildings has a very narrow support base, limited to architects' heirs and selected intelligentsia; the general public identifies the bulk of avant-garde architecture with the bland Soviet industrial past, and as devoid of Russian national character. According to Anna Bronovitskaya, "Modernist aesthetics have never recovered from Stalin's denouncement... the public remains very conservative in its tastes." Russian restorers have no experience in handling concrete structures, making restoration itself a threat to their survival, unless the investor hires German restorers. Prejudice against real or perceived poor construction quality of the interwar period favors radical rebuilding initiatives. As a result, far more avant-garde buildings perished in modern Russia than in socialist Soviet Union; the art of the 20th century "have proved to be the most vulnerable and poorly defended".

Moscow Heritage Commission is split on the heritage value of mainstream constructivist and rationalist architecture. Moscow Mayor Yury Luzhkov denounced the "flat-faced architecture"; the city's chief architect has spoken against preservation of functional midrise housing built in the 1920s and 1930s, saying, "they are doomed"; some of these blocks have been condemned for demolition. Nevertheless, in 2008 Moscow listed 114 "newly identified" buildings of this period.

== Bibliography ==
- Brudny, Yitzhak M. (2000). Reinventing Russia: Russian Nationalism and the Soviet State, 1953–1991. Harvard University Press. ISBN 978-0-674-00438-2.
- Cracraft, James (1988). The Petrine revolution in Russian architecture. University of Chicago Press. ISBN 978-0-226-11664-8.
- Cohen, Jean-Louis (2008a). "Preserving Modernism: A Russian Exception?" (PDF). Future Anterior. 5 (1): x–xvi. doi:10.1353/fta.0.0006. ISSN 1934-6026. S2CID 191498475.
- Cohen, Jean-Louis (2008b). "Soviet Legal Documents on the Preservation of Monuments" (PDF). Future Anterior. 5 (1): 62–63. doi:10.1353/fta.0.0005. ISSN 1934-6026. S2CID 191622581.
- "Compendium of Cultural Policies and Trends in Europe, 10th edition". Council of Europe / ERICarts. 2009. Archived from the original on 2016-02-08.
- Cracraft, James; Rowland, Daniel Bruce (2003). Architectures of Russian Identity: 1500 to the Present. Cornell University Press. ISBN 978-0-8014-8828-3.
- Dushkina, Natalya (2008). "Heritage at Risk: The Fate of Modernist Buildings in Russia" (PDF). Future Anterior. 5 (1): xx-14. doi:10.1353/fta.0.0008. ISSN 1934-6026. S2CID 144936048.
- Fyodorov, B. G.; et al. (2006). Hroniki unichtozhenia staroy Moskvy 1990–2006 Хроники уничтожения старой Москвы 1990–2006 (in Russian). Moscow: Muzey Arhitektury. ISBN 978-5-903228-01-0.
- Hosking, Geoffrey H. (2006). Rulers and victims: the Russians in the Soviet Union. Harvard University Press. ISBN 978-0-674-02178-5.
- Innovative policies for heritage safeguarding and cultural tourism development: proceedings of the international conference (PDF). UNESCO; State University – Higher School of Economics. 2005. ISBN 5-7598-0384-0.
- "Problemy ucheta i vnesenia v Reestr" Проблемы учета и внесения в Реестр (in Russian). Ministry of Culture of the Russian Federation. 2009. Archived from the original on 2008-12-26.
- "Russian legislation on the cultural heritage, 1947 – 2002 (including actual historical registers of listed buildings)" (in Russian). Archived from the original on 2008-12-26.
- Shchenkov, A. S.; et al., eds. (2002). Pamyatniki arhitektury v dorevolutsionnoy Rossii Памятники архитектуры в дореволюционной России (in Russian). Moscow: Terra. ISBN 5-275-00664-0.
- Shcherbo, G. M. (1997). Sukhareva Bashnya Сухарева Башня (in Russian). Moscow: Janus-M. ISBN 5-8037-0001-0. Archived from the original on 2011-05-27.
- Schmidt, Albert J. (1990). The Impact of perestroika on Soviet law. Martinus Nijhoff Publishers. ISBN 978-0-7923-0621-4.
- Schmidt, Albert J. (1989). The architecture and planning of classical Moscow: a cultural history. DIANE Publishing. ISBN 978-0-87169-181-1.
- Zalivako, Anke (2008). "A Critique of the Preservation of Moscow's Planetarium" (PDF). Future Anterior. 5 (1): 38–50. doi:10.1353/fta.0.0001. ISSN 1934-6026. S2CID 191485374.
