= Gench-Ogluev House =

Building in Rostov-on-Don, Russia

Coordinates: 47°13′16.2″N 39°42′48.5″E

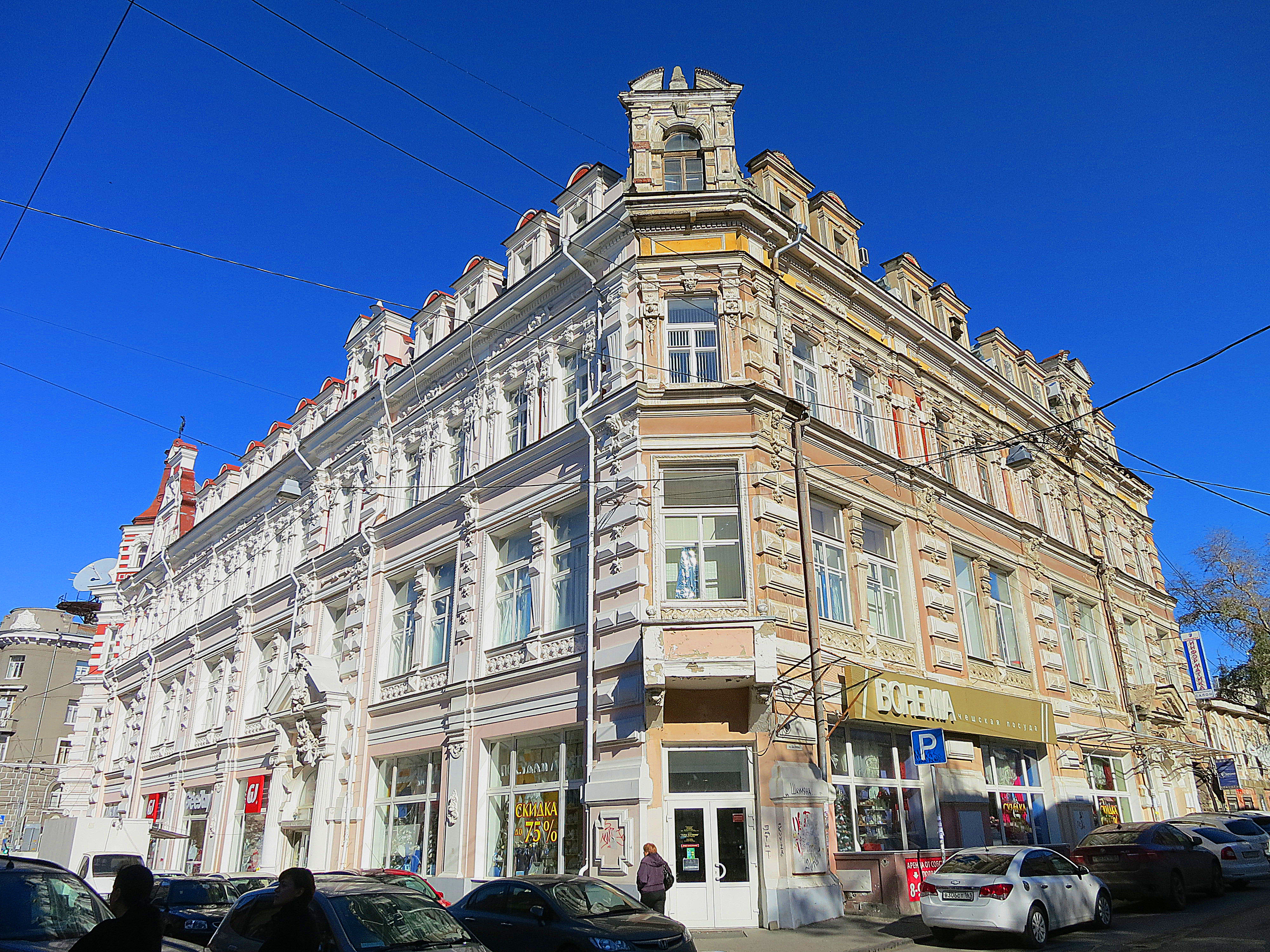
Gench-Ogluev House

The Gench-Ogluev House (Russian: Дом Генч-Оглуева, romanized: Dom Gench-Oglueva) is a historic house in the Leninsky District of Rostov-on-Don, Russia. The house is located at 68 Bolshaya Sadovaya Street, at the intersection of Bolshaya Sadovaya Street and Semashko Lane, directly opposite the Rostov-on-Don City hall. The building has the status of an object of cultural heritage of federal significance.

== History ==
In the late 1870s the important Rostov merchant Stepan Gench-Ogluev decided to build a revenue house. Architect Alexander Pomerantsev drew up the designs, with construction beginning in 1880 and being completed by 1883. It was Pomerantsev's first work in Rostov-on-Don.

Gench-Ogluev rented out the house. On the ground floor were business premises, and above them were offices and apartments. A printing house of the newspaper Priazovsky Krai ("Azov frontier") was for a time located in the building, as was a branch of the Volga-Kama Commercial Bank from 1897 until the construction of its own building. The Gench-Ogluev House was nationalized in the 1920s after the establishment of Soviet rule. Records from 1925 show that the ground floor of the house was at this time occupied by a branch of the South-Western Commercial corporate bank, the Rostov district office of "Neftesindikat", and the "Myasokombinat" butcher shop, as well as other premises. Living quarters occupied the second, third and fourth floors. In the 1930s, the "Ryba" fish shop was opened in the building.

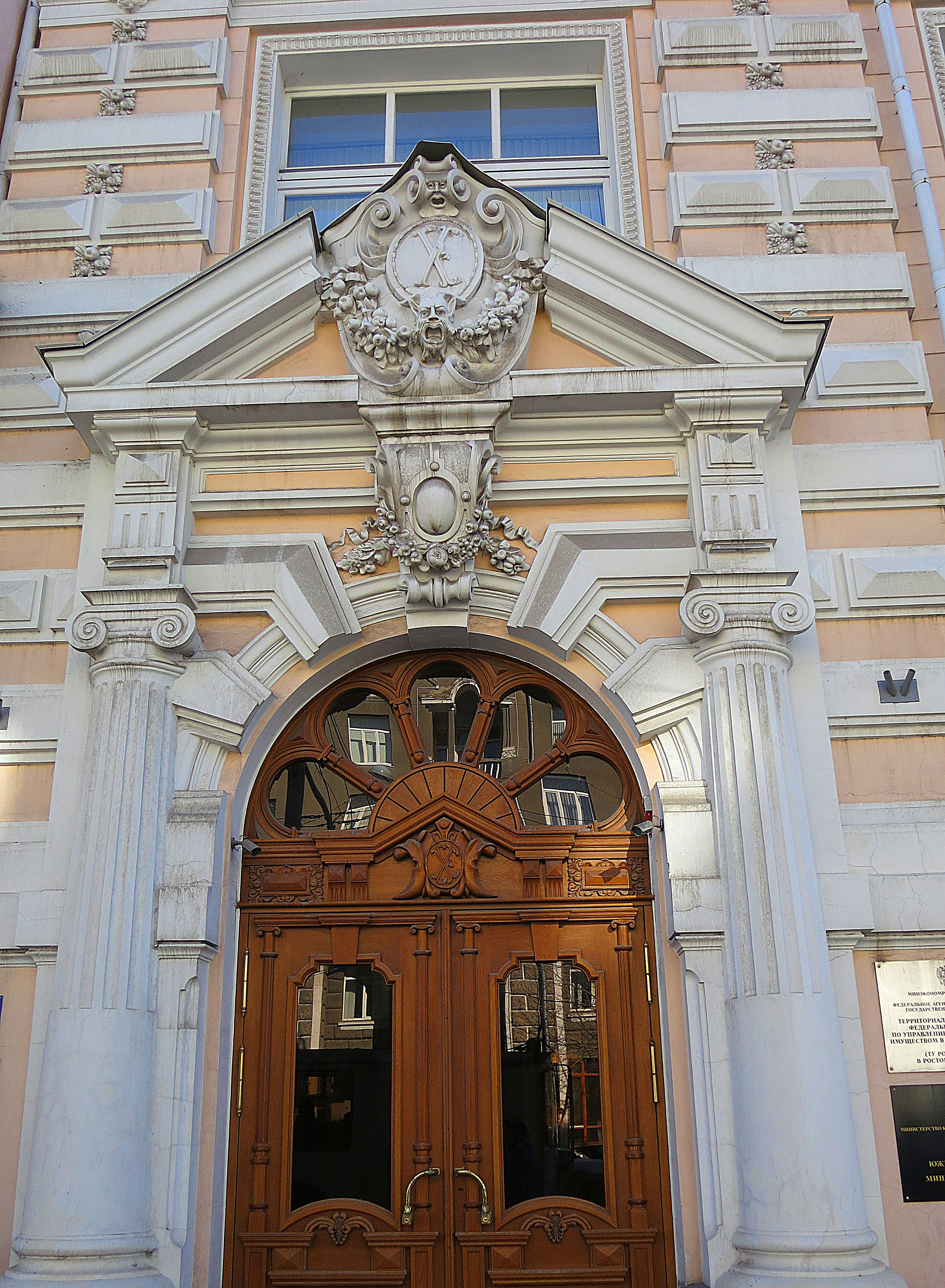
Doorway and decorative details of the Gench-Ogluev House

The building sustained damage during the Great Patriotic War, with the destruction of the roof. The house was restored between 1948 and 1949. The facade was refurbished with some changes. Several damaged balconies were not restored.

== Description ==
The building was designed in the Beaux-Arts style. The architecture employs Baroque elements, with classical cornices, combined with Gothic bas-reliefs on the pediments. The facade is decorated with quoins.
