= Alexander Pomerantsev =

Russian architect and educator

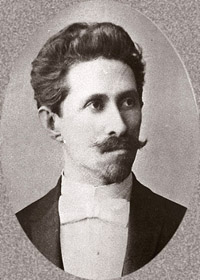
- Born: 11 November 1849; Moscow, Moscow Governorate, Russian Empire
- Died: 27 October 1918 (aged 68); Petrograd, Russian SFSR
- Education: Member Academy of Arts (1887); Professor by rank (1892); Full Member Academy of Arts (1893)
- Alma mater: Moscow School of Painting, Sculpture and Architecture; Imperial Academy of Arts (1877)
- Employer: Own practice
- Known for: Architecture
- Notable work: Alexander Nevsky Cathedral (Sofia), Alexander Nevsky Cathedral, Moscow, Bridges and stations of Moscow Ring Railroad
- Awards: Big Gold Medal of the Imperial Academy of Arts

Alexander Nikanorovich Pomerantsev (Russian: Александр Никанорович Померанцев; 11 November 1849 — 27 October 1918) was a Russian architect and educator responsible for some of the most ambitious architectural projects realized in Imperial Russia and Bulgaria at the turn of the 20th century. An accomplished eclecticist, Pomerantsev practiced Art Nouveau, Byzantine, Russian Revival styles and collaborated with leading structural engineers of his period in creating new types of commercial buildings.

== Training and early career ==
Pomerantsev was born in Moscow and graduated from the Moscow School of Painting, Sculpture and Architecture in 1874. He furthered his education at the Imperial Academy of Arts (1874–78), winning the Academy scholarship for a five-year study tour of Italy, France and Switzerland (1878–1883). In 1887 he was awarded title of Academic of Architecture for his study of Cappella Palatina (1887, revised edition 1911).

The first buildings by Pomerantsev were built in Rostov-on-Don; the block-sized Moskovskaya Hotel, Rostov City Hall, and the Gench-Ogluev House (1883) were at that time the largest structures in the city. These buildings followed the European eclectic tradition.

== Upper Trading Rows ==
In 1889 Pomerantsev won an open competition to design the Moscow Upper Trading Rows (now GUM) on Red Square, his first large, and perhaps his most conspicuous project. It was "a turning point in Russian architectural history, not only because it represented the apogee of the search for a national style but also because it demanded advanced functional technology applied on a scale unprecedented in Russian civil architecture." Pomerantsev provided overall planning and architectural design, Vladimir Shukhov – structural design. According to William Craft Brumfield, "that the enormous Upper Trading Rows functioned, if imperfectly, is a tribute both to Shukhov's design and to the technical proficiency of Russian architecture toward the end of the century. The use of reinforced concrete for the interior walls and vaulting eliminated the need for thick masonry support walls and provided the space for circulation and light. For maintenance, there was a network of basement corridors, beneath which was a subbasement with heating boilers and an electrical generating station. Every element of professional architecture, from educational institutions to the open competition system, contributed to the project." Critics noted disjunction of functional concrete and steel structure and elaborate Russian Revival styling that consumed 40 million bricks. While upper floor galleries benefited from Shukhov's skylights, lower level suffered from inadequate ventilation, and, as a result, demand for shop space in the building did not meet the expectations.

== 1896 Exhibition ==
In 1895 Pomerantsev was appointed chief architect of the 1896 All-Russian Exhibition in Nizhny Novgorod, an event heralded as the guiding light for the upcoming 20th century. Master plan and principal pavilions of the exhibition are credited personally to Pomerantsev. Most pavilions relied on novel steel frame load-bearing structures designed by Shukhov; they "represented the most advanced use of metal-frame construction for their time and possibly the first use of a metal membrane roof" (Shukhov Rotunda). Pomerantsev's Pavilion of Arts was based on traditional structure, but stylistically predated Charles Girault's Petit Palais (1900) and is considered the forerunner of emerging Russian Art Nouveau. When the Pavilion was eventually torn down, its framing and finishes were reused for the People's House theater in Saint Petersburg.

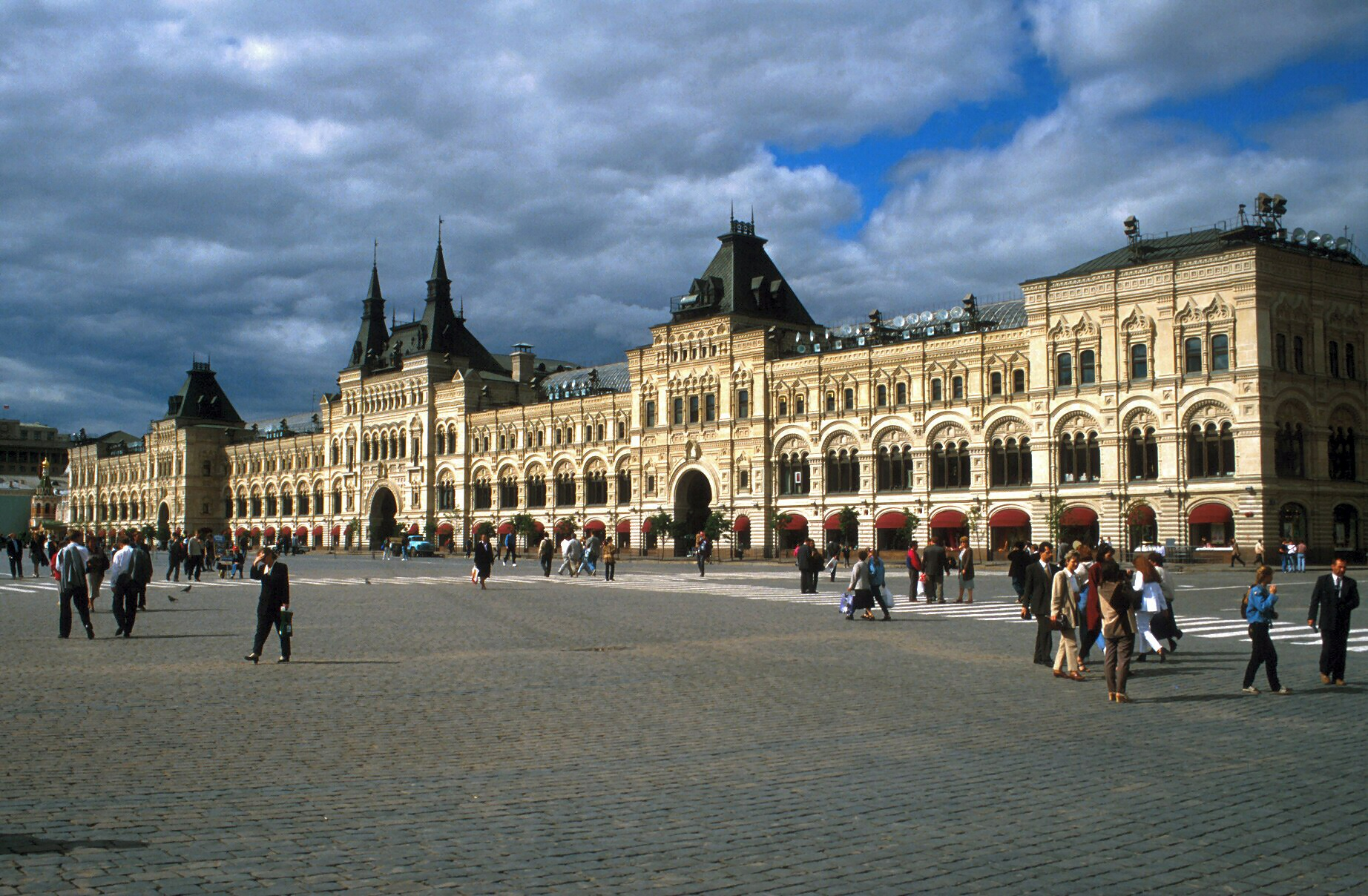
Upper Trading Rows

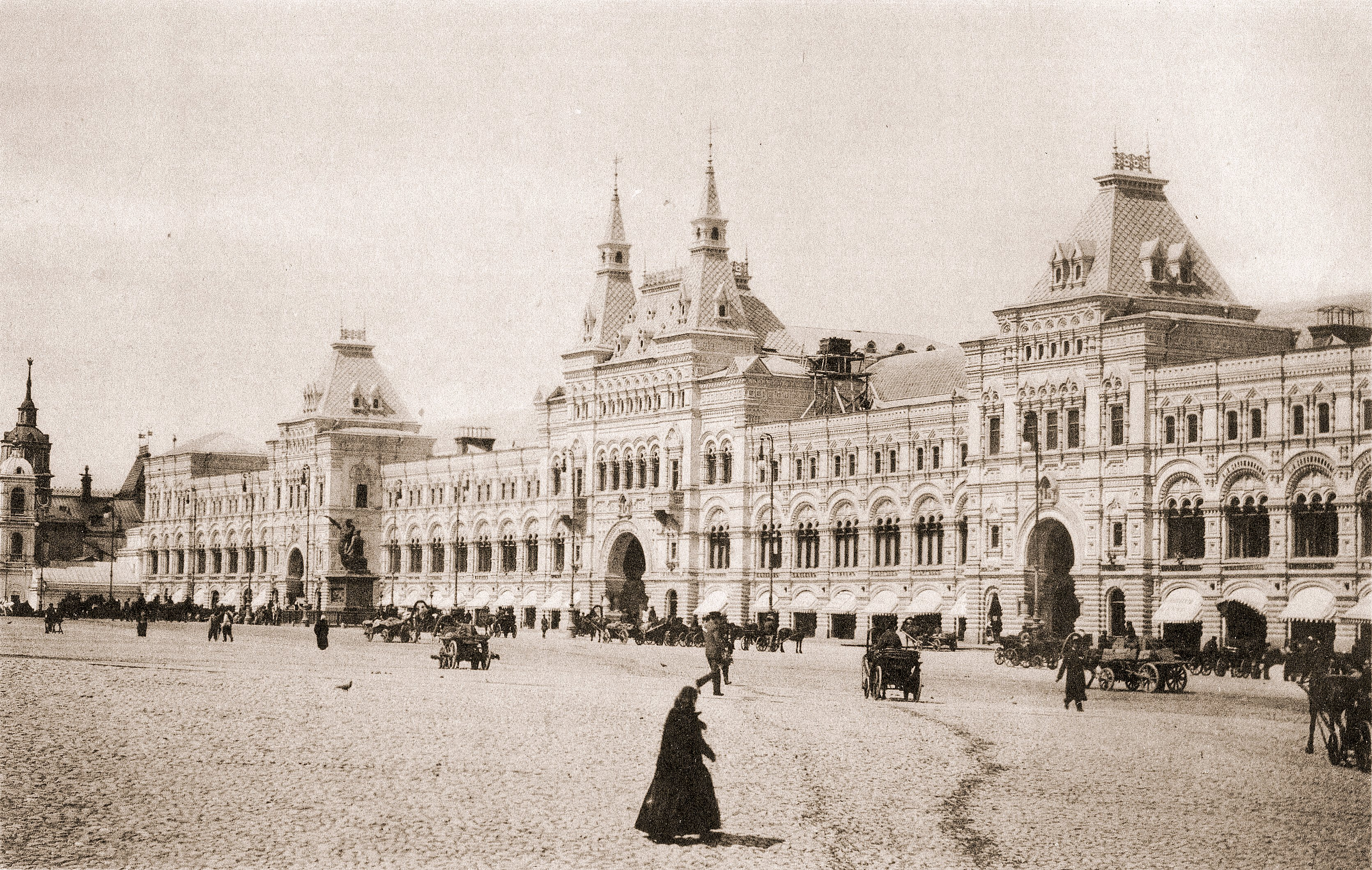
Upper Trading Rows (early 1900th)

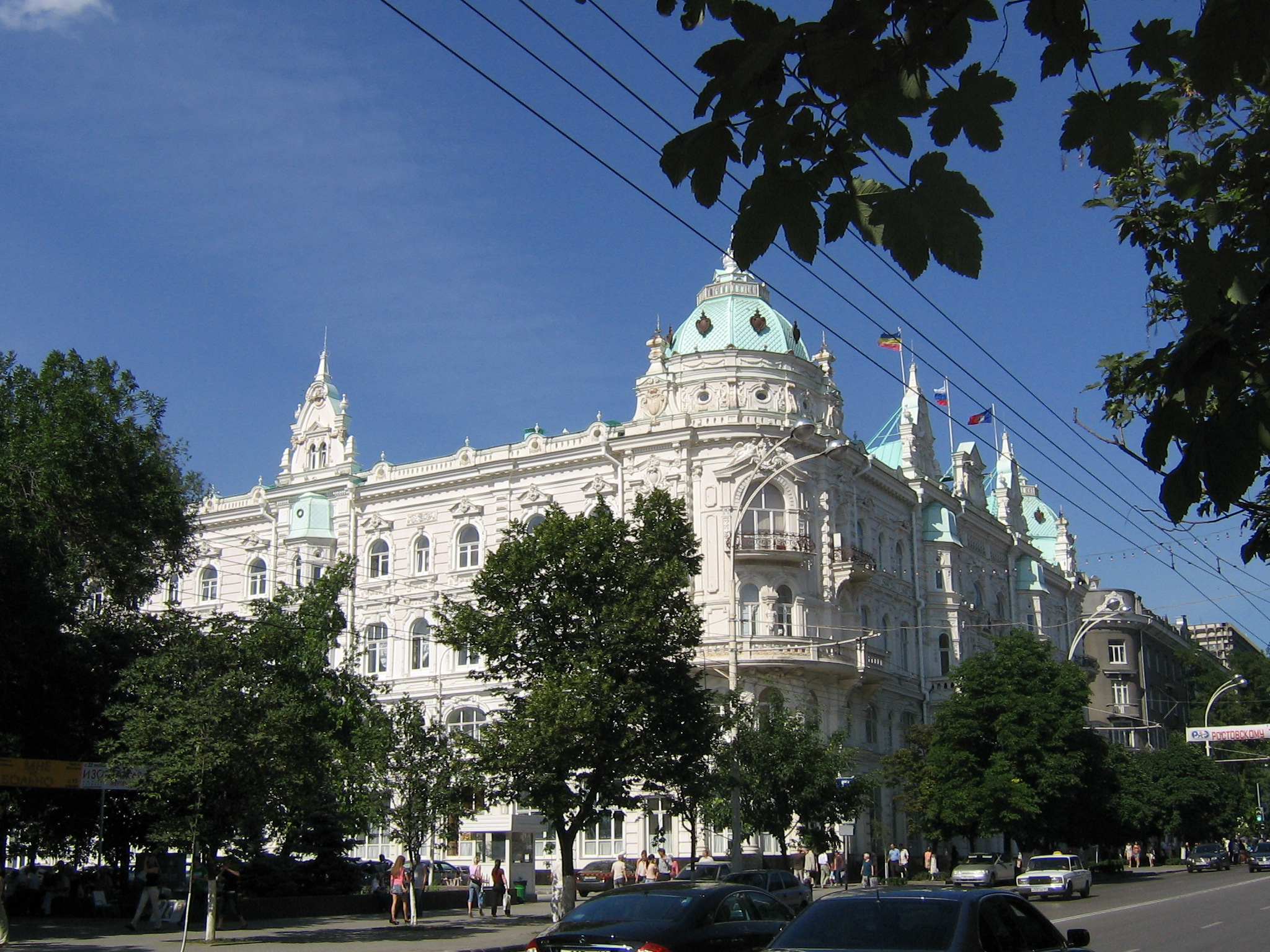
Rostov City Hall

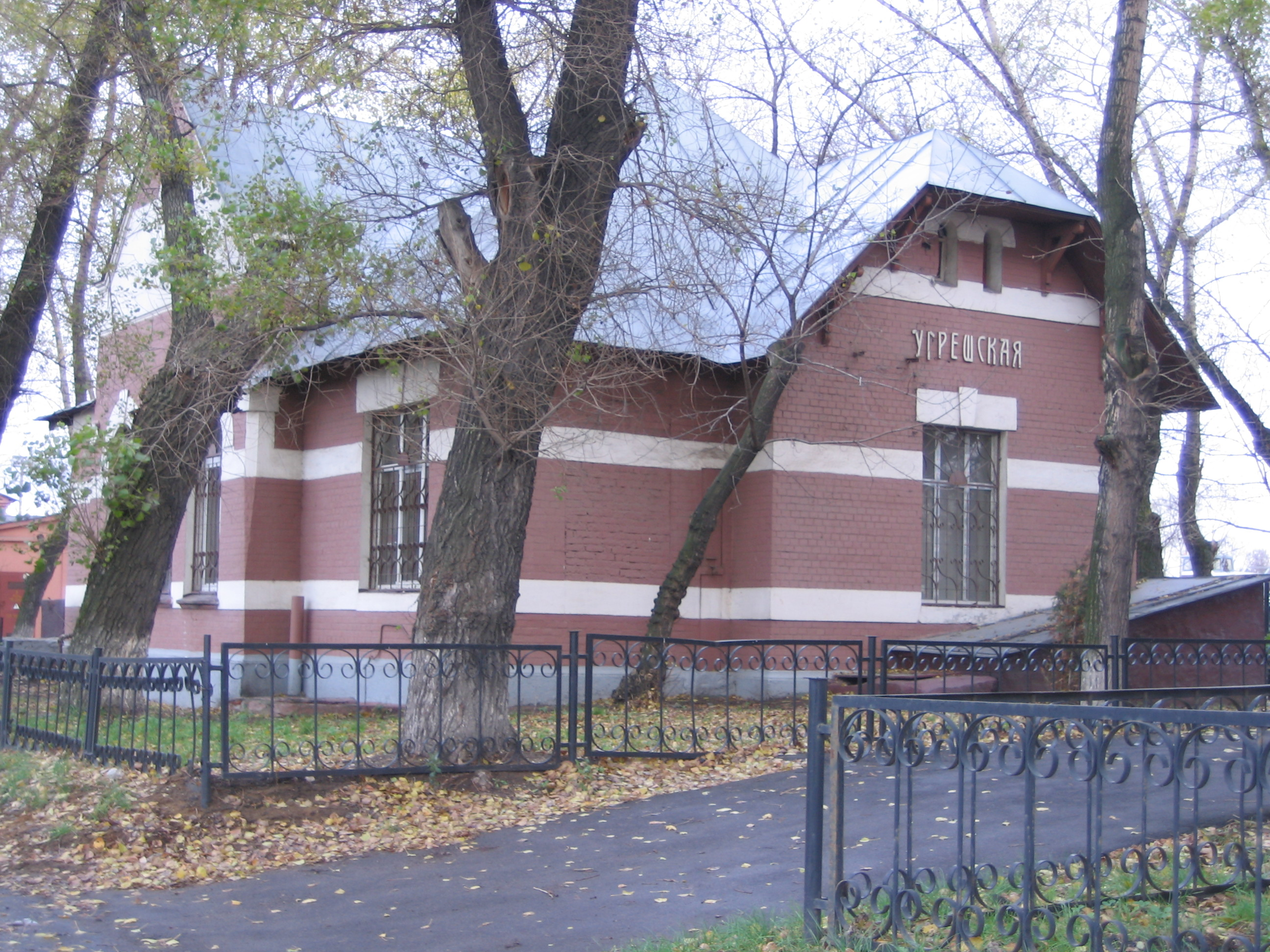
Ugreshskaya rail station, Moscow

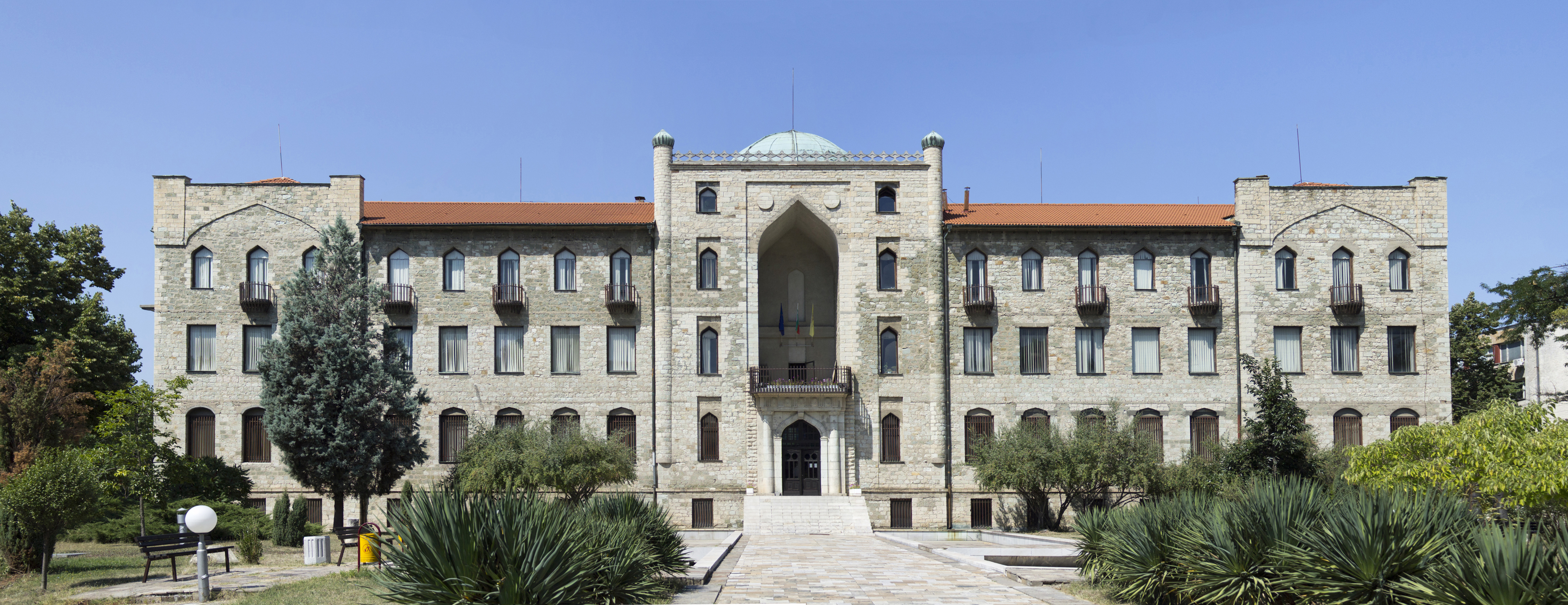
History Museum, Kardzhali

== Moscow Ring Railroad ==
Around 1900 Pomerantsev joined the team of engineers and architects (Peter Rashevsky, Lavr Proskuryakov, Nikolai Markovnikov) of the Moscow Smaller Ring Railroad, a 54 kilometer ring freight line around the city. Pomerantsev provided architectural design to 20 stations of the Ring, employee housing, warehouses, roundhouses and water towers, as well as to two of Proskuryakov's bridges (now demolished, see Andreyevsky Bridge and Krasnoluzhsky Bridge). Regular traffic on the Ring commenced in July 1908. Station designs by Pomerantsev mixed motifs of Vienna Secession, Victorian Gothic and traditional eclecticism leaning to neoclassicism yet were clearly styled as a cohesive ensemble. All were built in unfinished red brick with white decorative inserts in line with industrial architecture of the period.

== Cathedrals ==
Pomerantsev lost the 1893–1894 competition for the Alexander Nevsky Cathedral in Warsaw to Leon Benois; both architects filed Russian Revival proposals, however, Pomerantsev leaned to "red brick" churches of Alexander II period covered with ornamental cliches and crowned with Thon-styled dome; draft by Benois was a refined nod to Vladimir Rus architecture. In 1907-1911 Pomerantsev designed the new building for Moskovsky Rail Terminal, retaining Thon's original facade; the project did not materialize.

In 1898 Pomerantsev designed Alexander Nevsky Cathedral in Sofia. The Neo-Byzantine cathedral, rated for 5,000 worshippers, was built to commemorate the Russian soldiers perished during the 1877–1878 war. Work began in 1882, although most of the structure was actually built in 1904–1912.

Pomerantsev' last major work was also a church dedicated to Saint Alexander Nevsky (his own patron saint). It was the Alexander Nevsky Cathedral in the remote Miusskaya Square of Moscow. The large 17-dome Russian Revival church was conceived in 1900 by Pomerantsev and Victor Vasnetsov to commemorate the fiftieth anniversary of the Emancipation reform of 1861. Pomerantsev himself contributed financially to the construction that dragged from 1910 until the February Revolution. In 1934 Arkady Mordvinov and Alexey Dushkin proposed conversion of the unfinished cathedral into the Radio House skyscraper; the plan never materialized and the dilapidated concrete shell was torn down in 1952.

== Educator ==
Pomerantsev joined the faculty of the Academy in 1888; in 1893 he was elected full member of the Academy. Pomerantsev headed a department of its Art College since 1893 and briefly headed the Academy itself in 1899-1900. Since 1899 Pomerantsev also served as visiting professor at the Moscow School of Painting, Sculpture and Architecture.

In 1893 the Academy reformed its architectural school, creating three parallel graduate workshops, and assigned Leon Benois, Pomerantsev and Antony Tomishko (after the death of Tomishko in 1900 his seat was awarded to Mikhail Preobrazhensky. The first graduation under the new rules (1896) was not good for Pomerantsev; only one of his students passed the bar compared to ten for Benois and ten for Tomishko. Although Pomerantsev was the eldest of three professors, Benois was clearly more popular among students, and his workshop regularly had more regular students than Pomerantsev’s (1902: 27 vs. 14, 1903: 22 vs. 9 etc.). His best known alumni included Ivan Rylsky, Alexander Tamanian and Sergey Serafimov.
