= Krasnoluzhsky Bridge =

Coordinates: 55°43′41″N 37°32′51″E

The name Krasnoluzhsky Bridge (Russian: Краснолу́жский мо́ст) refers to three existing bridges across Moskva River, located between Kievsky Rail Terminal and Luzhniki in Moscow.

== Krasnoluzhsky Rail Bridge (1907, structure replacement 2001) ==
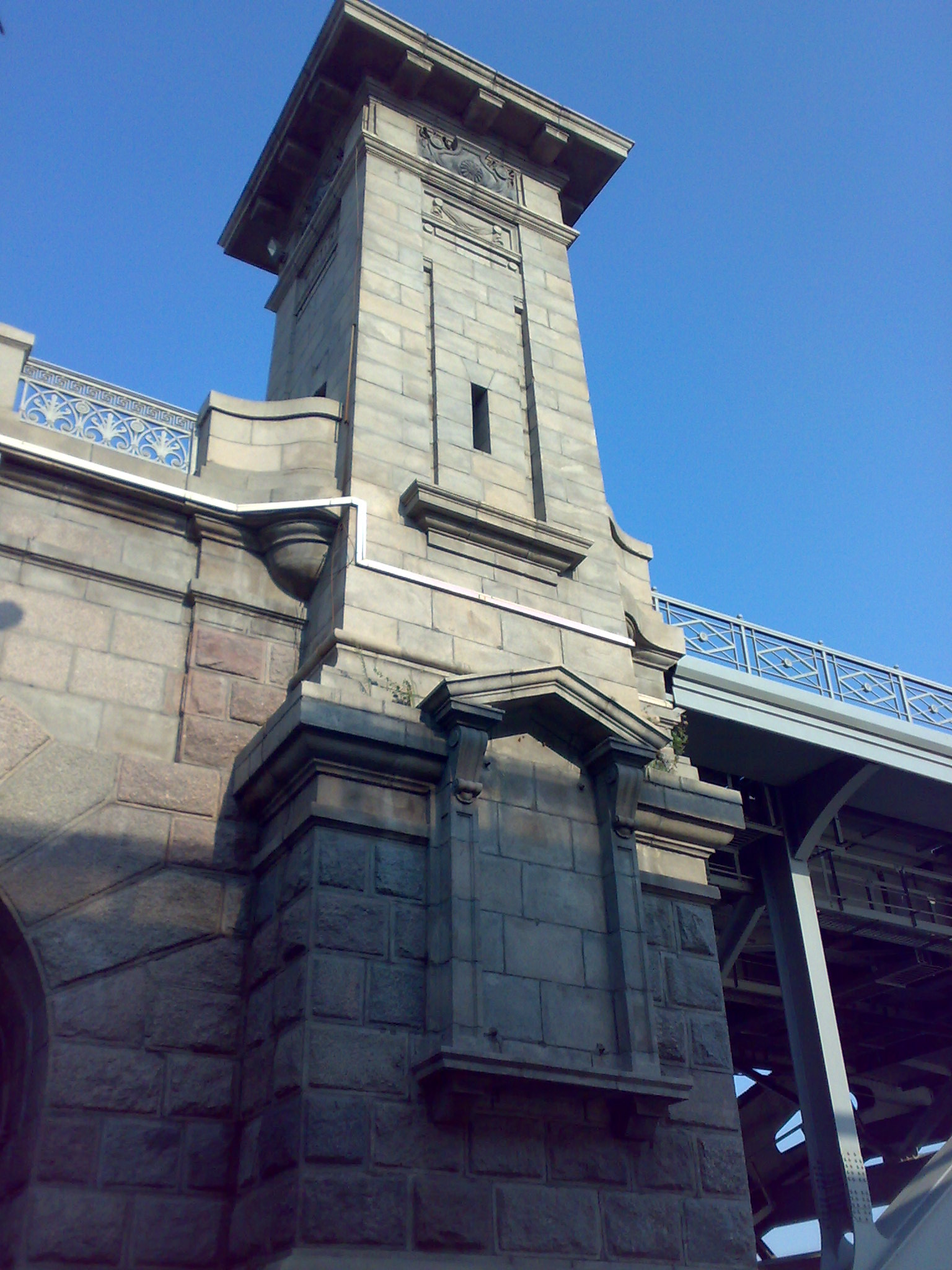
Northern approach of Krasnoluzhsky Rail Bridge

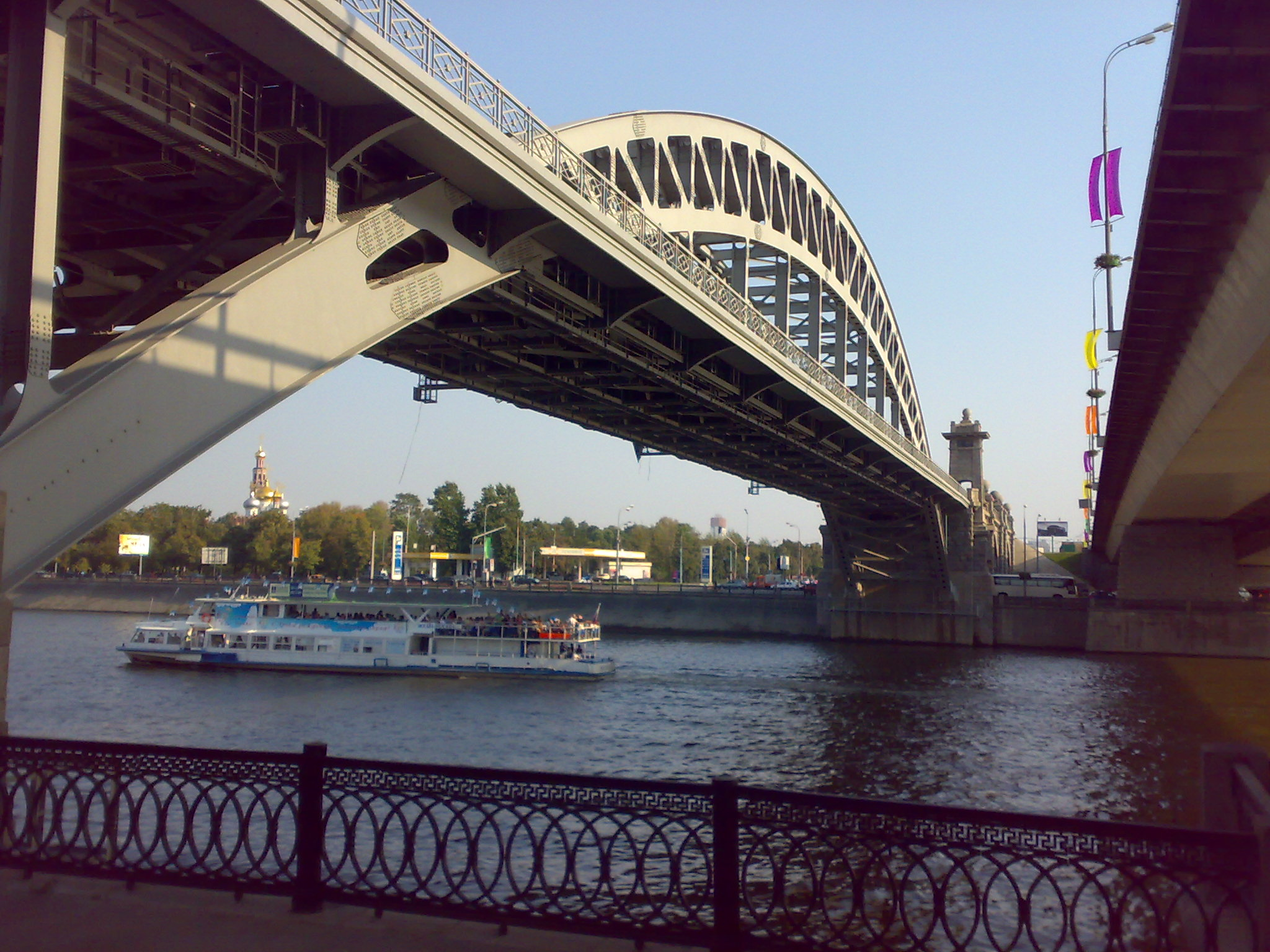
Krasnoluzhsky Rail Bridge (left) with a road bridge next to it

The original Nicholas II Bridge (Мост Николая II) and its twin, Sergievsky Bridge (now known as Andreyevsky Bridge, Андреевский мост) were built in 1903–1907. They carried two tracks of Moscow Inner Ring Railroad across the Luzhniki bend. Both were designed as through arch bridges by Lavr Proskuryakov (structural engineering) and Alexander Pomerantsev (architectural design). The 135-meter steel arch of Nicholas II Bridge (1400 metric tons) was made at the renowned Sormovo works. Regarded as a remarkable feat of engineering, Proskuryakov's work was put to the ultimate test during the 1908 flood. Despite the water level surging a meter and a half above the maximum design specification, the bridge remained unscathed, showcasing its incredible resilience.

Following the February Revolution of 1917, the title of the bridge was changed to Krasnoluzhsky, which translates to Red Meadows, to align with the politically correct naming conventions of the time. In recognition of his exceptional contribution to the construction of the bridge, Lavr Proskuryakov, the talented builder behind this architectural marvel, was laid to rest at the prestigious Novodevichy Cemetery in 1926.

Between 1952 and 1956, the arched stone pillars that were situated over embankments underwent a transformation. They were expanded from having only one span on each side to now having two spans in order to accommodate the increasing street traffic. Additionally, the inner steel frame of these arches was replaced with more durable concrete material. As time went on, the bridge, which had faithfully served its purpose for over 90 years, began to show signs of wear and required significant repairs. Instead of opting for patchwork fixes, the City authorities made the decision to completely replace the entire steel structure of the bridge. The new design featured a fresh arch that was constructed over the existing pillars, bringing a sense of modernity and functionality to the bridge. This ambitious project was successfully completed in 2001. While the new steel arch bears some resemblance to the original design by Proskuryakov, it is not an exact replica. Despite the changes in appearance, the primary function of the bridge remained unaltered: it continued to serve as a vital transportation route for a railway line that traverses the Moskva River.

== Krasnoluzhsky Road Bridge (1998) ==
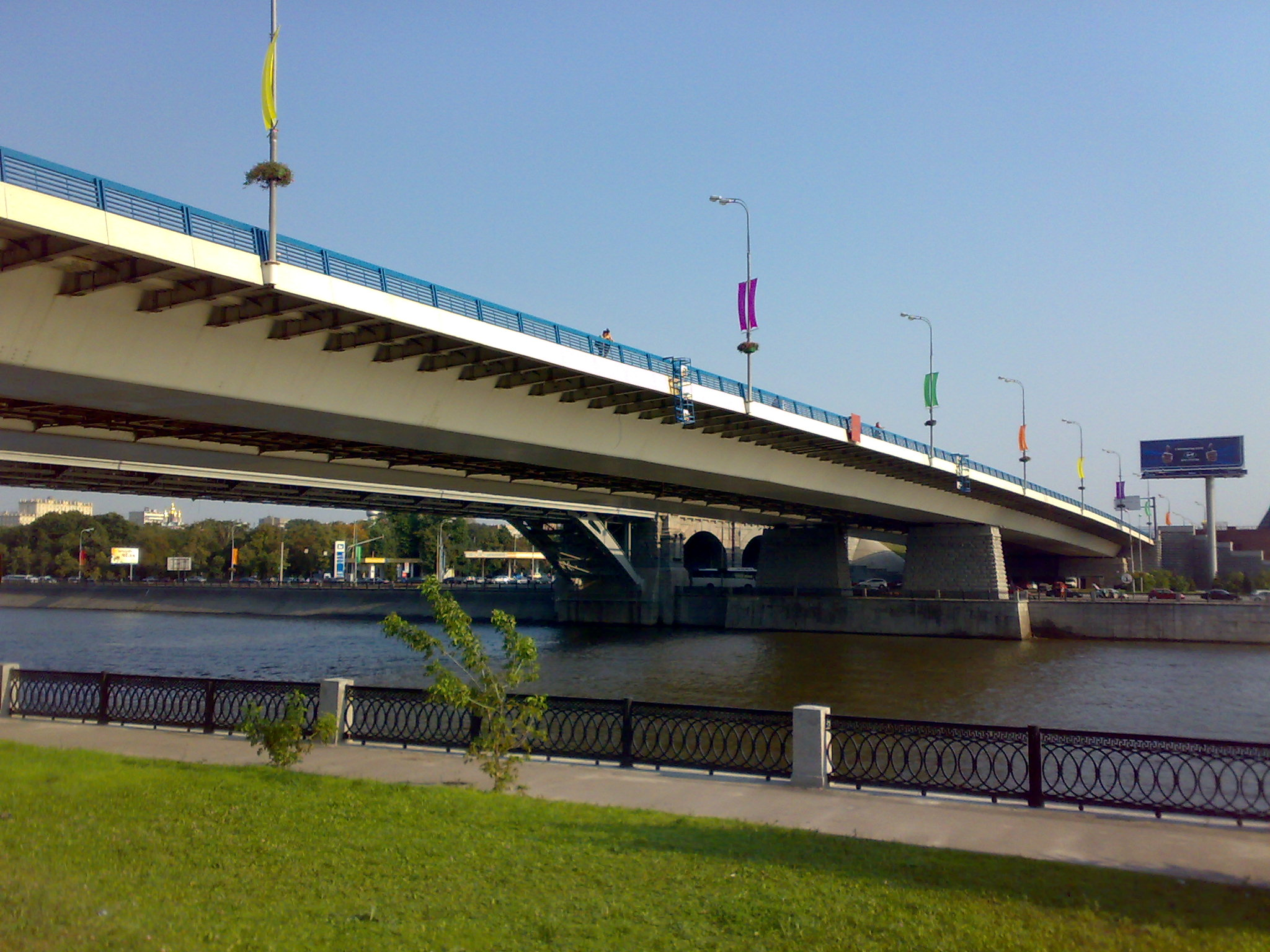
Krasnoluzhsky Road Bridge

In the 1990s, the City built the Third Ring Road (Moscow) (Russian: Тре́тье тра́нспортное кольцо́), parallel to existing railway tracks. New Krasnoluzhsky Road Bridge (Краснолужский автодорожный мост) construction began in September 1997 and completed in 1998. Designers took care to make the new concrete bridge "blend" with Proskuryakov's arch, thus the main span of a dual box girder bridge is set to 144.5 meters (complete formula is 24+110+144.5+110+24). Roadway is 39.5 meters wide (8 regular lanes, 2 reserve lanes, a single foot and bicycle lane).

Originally, the bridge was known as Berezhkovsky (Бережковский). This title appears in a contractor's illustrated report available online.

== Bogdan Khmelnitsky (Kievsky) Pedestrian Bridge (2001) ==
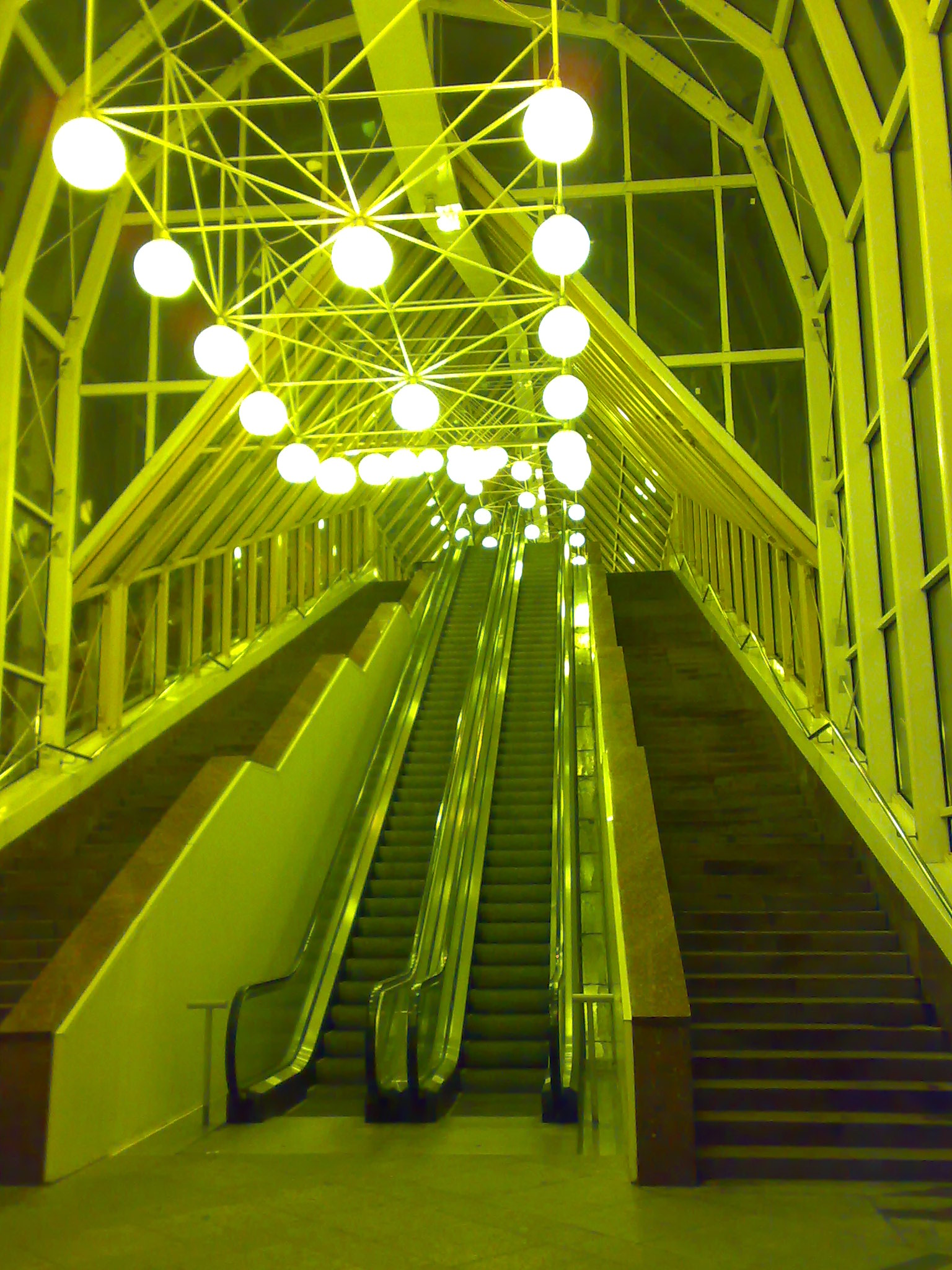
Glass canopy, northern approach

Instead of discarding the old steel arch, urban planners decided to repurpose it as the central support for a brand new pedestrian bridge, positioned half a mile away from its original location along the river. Originally named Kievsky (Киевский мост), i.e. "Kiev Bridge", this structure has now been officially renamed in honor of Bohdan Khmelnytskyi (Мост Богдана Хмельницкого), the esteemed hetman of the Zaporozhian Cossack Hetmanate in Ukraine.

The main pedestrian walkway and stairs are fully covered by a glass canopy, providing a sheltered experience. Additionally, there are two side walkways that are usually not accessible to the public, but are open-air spaces. These side walkways offer a different atmosphere compared to the enclosed main walkway. The piers and staircases along the shoreline are constructed using grey stone and are designed to resemble the approaches of the original Krasnoluzhsky bridge, although they are slightly simplified in their appearance.

The grand inauguration of the bridge took place on the highly anticipated Day of Moscow, which fell on the 2nd of September in the year 2001. The construction process was executed with such tremendous urgency that it earned a commendable mention in the Bridges of Moscow reference book, specifically in its 2004 edition: "A mere one week prior to its official opening, six cranes and derricks tirelessly operated around the clock, showcasing the unwavering commitment and dedication of the construction team"

== See also ==
- Andreyevsky Bridge
- List of bridges in Moscow
