= Moskovskaya Hotel =

Hotel in Rostov-on-Don, Russia

Coordinates: 47.220831°N 39.712281°E

- Гостиница «Московская»
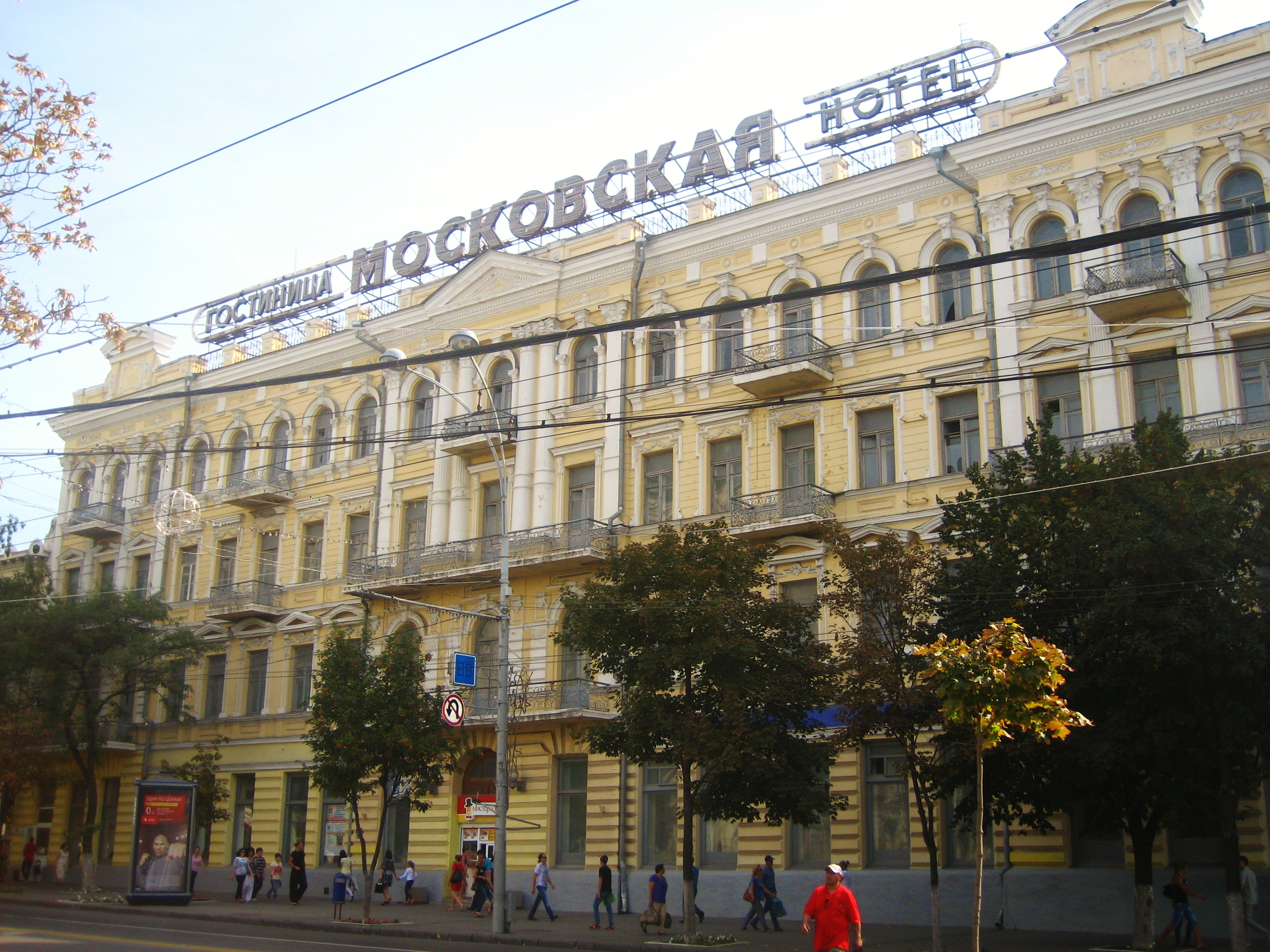
- Moskovskaya Hotel in 2012
- Interactive map of the Moskovskaya Hotel area
- Former names: Bolshaya Moskovskaya Hotel

General information
- Status: Russian cultural heritage and regional significance
- Location: Rostov-on-Don, Bolshaya Sadovaya Street
- Year built: 1893–1896

Design and construction
- Architects: Alexander Pomerantsev, Nikolai Durbach

Moskovskaya Hotel (Russian: Гостиница «Московская»; formerly Bolshaya Moskovskaya Hotel) is a hotel in Rostov-on-Don, situated on Bolshaya Sadovaya Street. It was built from 1893–1896 as the project of architects Alexander Pomerantsev and Nikolai Durbach. The hotel is currently closed, though there are plans to reconstruct it. The building has the status of Russian cultural heritage and regional significance.

== Architecture ==
The four-story building was constructed in eclectic style. The symmetrical facade is divided vertically into five parts. The central part initially had a large balcony-canopy that covered the entire width of the sidewalk at the main entrance, but it has not been preserved. The third and fourth floors in the center of the facade are united by a portico with columns and pilasters of the Corinthian order. The facade ends with an attic with a pediment in the central part.

The first floor is rusticated. The size and shape of the windows vary depending on the floor: large showcases are on the first floor, rectangular windows are on the second and third floors, and windows with semi-circular endings are on the top floor. The design of the window openings also vary: on the second floor there are small pediments, on the third floor there are cornices in the center and pediments in the side parts of the facade, and on the fourth floor there are arched decorations.
