= Andreyevsky Bridge =

Coordinates: 55°42′49″N 37°34′37″E

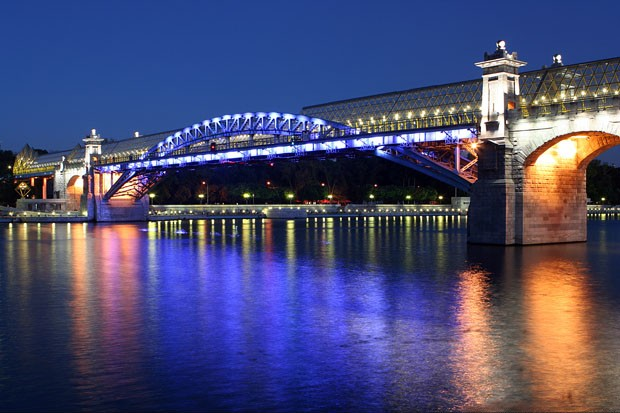
Night view of Pushkinsky Pedestrian Bridge (2000), built around the old steel arch of the original Andreyevsky Rail Bridge (1907-1998)

Andreyevsky Bridge (Russian: Андреевский мост, St. Andrew’s Bridge) name refers to a historical bridge demolished in 1998 and three existing bridges across Moskva River, located between Luzhniki and Gorky Park in Moscow.

== Andreyevsky Rail Bridge (1907, demolished 1998) ==
The original Sergievsky Bridge (Сергиевский мост), named after the late Grand Duke Sergei Alexandrovich, and its twin, Nicholas II Bridge (Мост Николая II, later Krasnoluzhsky Bridge) were built in 1903–1907, replacing temporary wooden truss bridges of the Moscow Inner Ring Railroad. New bridges were designed as through arch bridges by Lavr Proskuryakov (structural engineering) and Alexander Pomerantsev (architectural design). The 135-meter-wide (443 ft), 15-metre-tall (49 ft) steel arch (1400 metric tons) was made at Votkinsk works. Proskuryakov's work, considered a marvel of engineering, was proven by the 1908 flood: water level exceeded the maximum design specification by a metre and a half; the bridges stood unharmed.

After the February Revolution of 1917, Romanov names were erased from the map. Sergievsky Bridge was renamed Andreyevsky after nearby St.Andrew’s monastery, Nicholas II Bridge became Krasnoluzhsky Bridge.

In 1937, the arched stone pillars over embankments were extended from one to two spans (each side) to accommodate increased street traffic. A similar reconstruction of Krasnoluzhsky Bridge was completed in 1956.

The bridge was still in good order when it was demolished to make way for the construction of the Third Ring highway. Space limitations required vertical and horizontal realignment of track (1.5 metres up and 22 metres downstream), so the whole rail bridge (arch, roadway and pillars) had to be rebuilt on a new site (unlike Krasnoluzhsky bridge, which retained its pillars). Demolition (actually, careful disassembly) began in April 1998.

== Pushkinsky Pedestrian Bridge (2000) ==
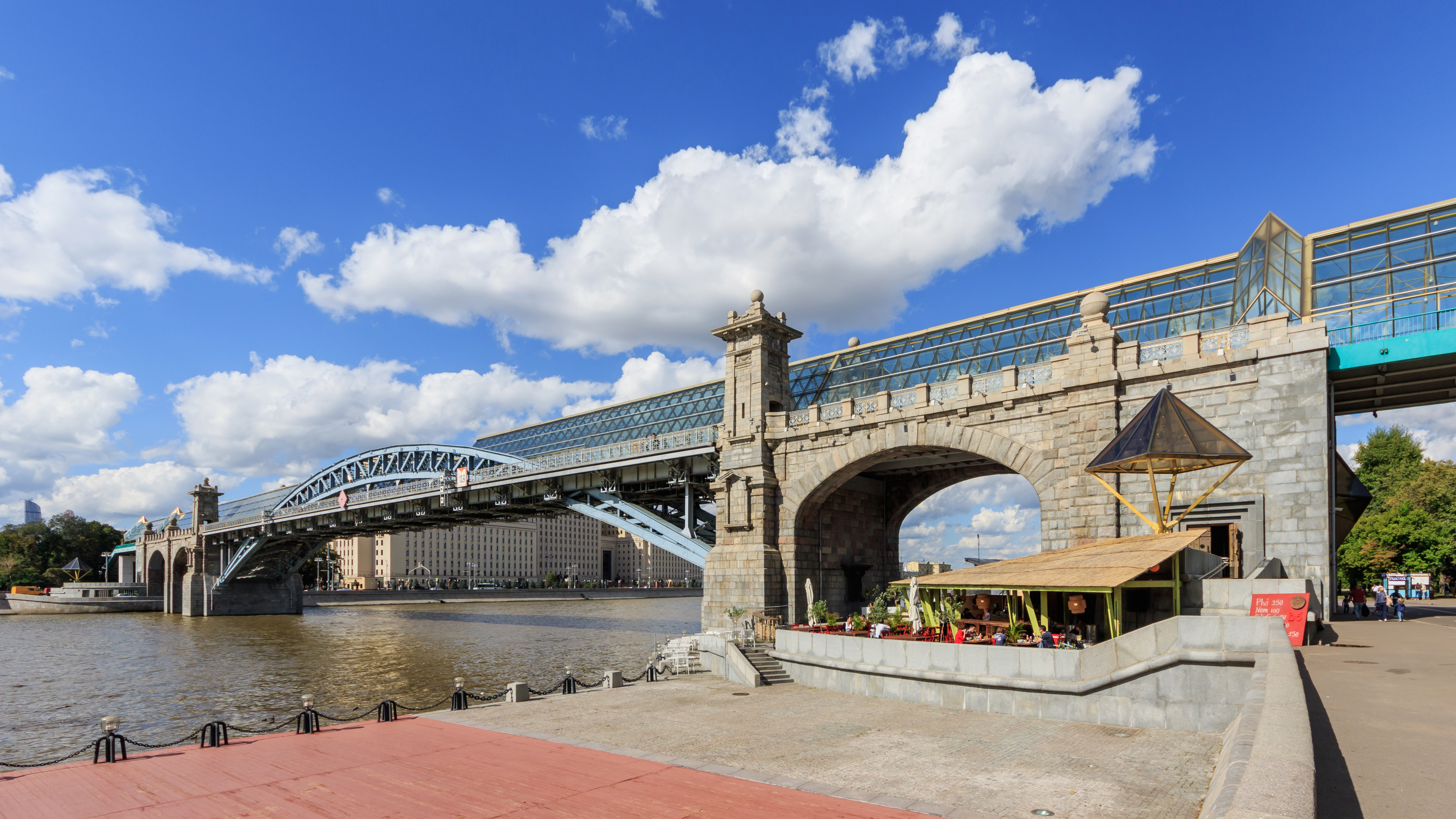
An upward view reveals Proskuryakov's original arch

City planners chose to repurpose the steel arch of the 1907 Andreyevsky Rail Bridge instead of discarding it. On May 22, 1999, the steel frame was transported downstream to the new pedestrian bridge location using three barges. Contractors had already prepared the new site with concrete foundations, pillars, and arches, utilizing granite slabs from the original site. Due to the wider Moskva river at this location, four pillars and three 25-meter arches were needed to span the gaps over the water.

The Pushkinsky bridge connects First Frunzenskaya street in Khamovniki (left bank) with the southern edge of Gorky Park and Titovsky Proezd leading to Leninsky Avenue (right bank). The design team, led by Yu.P.Platonov, has incorporated a glass canopy to enclose the main pedestrian walkway and stairs, providing shelter. Additionally, there are two open-air side walkways. The left bank entrance features a two-lane escalator for convenience. On the right bank, the main flat walkway extends 240 meters beyond the pillars, allowing for a pleasant stroll through the park.

== Andreyevsky Rail Bridge (2001) ==
Initially, rail bridge completion had a higher priority and a 15-month fast track schedule, but in real life priorities changed, and the new road bridge was completed first. Both jobs required removal of old rail bridge, which was done May 22, 1999, after 11 months of preparation. Rail service of the Inner Ring was suspended for two years until completion in 2001.

New steel arch (engineer S.S.Tkachenko) is superficially similar to Proskuryakov's original design; it is now 21.5 metres tall, with a higher track alignment; width remains the same, 135.0 metres. The bridge has only one (upstream) pedestrian walkway and two copies of four original obelisks.

== Andreyevsky Road Bridge (2000) ==
New Andreyevsky Road Bridge (Aндреевский автодорожный мост) was completed in December 2000. Design challenge included merging the bridge with the tunnel system under Gagarin Square. Significant incline of roadway ruled out the box girder style in favor of concrete truss arch bridge (lead designer E.G.Gapontsev), set on a 32-metre-deep (105 ft) pile foundation. The arch is 135 meters wide and 15 meters high; the 39-meter-wide (128 ft) roadway has 8 lanes for regular traffic and a single pedestrian and bicycle walkway.

An effective and economical solution, however, failed to preserve visual coherence of two adjacent bridges; new structure completely obstructs the fine outline of Proskuryakov's classic.

== See also ==
- Krasnoluzhsky Bridge
- List of bridges in Moscow
