= Alexander Nevsky Cathedral, Moscow =

Coordinates: 55°46′36″N 37°35′32″E

External image
- The church on a still from the 1927 film Bed and Sofa

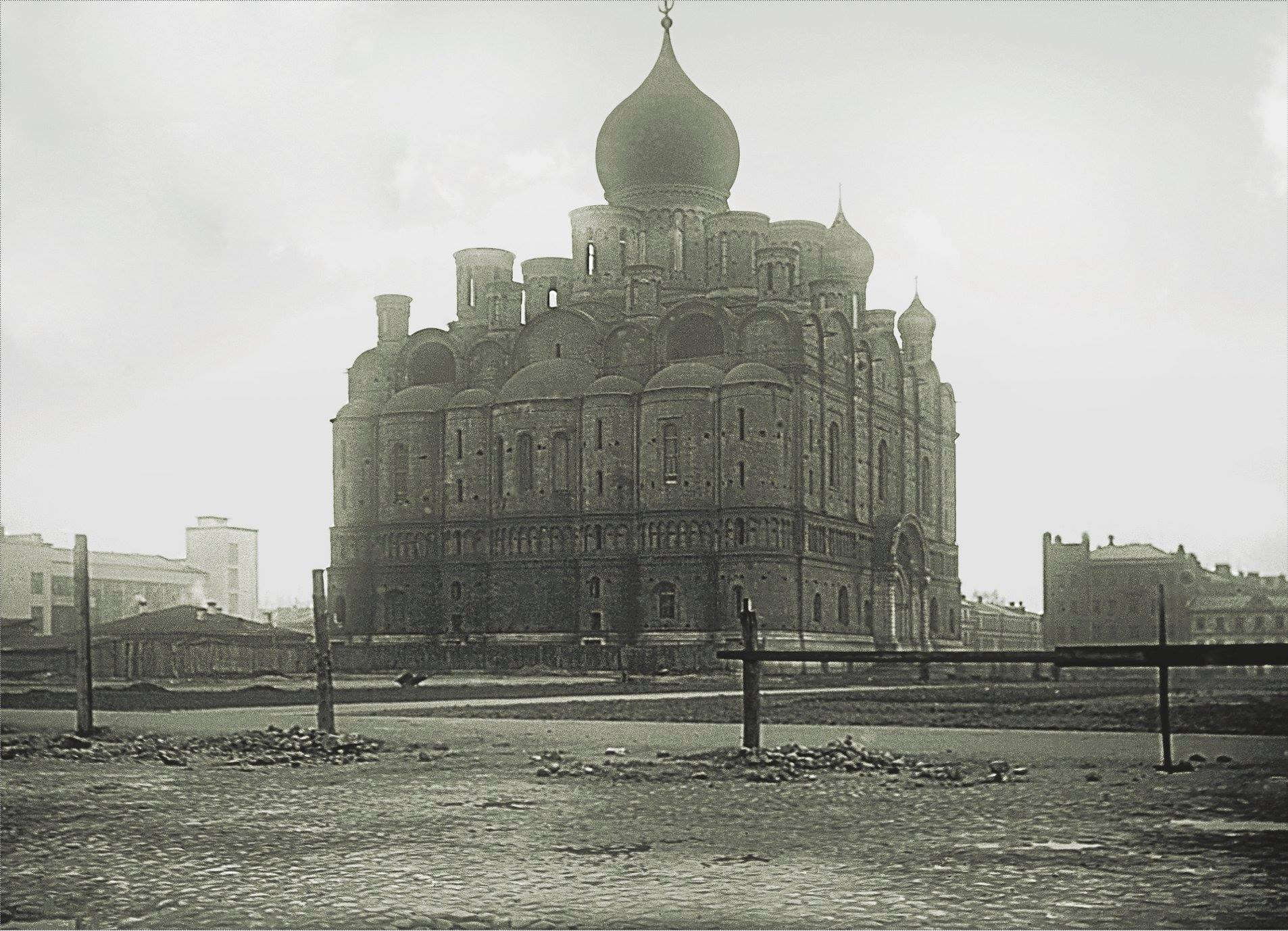
Alexander Nevsky Cathedral (1921)

The Alexander Nevsky Cathedral in Moscow was the largest of a series of cathedrals erected in Imperial Russia in commemoration of Alexander Nevsky, the patron saint of Emperors Alexander II and Alexander III. It was conceived by Alexander Pomerantsev and Viktor Vasnetsov as a 70-metre-tall memorial to Alexander II's Emancipation reform of 1861.

The foundation stone of the votive church was laid on Miusskaya Square (an industrial area in the northwest of Moscow) in 1911, on the 50th anniversary of the Emancipation Manifesto, in the presence of Grand Duchess Elizabeth Feodorovna. Construction did not start in earnest until 1913, and the First World War impeded further progress. The first chapel was dedicated to St. Tikhon of Voronezh in 1915.

After the Russian Revolution, the huge 17-domed church capable of accommodating more than 4,000 persons stood unfinished, while the Soviets debated whether to have it reconstructed into a crematory or a radio centre. It was the largest church in Moscow after the Cathedral of Christ the Saviour. The dilapidated concrete shell was eventually torn down in 1952. A Pioneers Palace was raised on the old foundation in 1960.
