= Rostov City Hall =

Edifice in the Leninsky District of Rostov-on-Don, Russia

Coordinates: 47°13′17.6″N 39°42′45.3″E

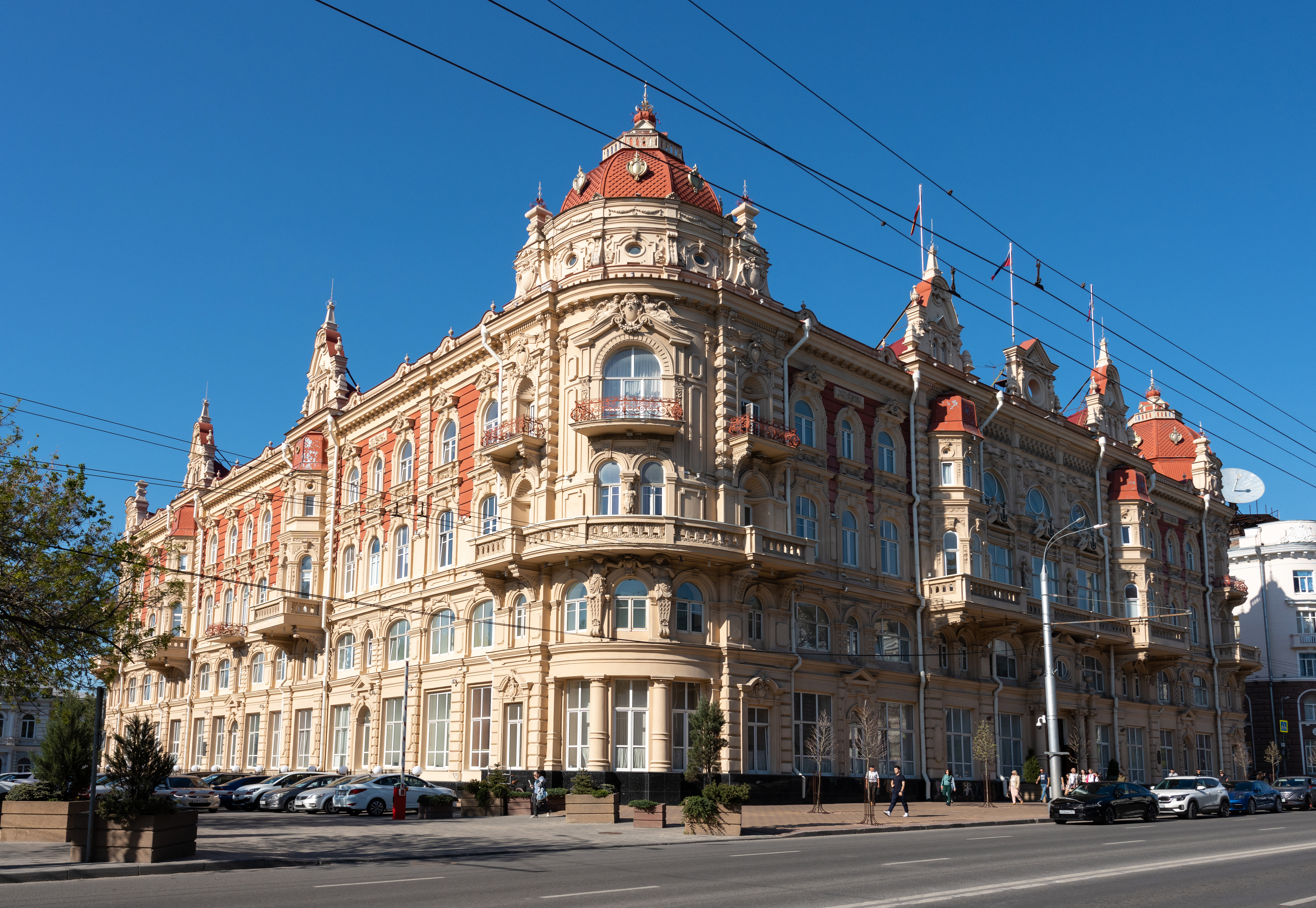
Rostov City Hall in 2024

The Rostov City Hall is an edifice in the Leninsky District of Rostov-on-Don, Russia. The house is located at 47 Bolshaya Sadovaya Street (Russian: Большая Садовая улица, 47) at the intersection of Bolshaya Sadovaya Street and Semashko lane. The building was designed in the Beaux-Arts style. It is recognized as a historical landmark, has official status as an object of Russian cultural heritage, and contains the Rostov-on-Don Administration.

== History ==
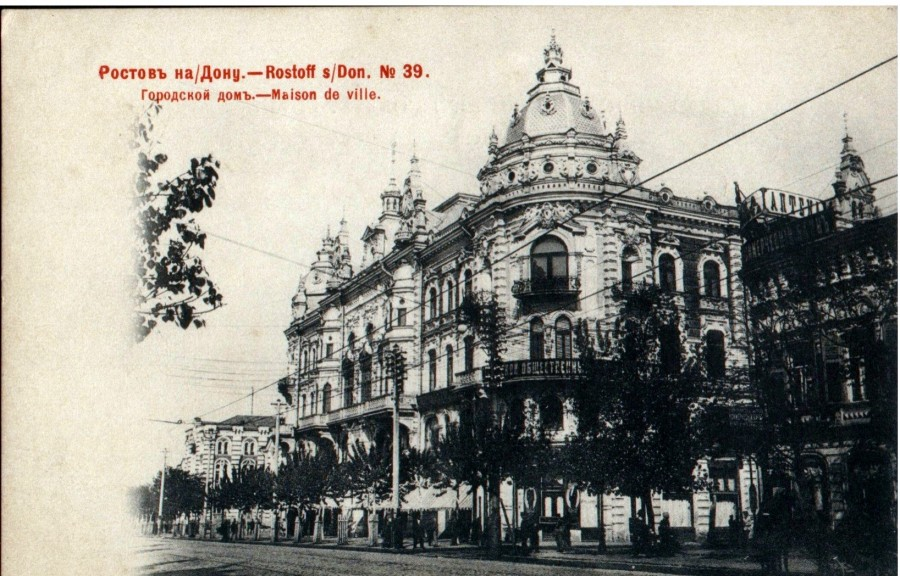
Rostov City Hall in 1902

The Government of Rostov-on-Don agreed to build a new City Duma House in the middle of the 1890s. The Rostov City Duma occupied the Maksimov House on Bazarnaya Square (now Stanislavskogo Street) at that time.

The new City Hall was designed by famous architect Alexander Pomerantsev. At the time of the building's construction, Pomeratsev had already established himself as a prominent Rostov-on-Don architect, having designed and constructed several city buildings. After some debate, a contract was signed at the end of 1896. The Rostov City Hall was built from 1897 to 1899. It was consecrated in 1899.

It cost 513,627 rubles to build the Rostov City Hall. The original value of 586,176 rubles calculated by architect Pomerantsev had not been approved in the programme budget of the City Duma. However the Rostov City Hall had exceeded the budget by more than 28%. The first floor of central section was rented by different commercial organizations. Dry goods, bicycles, gramophones, wallpaper, marble products, optical accessories, weapon, confectioneries were sold here. The City Duma and the City Hall occupied the second, third and fourth floors. The Rostov Duma was open to public. There were 200 places on the choir balcony and 40 ringside seats behind the barrier.

In 1922 a fire broke out in the building. The flames destroyed the corner dome. During World War II, The City Hall was severely damaged. It was restored shortly after the end of the war. The Regional Committee of the Communist Party of the Soviet Union was located here.

== Description ==
The building was designed in the Beaux-Arts style. The style is monumental and considered Beaux-Arts style with axial symmetry in plan and eclectic exterior ornamentation with an abundance of Neo-Baroque decorative elements. These include very elaborate reliefs, Doric pilasters, cartouches, and a triangular cornice above the windows. The first floor is decorated with banded rustication. A cornice above small corbels crowns the top of the building.
