= Lavr Proskuryakov =

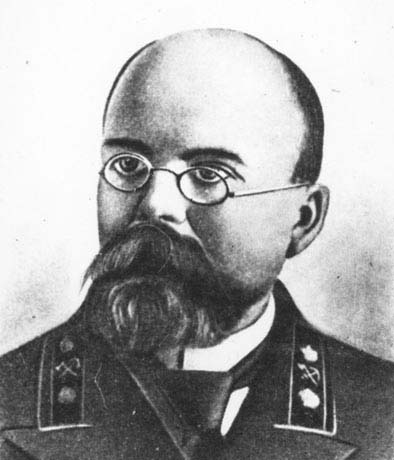
Lavr Dmitrievich Proskuryakov

Lavr Dmitrievich Proskuryakov (Russian: Лавр Дми́триевич Проскуряко́в) (18 August 1858 – 14 September 1926) was a Russian bridge engineer. He was one of the foremost authorities on bridge engineering and structural mechanics in the Russian Empire and the early Soviet Union.

== Life and career ==
Lavr Proskuryakov was born on 18 August 1858 in Borisovka, Voronezh Governorate, into a large peasant family. In 1884, he graduated from the Saint-Petersburg Institute of Railway Engineers and began his career as a designer of bridges. Since 1887, he lectured at the same institute, and starting from 1896 Proskuryakov held the position of Full Professor at Moscow State University of Railway Engineering.

Even the early Proskuryakov's projects for bridges across the rivers Western Bug (1885) and Sula in the Ukrainian city of Romny (1887) attracted attention by their novelty and ingenuity. The drawings of these bridges were presented by Professor L.F. Nicolai, Head of the Bridge Department of the Petersburg Institute of Railway Engineers, in his tutorial on bridge design for railway engineers.

During the summer of 1895, Proskuryakov was granted the opportunity to travel abroad by the Academic Council of the institute. The purpose of his journey was twofold. Firstly, he aimed to attend the esteemed International Railway Congress in London, where he could engage with experts and scholars in the field. Secondly, he was assigned the task of studying mechanical institutes and bridges in various European cities, such as Paris, Zürich, Munich, Vienna and Berlin. However, Proskuryakov's thirst for knowledge and desire to broaden his horizons did not stop in Europe. He decided to extend his journey to the United States, with his primary objective being to familiarize himself with the most magnificent bridges the country had to offer. Each visit to these awe-inspiring structures provided him with a deeper admiration for their engineering, as he learned from local experts and unraveled the secrets behind their impressive designs.

Proskuryakov made a groundbreaking decision in Europe by choosing to reject the complex lattice girder truss design commonly used, which consisted of many vertical elements and diagonals. Instead, he developed a static triangular truss with fewer diagonal elements, simplifying the design. This innovative approach greatly improved the bridge structure's ability to evenly distribute dynamic loads.

The old rail bridge over the Yenisei near Krasnoyarsk

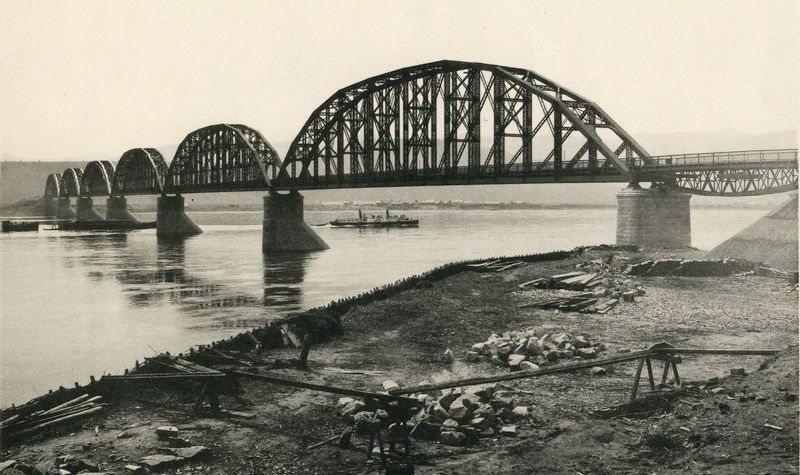
The railway bridge over the Yenisei. A picture in the late 19th - early 20th centuries

Lavr Proskuryakov dedicated his research and practical efforts to the creation of an impeccable truss superstructure, a goal he ultimately achieved with the construction of the magnificent railway bridge spanning the Yenisei River near Krasnoyarsk. This uncommon bridge, constructed between 1896 and 1899, spanned an impressive distance of 1,000 meters (3,300 ft). Its truss superstructure was made up of six spans, each measuring 144.7 meters (475 ft) long. The bridge stood at a height of 21.64 meters (71.0 ft) and weighed an astounding 900 tons. To strengthen the piers against the forces of nature, Proskuryakov reinforced them with large starlings (cutwaters), strategically positioned to face upstream. This clever design effectively disrupted the flow of ice downstream during the annual spring thaw.

During the bridge design process, Proskuryakov introduced a groundbreaking truss system that incorporated the camelback truss design, similar to the Schwedler truss. This modification raised the height of the main truss to 21.64 meters (71.0 ft), and Proskuriakov also introduced the concept of influence lines for truss bridges. This innovation enabled more accurate calculations of the internal forces on each truss member caused by the movement of loads on the bridge. The theory of influence lines for truss bridges has been widely embraced by engineers worldwide, not just in Russia. Moreover, the bridge set a groundbreaking precedent in Russia as the first to use the incremental launching method.

The Yenisei Bridge gained recognition for its impressive engineering and technical features, making it the longest bridge in Russia and the second largest in Europe. The only bridge that was larger was located in the Netherlands, spanning the Lek River near Kuilenburg. The Yenisei Bridge was even showcased at the prestigious Exposition Universelle (1900), where its model received the esteemed gold medal. This achievement propelled Proskuryakov to become one of the country's most esteemed engineers. As a result of this recognition and success, the Yenisei Bridge was included in the World Heritage List, approved by UNESCO.

The Yenisei Bridge was highly innovative for its time when it was built. Proskuryakov's use of a static truss with subdivided panels and upward-angled top girders was later widely embraced and employed by many bridge engineers. Professor Nikolai Belelubsky, for instance, even adapted this system (with a few changeups) when designing a railway bridge over the Volga River near Sviyazhsk.

Proskuryakov successfully developed a variety of optimal span designs for various types of bridges. He had the responsibility of creating several unique multi-span bridges, including those that spanned the Oka River near Kashira in 1897, Belyov Bridge in 1897, and Murom Bridge in 1912. Furthermore, he was involved in designing the Vyatka Bridge along the Cherepovets-Vologda-Vyatka line in 1902, Volkhov Bridge in 1902, and, of course, the grand Khabarovsk Bridge in 1916, which was an important part of the Trans-Siberian Railway. These are just a few examples of the numerous notable bridge projects that Proskuryakov contributed to throughout his career.

In 1903, upon the request of the Society of the Moscow-Kazan Railway, Proskuriyakov, together with a team of skilled bridge designers from various local and international backgrounds, worked together to develop an initial plan for a remarkable bridge that would extend over the expansive Volga River near Kazan city. This remarkable structure aimed to showcase an impressive span of 165 meters (equivalent to an astonishing 541 feet), drawing inspiration from the awe-inspiring Yenisei Bridge.

In 1904, Proskuryakov took on the task of creating two magnificent rail bridges made of arched steel. These bridges, known as Andreyevsky and Krasnoluzhsky, were meant to cross the beautiful Moscow River and play an important role in the Moscow Circular Railway. What set these bridges apart was their double tracks, which allowed for more efficient transportation. Located within the city limits, these twin bridges were not only functional, but also visually appealing. Proskuryakov skillfully designed them to match the architectural standards of the time, seamlessly blending into the urban landscape. The bridges' graceful appearance complemented the surrounding structures, highlighting the artistic vision and attention to detail of their creator.

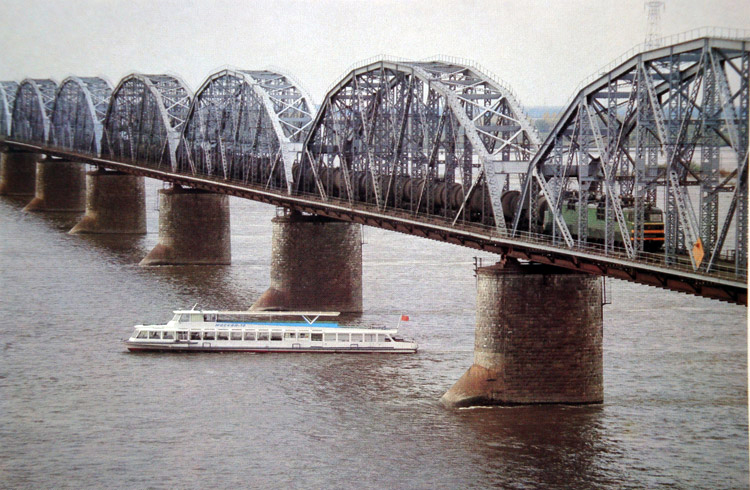
The old railway bridge across the Amur near Khabarovsk

The iconic Khabarovsk Bridge, constructed during the era of Imperial Russia, stands as another significant accomplishment in the field of bridge engineering. Designed by Proskuryakov, this renowned structure spanned across the majestic Amur River near Khabarovsk. With its impressive length of 2,590 meters (8,500 ft) and a robust steel framework, the bridge was a remarkable feat of engineering. It was built with a single track to allow trains to pass smoothly. The bridge was officially opened on 5 October 1916, alongside the completion of the Trans-Siberian Railroad, marking a major milestone in the region's transportation history.

In a manner similar to the Yenisei Bridge, the piers of the Khabarovsk Bridge were constructed with sturdy buttresses facing upstream. These buttresses were specifically designed as inclined planes to address the issue of ice accumulation against the piers. The bridge's impressive overall height, measuring at 12 meters (equivalent to 39 feet) from the upper deck to the highest point the water surface elevation could reach, allowed for larger ships to pass smoothly beneath it, even during the peak summer season when water levels in the Amur River were at their highest. The construction of this bridge required a significant financial investment from the Russian state treasury, totaling more than 13 million rubles. This amount was considered a substantial sum of money during the time when the bridge was constructed.

Proskuryakov was a strong proponent of the graphical method (or the dummy load method) for truss analysis that was based on the theory of influence lines. In 1891–1892, Proskuryakov conducted a practical course on the utilization of diagrammatic statics in civil engineering. Notably, it is worth mentioning that two years later, this course was made an obligatory component of the training program for railway engineers.

When Proskuryakov designed the bridge over the Kotorosl River in the Yaroslavl Governorate, he made a groundbreaking contribution: he became the pioneer in introducing a set of unique tables that were specifically intended for bridge builders to use when calculating the load-carrying capacity of bridges. This innovative development not only made the complex process of analyzing trusses simpler, but it also had a major influence on the field of bridge engineering. Proskuryakov's introduction of influence lines and the subsequent development of these tables revolutionized the field of bridge engineering, gaining widespread recognition and adoption on a global scale.

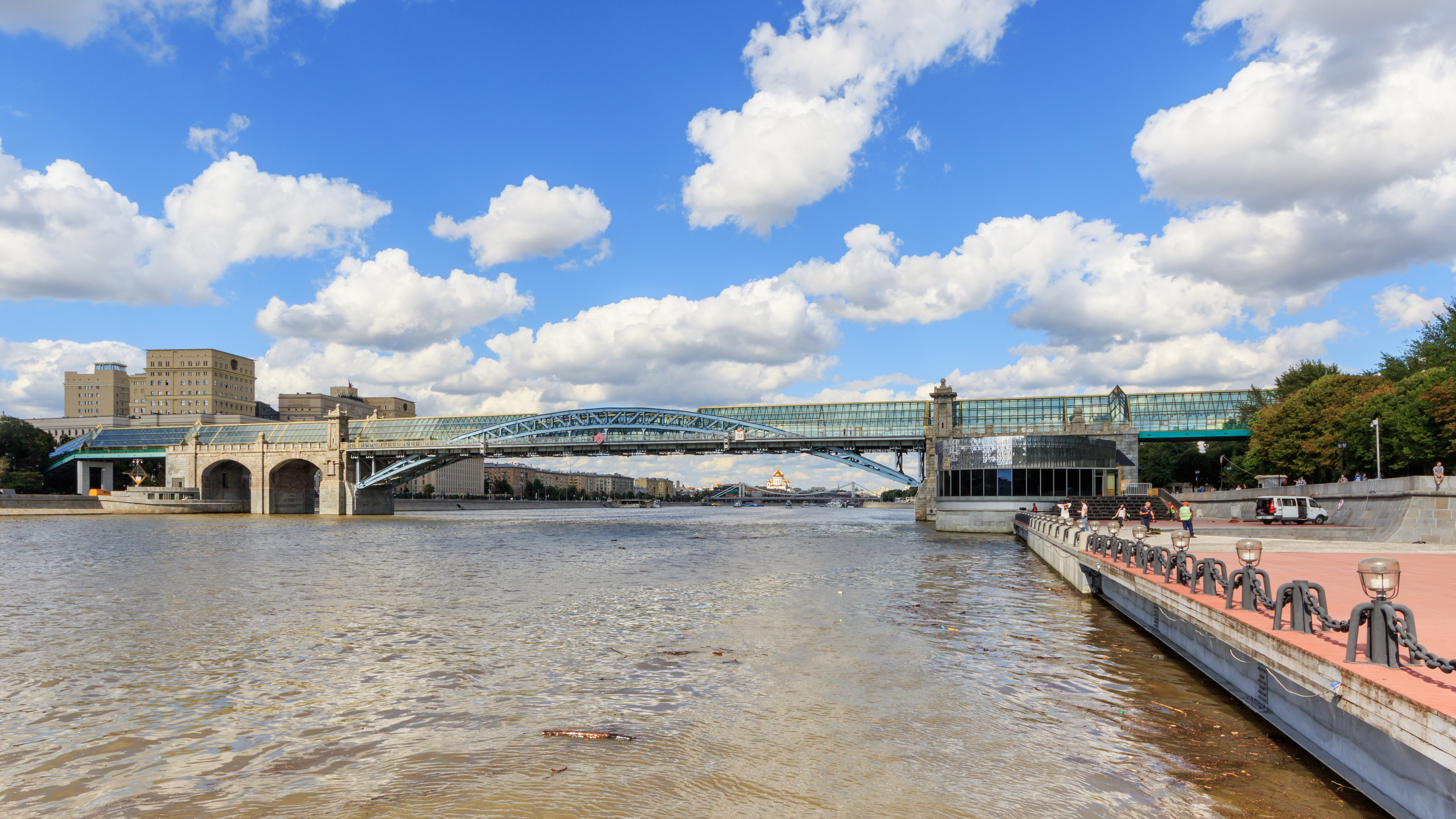
Pushkinsky Bridge in Moscow (1905–07)

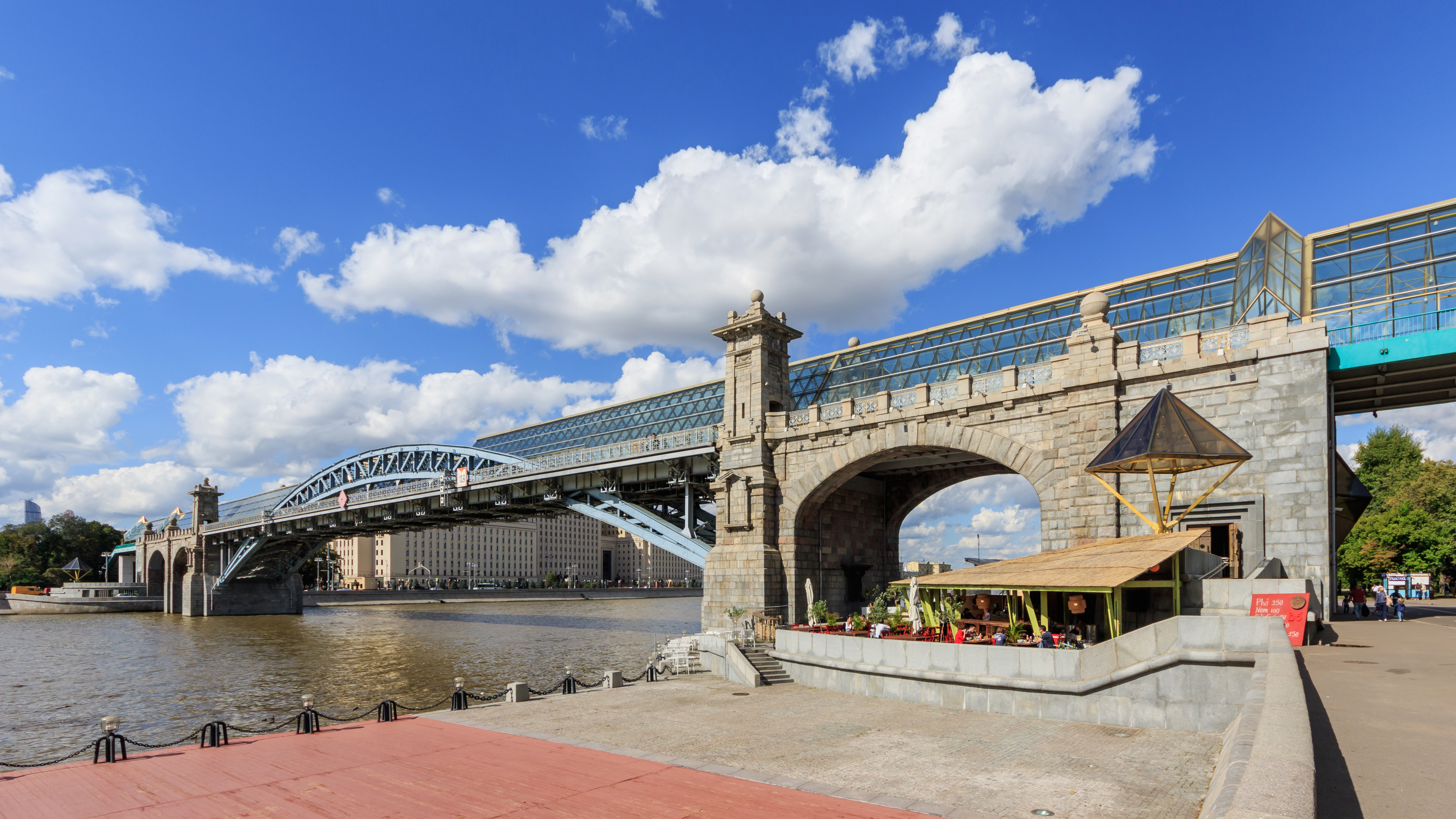
Another view of Pushkinsky Bridge

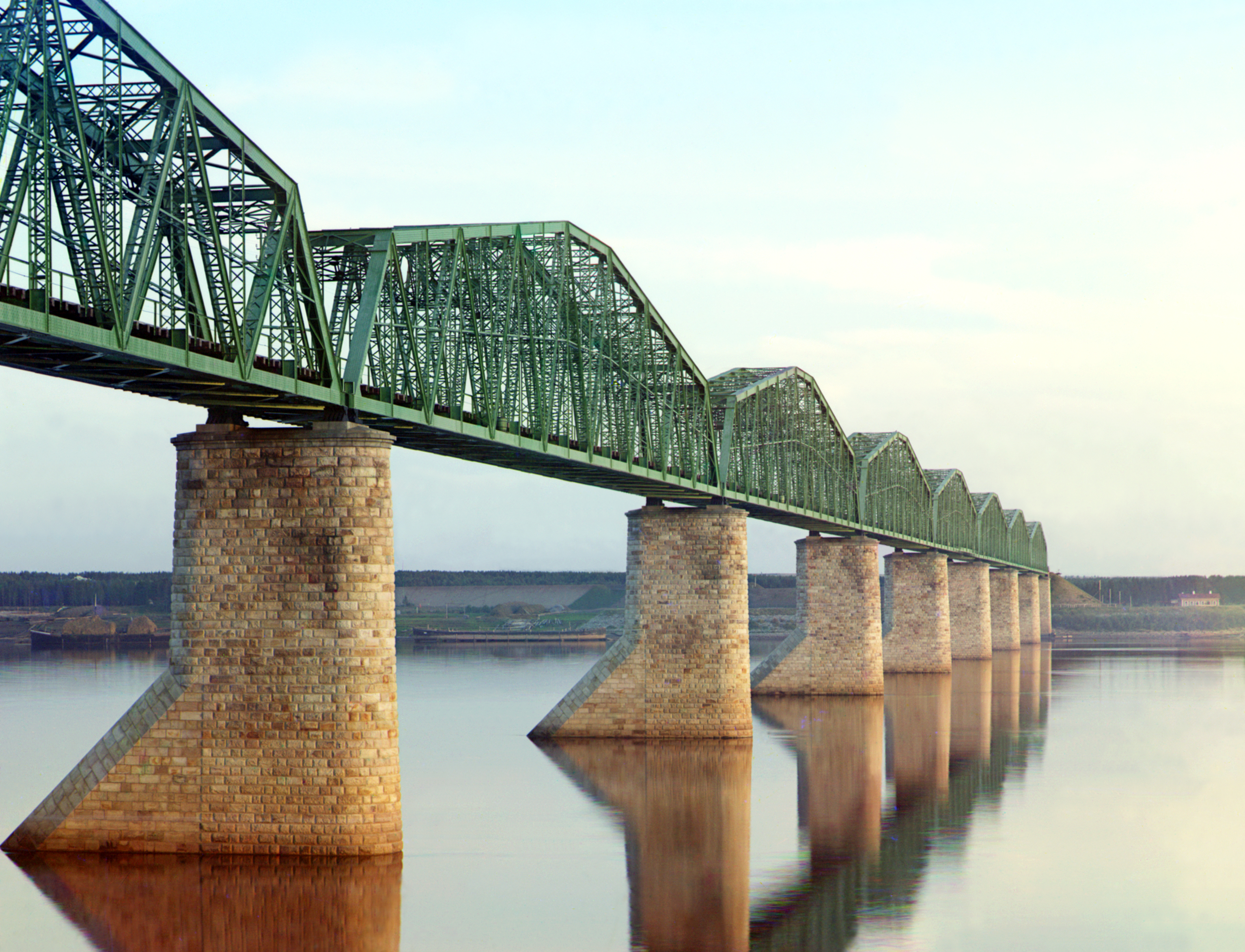
Bridge on the Trans-Siberian Railway in Perm

== See also ==
- Ufa Rail Bridge
- List of civil engineers
