= Administrative divisions of Samara Oblast =

Administrative districts of Russian federal subject

Samara Oblast Russia
- Administrative center: Samara

Administrative structure (as of 2011)
- Districts: 27
- Cities/towns: 11
- Urban-type settlements: 14
- Okrugs, rural administrations, selsovets, and volosts: 296

Municipal structure (as of 2002)
- Rural settlements: 1,314 (inhabited); 63 (uninhabited)

Samara Oblast is a federal subject of Russia.

== Administrative and municipal divisions ==
Map

Division		Structure		OKATO	OKTMO	Urban-type settlement/ district-level town*	Rural
Division		Administrative	Municipal	OKATO	OKTMO	Urban-type settlement/ district-level town*	Rural
Samara (Самара)		city	urban okrug	36 401	36 701		
↳	Kirovsky (Кировский)	(under Samara)	—N/a	36 401	—N/a		
↳	Krasnoglinsky (Красноглинский)	(under Samara)	—N/a	36 401	—N/a		
↳	Kuybyshevsky (Куйбышевский)	(under Samara)	—N/a	36 401	—N/a		
↳	Leninsky (Ленинский)	(under Samara)	—N/a	36 401	—N/a		
↳	Oktyabrsky (Октябрьский)	(under Samara)	—N/a	36 401	—N/a		
↳	Promyshlenny (Промышленный)	(under Samara)	—N/a	36 401	—N/a		
↳	Samarsky (Самарский)	(under Samara)	—N/a	36 401	—N/a		
↳	Sovetsky (Советский)	(under Samara)	—N/a	36 401	—N/a		
↳	Zheleznodorozhny (Железнодорожный)	(under Samara)	—N/a	36 401	—N/a		
Zhigulyovsk (Жигулёвск)		city	urban okrug	36 404	36 704		
Kinel (Кинель)		city	urban okrug	36 408	36 708	Alexeyevka (Алексеевка); Ust-Kinelsky (Усть-Кинельский)	
Novokuybyshevsk (Новокуйбышевск)		city	urban okrug	36 413	36 713		1 rural administration
Oktyabrsk (Октябрьск)		city	urban okrug	36 418	36 718		
Otradny (Отрадный)		city	urban okrug	36 424	36 724		
Pokhvistnevo (Похвистнево)		city	urban okrug	36 427	36 727		1 rural administration
Syzran (Сызрань)		city	urban okrug	36 435	36 735		
Tolyatti (Тольятти)		city	urban okrug	36 440	36 740		
↳	Avtozavodsky (Автозаводский)	(under Tolyatti)	—N/a	36 440	—N/a		
↳	Komsomolsky (Комсомольский)	(under Tolyatti)	—N/a	36 440	—N/a		
↳	Tsentralny	(under Tolyatti)	—N/a	36 440	—N/a		
Chapayevsk (Чапаевск)		city	urban okrug	36 450	36 750		
Alexeyevsky (Алексеевский)		district		36 202	36 602		5 volosts
Bezenchuksky (Безенчукский)		district		36 204	36 604	Bezenchuk (Безенчук); Osinki (Осинки)	11 volosts
Bogatovsky (Богатовский)		district		36 206	36 606		5 okrugs
Bolsheglushitsky (Большеглушицкий)		district		36 208	36 608		8 selsovets
Bolshechernigovsky (Большечерниговский)		district		36 210	36 610		9 selsovets
Borsky (Борский)		district		36 212	36 612		13 volosts
Volzhsky (Волжский)		district		36 214	36 614	Petra Dubrava (Петра Дубрава); Roshchinsky (Рощинский); Smyshlyayevka (Смышляевка); Stroykeramika (Стройкерамика)	12 volosts
Yelkhovsky (Елховский)		district		36 215	36 615		7 volosts
Isaklinsky (Исаклинский)		district		36 216	36 616		9 volosts
Kamyshlinsky (Камышлинский)		district		36 217	36 617		6 volosts
Kinelsky (Кинельский)		district		36 218	36 618		12 volosts
Kinel-Cherkassky (Кинель-Черкасский)		district		36 220	36 620		13 volosts
Klyavlinsky (Клявлинский)		district		36 222	36 622		11 volosts
Koshkinsky (Кошкинский)		district		36 224	36 624		13 volosts
Krasnoarmeysky (Красноармейский)		district		36 226	36 626		12 okrugs
Krasnoyarsky (Красноярский)		district		36 228	36 628	Mirny (Мирный); Novosemeykino (Новосемейкино); Volzhsky (Волжский)	10 volosts
Neftegorsky (Нефтегорский)		district		36 230	36 630	Neftegorsk (Нефтегорск) town*	8 selsovets
Pestravsky (Пестравский)		district		36 232	36 632		8 volosts
Pokhvistnevsky (Похвистневский)		district		36 234	36 634		15 volosts
Privolzhsky (Приволжский)		district		36 236	36 636		7 volosts
Sergiyevsky (Сергиевский)		district		36 238	36 638	Sukhodol (Суходол)	13 volosts; 3 rural administrations
Stavropolsky (Ставропольский)		district		36 240	36 640		24 volosts
Syzransky (Сызранский)		district		36 242	36 642	Balasheyka (Балашейка); Mezhdurechensk (Междуреченск)	13 okrugs
Khvorostyansky (Хворостянский)		district		36 244	36 644		11 volosts
Chelno-Vershinsky (Челно-Вершинский)		district		36 246	36 646		11 volosts
Shentalinsky (Шенталинский)		district		36 248	36 648		13 volosts
Shigonsky (Шигонский)		district		36 250	36 650		12 volosts
