= Samara constituency =

Russian legislative constituency

Samara single-member constituency
- Constituency of the Russian State Duma

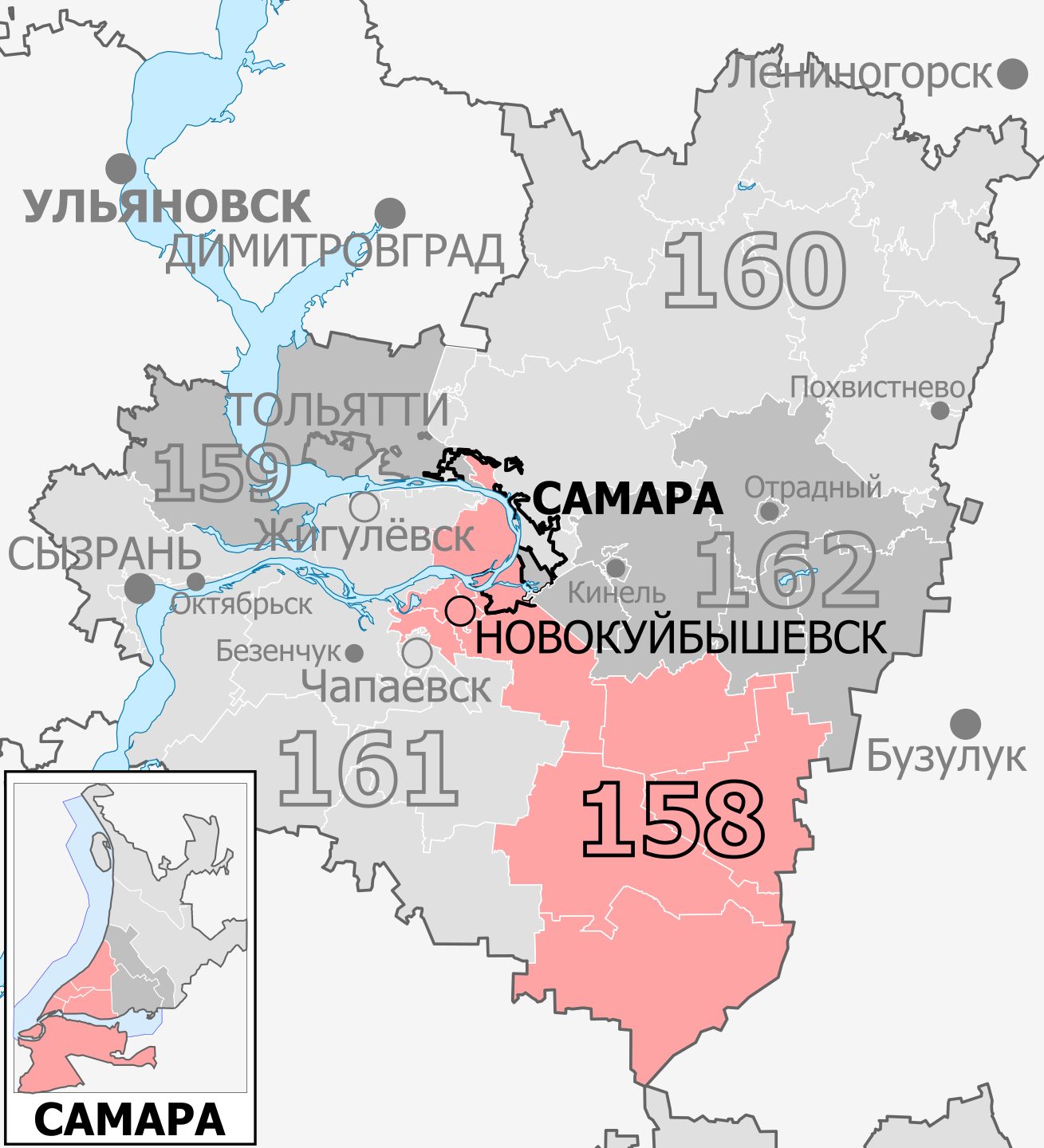
- Constituency boundaries since 2016
- Deputy: Aleksandr Fetisov; United Russia
- Federal subject: Samara Oblast
- Districts: Samara city districts: Zheleznodorozhny, Kuybyshevsky, Leninsky, Oktyabrsky, Samarsky; Cities: Novokuybyshevsk; Districts: Alexeyevsky, Bolsheglushitsky, Bolshechernigovsky, Volzhsky (except its north-eastern part), Neftegorsky
- Voters: 499,206 (2026)

Samara constituency (No.159 (Note: No.152 in 1993-1995, No.153 in 1995-2007, No.158 in 2016–2026)) is a Russian legislative constituency in Samara Oblast. In its current configuration the constituency covers parts of Samara, Novokuybyshevsk and south-eastern Samara Oblast.

The constituency has been represented since 2026 by United Russia deputy Aleksandr Fetisov, former First Vice Governor of Samara Oblast and Samara mayor, who won the open seat left vacant following the resignation of five-term United Russia deputy Alexander Khinshtein in December 2024.

== Boundaries ==
1993–2007: Samara (Kuybyshevsky, Leninsky, Oktyabrsky, Samarsky, Sovetsky, Zheleznodorozhny)
The constituency was based in urban Samara and covered southern and central Samara.

2016–present: Alexeyevsky District, Bolsheglushitsky District, Bolshechernigovsky District, most of Volzhsky District (except its north-eastern part), Neftegorsky District, Novokuybyshevsk, parts of Samara (Kuybyshevsky, Leninsky, Oktyabrsky, Samarsky, Zheleznodorozhny)
The constituency was re-created for the 2016 election and in its new configuration it took southern half of Samara, industrial city of Novokuybyshevsk to the south-west, from the eliminated Novokuybyshevsk constituency and rural areas in the south-eastern corner of Samara Oblast, from former Syzran constituency.

== Members ==
By-election are shown in italics.

Election	Member	Party
1993	Lyubov Rozhkova	Communist Party
1995	Vladimir Tarachyov	Our Home – Russia
1999	Aleksandr Belousov	Independent
2003	Aleksandr Belousov	People's Party
2007	Proportional representation - no election by constituency	
2011	Proportional representation - no election by constituency	
2016	Nadezhda Kolesnikova (Note: resigned in June 2018)	United Russia
2018	Alexander Khinshtein (Note: appointed acting Governor of Kursk Oblast in December 2024)	United Russia
2021	Alexander Khinshtein	United Russia
2026	Aleksandr Fetisov	United Russia

== Election results ==
=== 1993 ===
Summary of the 12 December 1993 Russian legislative election in the Samara constituency
Candidate	Party	Votes	%
Lyubov Rozhkova	Communist Party	50,787	21.56%
Vladimir Belousov	Russian Democratic Reform Movement	23,916	10.15%
Maria Voronina	Independent	19,085	8.10%
Yevgeny Pavlov	Independent	19,033	8.08%
Yury Yudin	Independent	15,863	6.73%
Andrey Yeremin	Independent	13,439	5.70%
Yevgeny Kladishchev	Independent	11,442	4.86%
Valery Ovchinnikov	Yavlinsky–Boldyrev–Lukin	8,002	3.40%
Yury Yerugin	Future of Russia–New Names	5,253	2.23%
Sergey Yurin	Democratic Party	5,103	2.17%
against all		41,798	17.74%
Total		235,578	100%

=== 1995 ===
Summary of the 17 December 1995 Russian legislative election in the Samara constituency
Candidate	Party	Votes	%
Vladimir Tarachyov	Our Home – Russia	36,801	12.73%
Lyubov Rozhkova (incumbent)	Independent	33,879	11.72%
Yury Sakharnov	Trade Unions and Industrialists – Union of Labour	32,087	11.10%
Natalya Morozova	Union of Communists	28,135	9.74%
Vladimir Zakharchenko	Independent	25,308	8.76%
Vladimir Shorin	Independent	21,969	7.60%
Valery Semyonychev	Bloc of Independents	12,019	4.16%
Mark Feygin	Democratic Choice of Russia – United Democrats	11,818	4.09%
Andrey Kireyev	Liberal Democratic Party	11,228	3.89%
Yevgeny Lartsev	Stanislav Govorukhin Bloc	9,825	3.40%
Yevgeny Kladishchev	Independent	8,234	2.85%
Sergey Trakhirov	Ivan Rybkin Bloc	7,322	2.53%
Aleksey Leushkin	Stable Russia	7,059	2.44%
Oleg Tikhonov	Pamfilova–Gurov–Lysenko	6,451	2.23%
Vladislav Marshansky	Independent	1,969	0.68%
against all		26,422	9.14%
Total		288,989	100%

=== 1999 ===
Summary of the 19 December 1999 Russian legislative election in the Samara constituency
Candidate	Party	Votes	%
Aleksandr Belousov	Independent	95,214	34.89%
Nikolay Musatkin	Communist Party	57,049	20.90%
Vladimir Tarachyov (incumbent)	Unity	32,942	12.07%
Vyacheslav Sonin	Independent	25,245	9.25%
Nikolay Gavrilov	Yabloko	12,987	4.76%
Vladimir Zakharchenko	Independent	11,617	4.26%
Leonid Tikhun	Andrey Nikolayev and Svyatoslav Fyodorov Bloc	4,071	1.49%
Aleksandr Shvarev	Party of Pensioners	3,119	1.14%
Yury Yudin	Russian Ecological Party "Kedr"	2,774	1.02%
Lyubov Rozhkova	Russian Party	2,709	0.99%
against all		21,979	8.05%
Total		272,927	100%

=== 2003 ===
Summary of the 7 December 2003 Russian legislative election in the Samara constituency
Candidate	Party	Votes	%
Aleksandr Belousov (incumbent)	People's Party	67,844	32.37%
Sergey Orlov	Communist Party	28,520	13.61%
Irina Skupova	Yabloko	21,983	10.49%
Mikhail Matveyev	Independent	14,078	6.72%
Vladimir Sherstnev	Rodina	12,899	6.15%
Vladislav Loskutov	Independent	9,136	4.36%
Pyotr Yershov	Liberal Democratic Party	9,041	4.31%
Aleksandr Martynov	Party of Russia's Rebirth-Russian Party of Life	3,883	1.85%
Anatoly Morozenko	Independent	1,437	0.69%
Yevgeny Yezhov	Independent	1,353	0.65%
Nikolay Prokhodtsev	United Russian Party Rus'	1,160	0.55%
Nikolay Pereyaslov	Great Russia–Eurasian Union	991	0.47%
against all		34,277	16.35%
Total		210,237	100%

=== 2016 ===
Summary of the 18 September 2016 Russian legislative election in the Samara constituency
Candidate	Party	Votes	%
Nadezhda Kolesnikova	United Russia	109,435	45.03%
Mikhail Matveyev	Communist Party	49,984	20.57%
Oksana Lantsova	Liberal Democratic Party	24,104	9.92%
Vadim Baykov	Communists of Russia	11,781	4.85%
Pyotr Zolotarev	A Just Russia	11,432	4.70%
Sergey Sovetkin	Yabloko	6,126	2.52%
Yekaterina Gerasimova	People's Freedom Party	5,843	2.40%
Pyotr Vasilyev	Party of Growth	4,488	1.85%
Vladimir Dovbysh	The Greens	4,096	1.68%
Oleg Sabantsev	Patriots of Russia	2,642	1.09%
Aleksey Ofitserov	Civic Platform	2,610	1.07%
Total		243,031	100%

=== 2018 ===
Summary of the 9 September 2018 by-election in the Samara constituency
Candidate	Party	Votes	%
Aleksandr Khinshtein	United Russia	117,726	56.98%
Mikhail Abdalkin	Communist Party	29,868	14.46%
Vadim Baykov	Communists of Russia	15,288	7.40%
Roman Sinelnikov	Liberal Democratic Party	13,318	6.45%
Aleksandr Gusev	A Just Russia	12,478	6.04%
Igor Yermolenko	Yabloko	6,758	3.27%
Total		206,602	100%

=== 2021 ===
Summary of the 17-19 September 2021 Russian legislative election in the Samara constituency
Candidate	Party	Votes	%
Aleksandr Khinshtein (incumbent)	United Russia	115,721	51.12%
Mikhail Abdalkin	Communist Party	47,695	21.07%
Aleksey Mitrofanov	A Just Russia — For Truth	12,989	5.74%
Maria Bolshakova	Communists of Russia	11,338	5.01%
Aleksey Neudakhin	New People	10,894	4.81%
Andrey Sedogin	Liberal Democratic Party	9,646	4.26%
Yevgeny Lartsev	Party of Freedom and Justice	5,713	2.52%
Aleksandr Shatilov	Yabloko	4,277	1.89%
Total		226,365	100%

=== 2026 ===
Summary of the 18-20 September 2026 Russian legislative election in the Samara constituency
Candidate	Party	Votes	%
Aleksandr Fetisov	United Russia	151,948	56.15%
Aleksey Leskin	Communist Party	42,448	15.68%
Aleksey Tomchuk	New People	24,740	9.14%
Aleksandr Stepanov	Liberal Democratic Party	17,070	6.31%
Aleksey Selivanov	A Just Russia	10,063	3.72%
Yevgeny Diyanchuk	Party of Pensioners	8,193	3.03%
Aleksandr Mikulov	Communists of Russia	7,294	2.70%
Total		270,632	100%
