= Administrative divisions of Samara =

Samara is the administrative center of Samara Oblast. The city has been divided into nine city districts since an administrative reform in 1978.

As part of Samara Oblast Administration, the city of Samara is the city of regional significance.

== List of districts ==
District	Population (2019 estimate)	Area (km²)	Area (sq miles)	Density (in km²)	Density (in sq miles)	Notes
Kuybyshevsky	154,078	78	30.11	1,975	762	It is located in the southern part of the city on the left bank of the Samara River.
Samarasky	68,946					It forms the part of western historical portion of the city.
Leninsky	84,834	5.4	2.08	15,710	6,065	It is the financial and culture center of the city.
Zheleznodorozhny	152,749	19.6	7.5	7,793	3,008	The district is famous for Samara Railway Station.
Oktyabrsky	177,856	16.1	6.21	11,046	4,264	The district is one of the highly developed areas of the city.
Sovetsky	241,534	48.5	18.7	4,980	1,922	The district has city's large enterprises, educational and medical institutions and parks and squares. Formerly it is known as Molotovsky District.
Promyshlenny	373,867	50.5	19.4	7,403	2,858	It is the mostly densely district in the city.
Kirovsky	357,682	87.5	33.7	4,087	1,577	The district is one of the largest in Samara, possessing powerful economic, scientific and potential, creative achievements and traditions.
Krasnoglinsky	134,690	147	56.7	916	353	The district is known for its natural resources importance.
