= Perevoloki =

Perevoloki (Russian: Переволоки) is the name of several rural localities in Russia:

- Perevoloki, Bezenchuksky District, Samara Oblast, a selo in Bezenchuksky District of Samara Oblast
- Perevoloki, Syzransky District, Samara Oblast, a selo in Syzransky District of Samara Oblast
- Perevoloki, Tula Oblast, a village in Selivanovskaya Rural Administration of Shchyokinsky District of Tula Oblast
