= Mezhdurechensk Urban Settlement =

Mezhdurechensk Urban Settlement is the name of several municipal formations in Russia.

- Mezhdurechensk Urban Settlement, a municipal formation which Mezhdurechensk Urban-Type Settlement Administrative Territory in Udorsky District of the Komi Republic is incorporated as
- Mezhdurechensk Urban Settlement, a municipal formation which the urban-type settlement of Mezhdurechensk and the selo of Perevoloki in Syzransky District of Samara Oblast are incorporated as

== See also ==
- Mezhdurechensky Urban Settlement, a municipal formation which the urban-type settlement of Mezhdurechensky in Kondinsky District of Khanty-Mansi Autonomous Okrug is incorporated as
