= Kinelsky =

Kinelsky (masculine), Kinelskaya (feminine), or Kinelskoye (neuter) may refer to:

- Kinelsky District, a district of Samara Oblast, Russia
- Kinelsky (rural locality) (Kinelskaya, Kinelskoye), name of several rural localities in Russia
