= Kinel railway station =

Railway station in Samara Oblast, Russia

Kinel Кинель
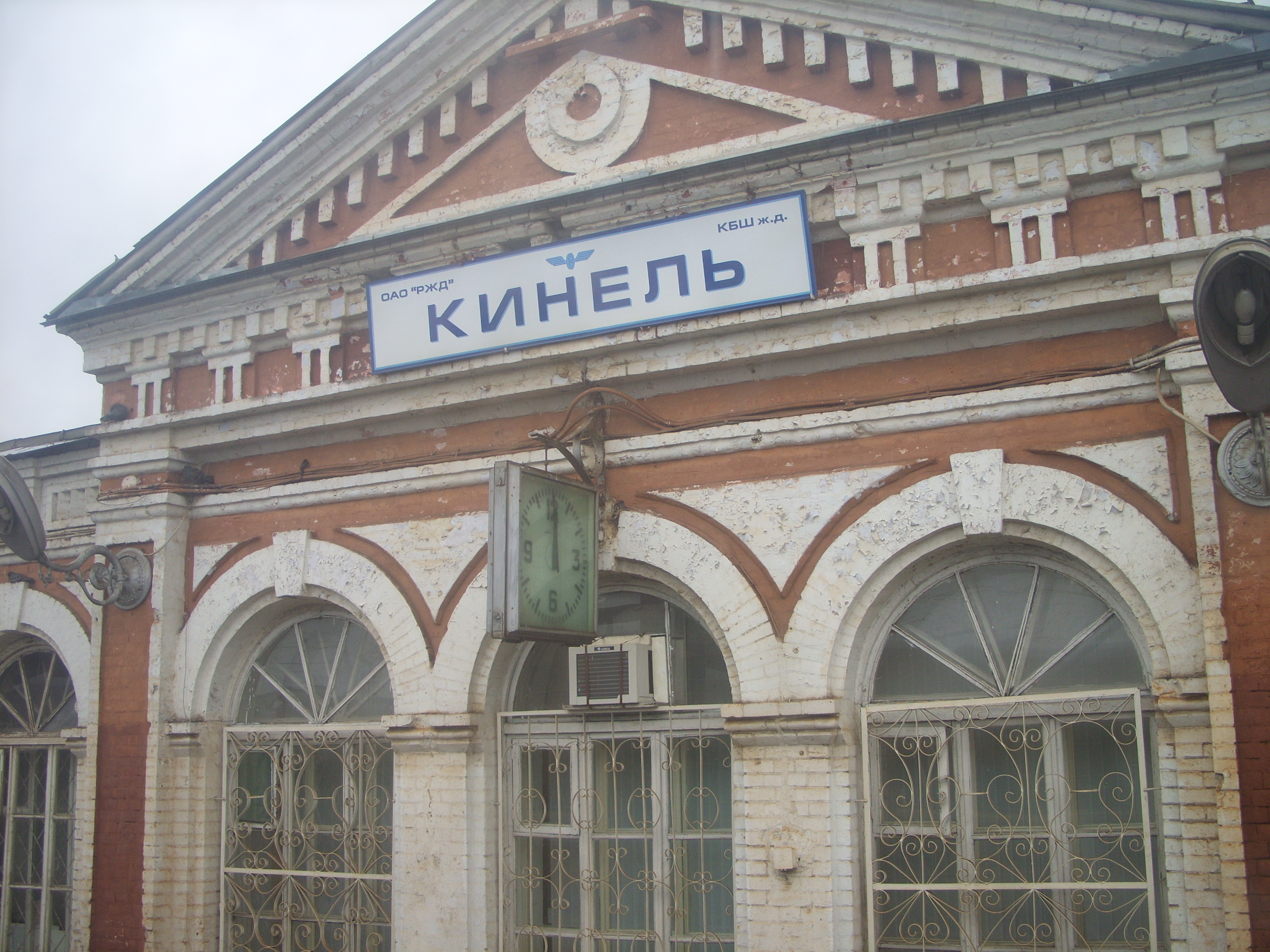
- View of the station

General information
- Location: 50А, Oktyabrskaya Str, Kinel, Samara Oblast Russia
- Coordinates: 53.230658°N 50.633303°E
- Platforms: 1
- Tracks: 40

Construction
- Parking: yes

Other information
- Station code: 657305

History
- Opened: 1877
- Former names: Charykovskaya
Location

Kinel railway station (Russian: станция Кинель) is a major mainline railway station located in Kinel, Samara Oblast, Russia. It is a junction of Kuybyshev Railway, 40 km from Samara railway station. The station combines four routes out of Kinel. It is an important junction, where the Samara — Orenburg main line, and the railway lines to Ufa, Tolyatti and Bezenchuk diverge. It is located in the town center.

== History ==
Kinel railway station was built in 1876 with the construction of Batraki (now Oktyabrsk) — Orenburg railway with the length of 507 versts (540.4 km). Kinel station was laid at 155 versts of the line. A branch from Kinel to Ufa was planned initially. The station was named Charykovskaya, after the landowner V. Charykov, on whose lands new station was under construction. Construction began in May 1874. The first train from Orenburg arrived to Kinel in October 1876 and from Syzran in January 1977. The station consist four tracks, several spur tracks, two low platforms, small wooden station building, repair shops and water tower. After Charykov's death, his son declared unethical use of noble family names in public places, and the station was renamed Kinel.

The construction of the Samara — Zlatoust via Ufa railway was begun in 1885. Kinel station becomes a railway junction. The second track was built between Samara and Kinel. Smyshlyaevka-Kinel section of the line was paved on a new road in the valley of the Samara River because of snow drifts. In the same period a retarder classification yard was built at the station. A roundhouse for six steam locomotives was erected near the railway yard. The current brick station building was constructed in 1888. The station was badly damaged in the fire in 1911. A lot of station houses were destroyed by fire.

During the Second World War Kinel was an important transit hub. Troop trains proceeded in state through the station. Kinel station was electrified DC with electrification of the Kuibyshev (now Samara) — Kinel — Krotovka section in 1956-58 and equipped with automatic train protection in 1959. Fully mechanized marshalling yard hump was equipped with automatic switching and rail car retarders.

In 2013, the relay automatic switching was replaced by a microprocessor. Additional tracks have been built in the departure yard No. 7, the recentering yard No. 8 and the transit yard. A microprocessor train protection system and energy-saving lighting system was introduced at the station.

== Services ==
Kinel station has a locomotive depot which exploit electric locomotives 2ES6 Sinara and VL10. The station is operated by Russian Railways. Kinel is the terminal for long-distance and suburban trains operated by the Federal Passenger Company and Samara Suburban Passenger Company. The most common destinations are: Novosibirsk, Ufa, Chelyabinsk, Adler, Anapa, Astrakhan, Saratov, Irkutsk. The average stopping times of passenger trains are of about 3 minutes. The station hosts suburban trains only from Samara, Bezenchuk and Pokhvistnevo.

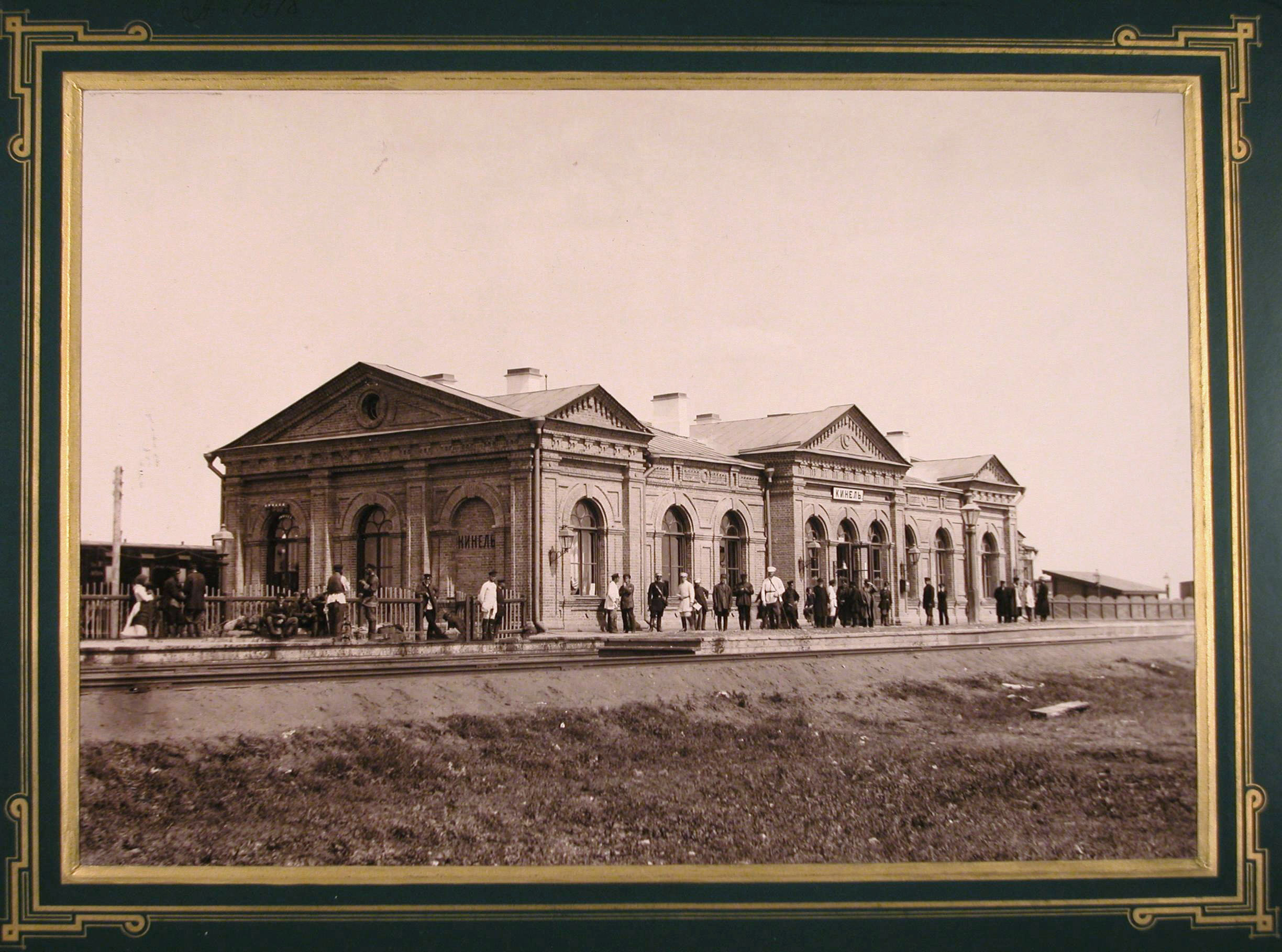
Kinel station in the 1900s

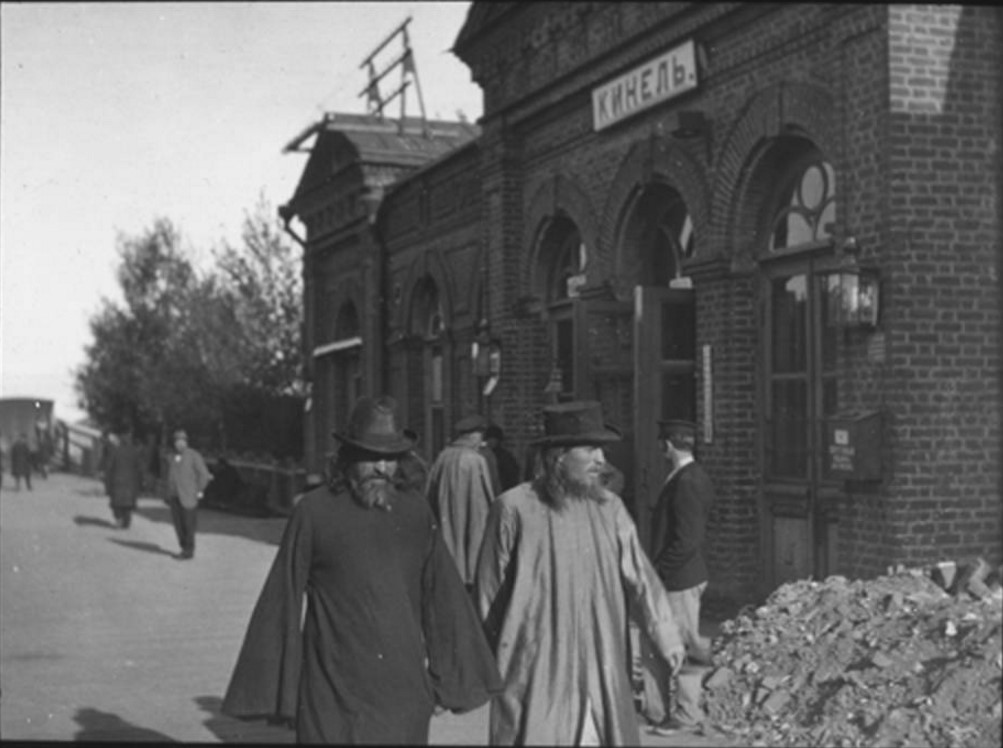
View of the station from the street in the 1900s
