= Bezenchuk (disambiguation) =

Bezenchuk is an urban locality in Bezenchuksky District of Samara Oblast, Russia.

Bezenchuk may also refer to:

- Bezenchuk River, river in Russia, left tributary of Volga
- Coffin-maker Bezenchuk, fictional character from the novel The Twelve Chairs and derived works
