= Dmitri Teterin =

Russian footballer

Personal information
- Full name: Dmitri Andreyevich Teterin
- Date of birth: 31 August 1979 (age 47)
- Place of birth: Kinel, Russian SFSR
- Height: 1.80 m (5 ft 11 in)
- Position: Midfielder

Youth career
- DYuSSh-11 Voskhod Samara
- FC Metall Samara

Senior career*
Years	Team	Apps	(Gls)
1996–1997	FC Lokomotiv Moscow	0	(0)
1996	→ FC Lokomotiv-d Moscow	21	(0)
1997	FC Lokomotiv Kinel		
1998	FC Lada-Togliatti-VAZ Togliatti	39	(13)
1999–2000	FC Krylia Sovetov Samara	39	(6)
2000	→ FC Krylia Sovetov-2 Samara (loan)	5	(0)
2001	FC Uralan Elista	30	(0)
2002	FC Kuban Krasnodar	20	(0)
2003	FC Lada Togliatti	16	(2)
2004	FC Lisma-Mordovia Saransk	19	(3)
2004	FC Nosta Novotroitsk	12	(0)
2005–2006	FC Voskhod Samara		
2008	FC Metall Samara		
- * Club domestic league appearances and goals

Dmitri Andreyevich Teterin (Russian: Дмитрий Андреевич Тетерин; born 31 August 1979) is a former Russian football player.
