= Otradny, Samara Oblast =

Town in Samara Oblast, Russia

Otradny Отрадный
- Town
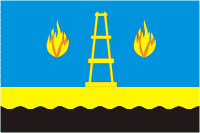
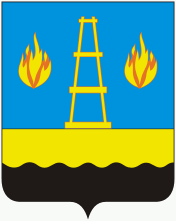
- Flag Coat of arms
- Interactive map of Otradny
- Location of Otradny Otradny (Samara Oblast)
- Coordinates: 53°22′N 51°21′E
- Country: Russia
- Federal subject: Samara Oblast
- Founded: 1920
- Town status since: 1956
- Elevation: 55 m (180 ft)

Population (2010 Census)
  - Total: 48,356
  - Estimate (2025): 46,123 (−4.6%)
  - Rank: 329th in 2010

Administrative status
  - Subordinated to: town of oblast significance of Otradny
  - Capital of: town of oblast significance of Otradny

Municipal status
  - Urban okrug: Otradny Urban Okrug
  - Capital of: Otradny Urban Okrug
- Time zone: UTC+4 (MSK+1)
- Postal code: 446300
- OKTMO ID: 36724000001

Otradny (Russian: Отра́дный) is a town in Samara Oblast, Russia, located on the left bank of the Bolshoy Kinel River (Samara's tributary), 91 kilometers (57 mi) east of Samara. Population: 48,356 (2010 census); 50,048 (2002 census); 48,767 (1989 Soviet census).

== History ==
The settlement of Otradnoye (Отра́дное) was founded in the beginning of the 1920s by the peasants of the village of Chernovka. In 1946, an oil-extracting settlement of Mukhanovo (Муханово) was established nearby, and in 1947 it was granted urban-type settlement status and renamed Otradny. It grew and absorbed the settlement of Otradnoye, and in 1956 it was granted town status.

== Administrative and municipal status ==
Within the framework of administrative divisions, it is incorporated as the town of oblast significance of Otradny—an administrative unit with the status equal to that of the districts. As a municipal division, the town of oblast significance of Otradny is incorporated as Otradny Urban Okrug.

== Sister city ==
- Bačka Palanka, Serbia
