= Andrei Alekseyev =

Russian footballer

Personal information
- Full name: Andrei Alekseyevich Alekseyev
- Date of birth: 6 May 1997 (age 29)
- Place of birth: Syzran, Russia
- Height: 1.82 m (6 ft 0 in)
- Position: Defender

Youth career
- Chertanovo Education Center

Senior career*
Years	Team	Apps	(Gls)
2014–2017	FC Chertanovo Moscow	57	(3)
2018	FC Torpedo Moscow	1	(0)
2018	FC Volgar Astrakhan	14	(0)
2019	FC Urozhay Krasnodar	6	(0)
2019–2020	FC Kafa Feodosia	10	(0)
2020–2021	FC Chertanovo Moscow	20	(1)
2021–2022	FC Olimp-Dolgoprudny	12	(0)
2022–2023	FC Metallurg Lipetsk	31	(3)
2023–2024	FC SKA Rostov-on-Don	11	(0)

International career
2013	Russia U-16	3	(0)
2014	Russia U-17	3	(1)
2014	Russia U-18	1	(0)
- * Club domestic league appearances and goals

Andrei Alekseyevich Alekseyev (Russian: Андрей Алексеевич Алексеев; born 6 May 1997) is a Russian former football player.

== Club career ==
He made his debut in the Russian Football National League for FC Chertanovo Moscow on 9 October 2020 in a game against FC Krasnodar-2.
