= Volzhsky, Samara Oblast =

Volzhsky Волжский
- Urban-type settlement
- Interactive map of Volzhsky
- Location of Volzhsky Volzhsky (Samara Oblast)
- Coordinates: 53.4303°N 50.1251°E
- Country: Russia
- Federal subject: Samara Oblast
- Administrative district: Krasnoyarsky District
- Founded: 1703

Population (2010 Census)
  - Total: 6,968
  - Estimate (2021): 7,727 (+10.9%)
- Time zone: UTC+4 (MSK+1)
- Postal code: 446394
- OKTMO ID: 36628155051

Volzhsky (Russian: Волжский) is an urban locality (an urban-type settlement) in Krasnoyarsky District of Samara Oblast, Russia. Population: 6,968 (2010 census); 7,095 (2002 census); 4,644 (1989 Soviet census).
