= Ust-Kinelsky =

Ust-Kinelsky Усть-Кинельский
- Work settlement
- Interactive map of Ust-Kinelsky
- Location of Ust-Kinelsky Ust-Kinelsky (Samara Oblast)
- Coordinates: 53°16′04″N 50°34′44″E
- Country: Russia
- Federal subject: Samara Oblast

Population (2010 Census)
  - Total: 9,988
  - Estimate (2021): 10,547 (+5.6%)

Administrative status
  - Subordinated to: town of oblast significance of Kinel

Municipal status
  - Urban okrug: Kinel Urban Okrug
- Time zone: UTC+4 (MSK+1)
- Postal code: 446442
- OKTMO ID: 36708000061

Ust-Kinelsky (Russian: Усть-Кинельский) is an urban locality (urban-type settlement) under the administrative jurisdiction of the town of oblast significance of Kinel of Samara Oblast, Russia. Population: 9,988 (2010 census); 8,995 (2002 census); 7,257 (1989 Soviet census).
