= Sergiyevsk =

Rural locality in Samara Oblast, Russia

Coordinates: 53°56′42″N 51°10′16″E

Sergiyevsk (Russian: Сергиевск) is a rural locality (a selo) and the administrative center of Sergiyevsky District, Samara Oblast, Russia. Population: 8,661 (2010 census); 8,282 (2002 census); 8,367 (1989 Soviet census).
