= Bolshoy Kinel =

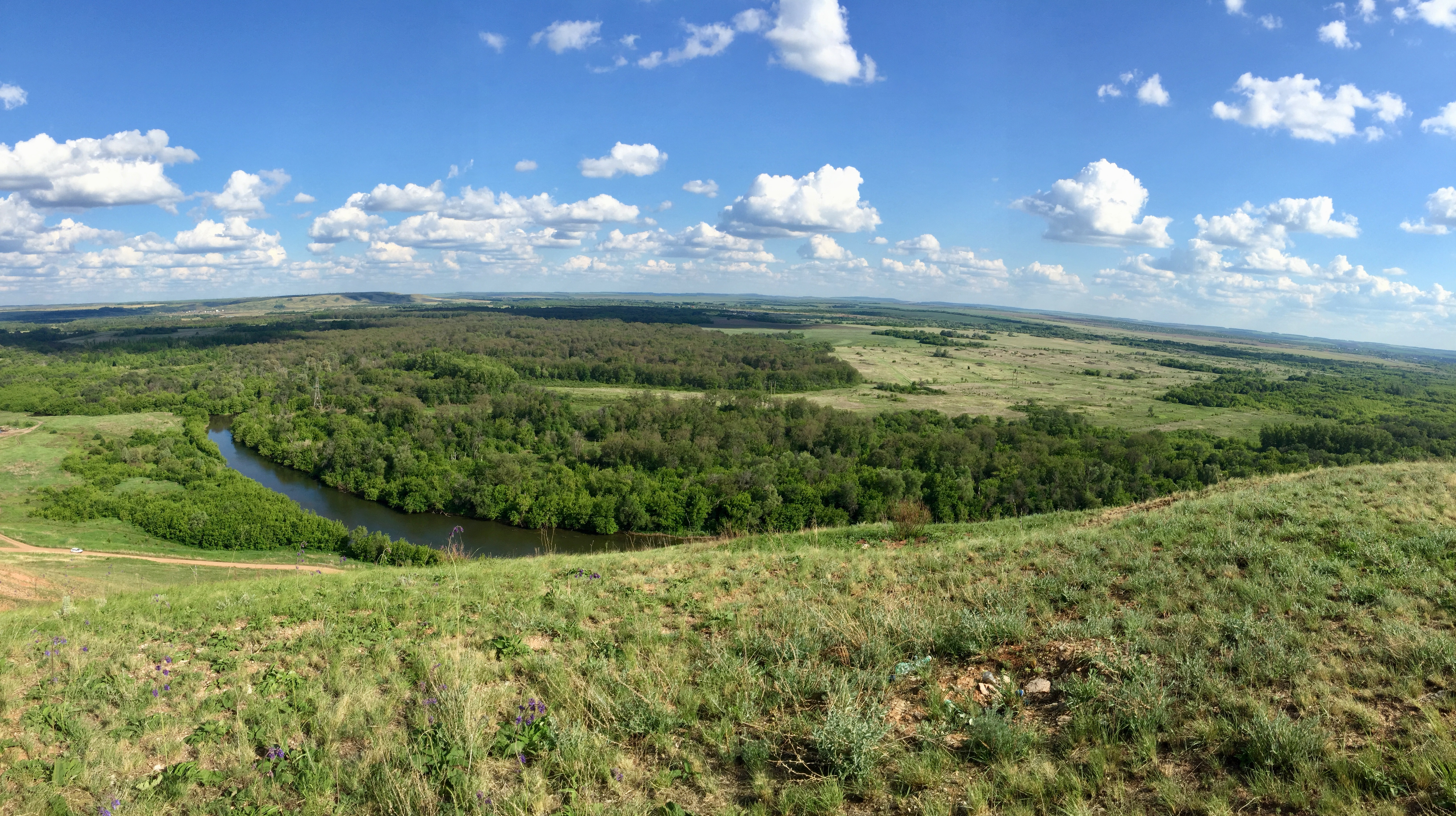

Location
- Country: Russia

Physical characteristics
- Mouth: Samara
  - coordinates: 53.2392°N 50.5365°E
- Length: 422 km (262 mi)
- Basin size: 14,900 km^{2} (5,800 sq mi)

Basin features
- Progression: Samara→ Volga→ Caspian Sea

The Bolshoy Kinel (Russian: Большо́й Кине́ль) is a river in Orenburg and Samara Oblasts of Russia. It is a right tributary of the river Samara, and is 422 kilometers (262 mi) long, with a drainage basin of 14,900 square kilometers (5,800 sq mi). It has its sources on the northern slopes of the Obshchy Syrt hills, and flows into the Samara 15 kilometers (9 mi) east of the city of Samara.

Along the river are located the towns of Buguruslan, Pokhvistnevo, Otradny and, at the confluence with the Samara, Kinel.
