= Balasheyka =

Balasheyka Балашейка
- Urban-type settlement
- Interactive map of Balasheyka
- Location of Balasheyka Balasheyka (Samara Oblast)
- Coordinates: 53.2831°N 48.0844°E
- Country: Russia
- Federal subject: Samara Oblast
- Administrative district: Syzransky District
- Elevation: 169 m (554 ft)

Population (2010 Census)
  - Total: 2,930
  - Estimate (2021): 2,614 (−10.8%)
- Time zone: UTC+4 (MSK+1)
- Postal code: 446060
- OKTMO ID: 36642154051

Balasheyka (Russian: Балашейка) is an urban locality (an urban-type settlement) in Syzransky District of Samara Oblast, Russia. Population: 2,930 (2010 census); 3,104 (2002 census);
