= Osinki, Samara Oblast =

Osinki Осинки
- Urban-type settlement
- Interactive map of Osinki
- Location of Osinki Osinki (Samara Oblast)
- Coordinates: 52.8470°N 49.5093°E
- Country: Russia
- Federal subject: Samara Oblast
- Administrative district: Bezenchuksky District

Population (2010 Census)
  - Total: 3,101
  - Estimate (2021): 2,858 (−7.8%)
- Time zone: UTC+4 (MSK+1)
- Postal code: 446237
- OKTMO ID: 36604157051

Osinki (Russian: Осинки) is an urban locality (an urban-type settlement) in Bezenchuksky District of Samara Oblast, Russia. Population: 3,101 (2010 census); 3,127 (2002 census); 3,094 (1989 Soviet census).
