= Sukhodol, Samara Oblast =

Sukhodol Суходол
- Urban-type settlement
- Interactive map of Sukhodol
- Location of Sukhodol Sukhodol (Samara Oblast)
- Coordinates: 53.9033°N 51.2182°E
- Country: Russia
- Federal subject: Samara Oblast
- Administrative district: Sergiyevsky District

Population (2010 Census)
  - Total: 13,413
  - Estimate (2021): 13,348 (−0.5%)
- Time zone: UTC+4 (MSK+1)
- Postal codes: 446552, 446553
- OKTMO ID: 36638158051

Sukhodol (Russian: Суходол) is an urban locality (an urban-type settlement) in Sergiyevsky District of Samara Oblast, Russia. Population: 13,413 (2010 census); 14,407 (2002 census); 12,253 (1989 Soviet census).
