= Mirny, Samara Oblast =

Mirny Мирный
- Urban-type settlement
- Coat of arms
- Interactive map of Mirny
- Location of Mirny Mirny (Samara Oblast)
- Coordinates: 53.5087°N 50.2728°E
- Country: Russia
- Federal subject: Samara Oblast
- Administrative district: Krasnoyarsky District
- Founded: 1956
- Elevation: 50 m (160 ft)

Population (2010 Census)
  - Total: 7,343
  - Estimate (2021): 7,246 (−1.3%)
- Time zone: UTC+4 (MSK+1)
- Postal code: 446377
- OKTMO ID: 36628158051

Mirny (Russian: Мирный) is an urban locality (an urban-type settlement) in Krasnoyarsky District of Samara Oblast, Russia. Population: 7,343 (2010 census); 7,451 (2002 census); 7,214 (1989 Soviet census).
