= Kinelsky (rural locality) =

Kinelsky (Russian: Кинельский; masculine), Kinelskaya (Кинельская; feminine), or Kinelskoye (Кинельское; neuter) is the name of several rural localities in Russia:

- Kinelsky, Orenburg Oblast, a settlement in Kinelsky Selsoviet of Matveyevsky District of Orenburg Oblast
- Kinelsky, Samara Oblast, a settlement in Kinelsky District of Samara Oblast
