= Alexeyevka, Kinel, Samara Oblast =

Alexeyevka Алексеевка
- Work settlement
- Interactive map of Alexeyevka
- Location of Alexeyevka Alexeyevka (Samara Oblast)
- Coordinates: 53°15′04″N 50°29′15″E
- Country: Russia
- Federal subject: Samara Oblast
- Founded: 1700

Population (2010 Census)
  - Total: 10,411
  - Estimate (2021): 10,877 (+4.5%)

Administrative status
  - Subordinated to: town of oblast significance of Kinel

Municipal status
  - Urban okrug: Kinel Urban Okrug
- Time zone: UTC+4 (MSK+1)
- Postal code: 446441
- OKTMO ID: 36708000056

Alexeyevka (Russian: Алексеевка) is an urban locality (urban-type settlement) under the administrative jurisdiction of the town of oblast significance of Kinel of Samara Oblast, Russia. Population: 10,411 (2010 census); 9,703 (2002 census); 9,179 (1989 Soviet census).
