= Krasny Yar, Krasnoyarsky District, Samara Oblast =

Rural locality in Samara Oblast, Russia

Coordinates: 53°29′47″N 50°23′20″E

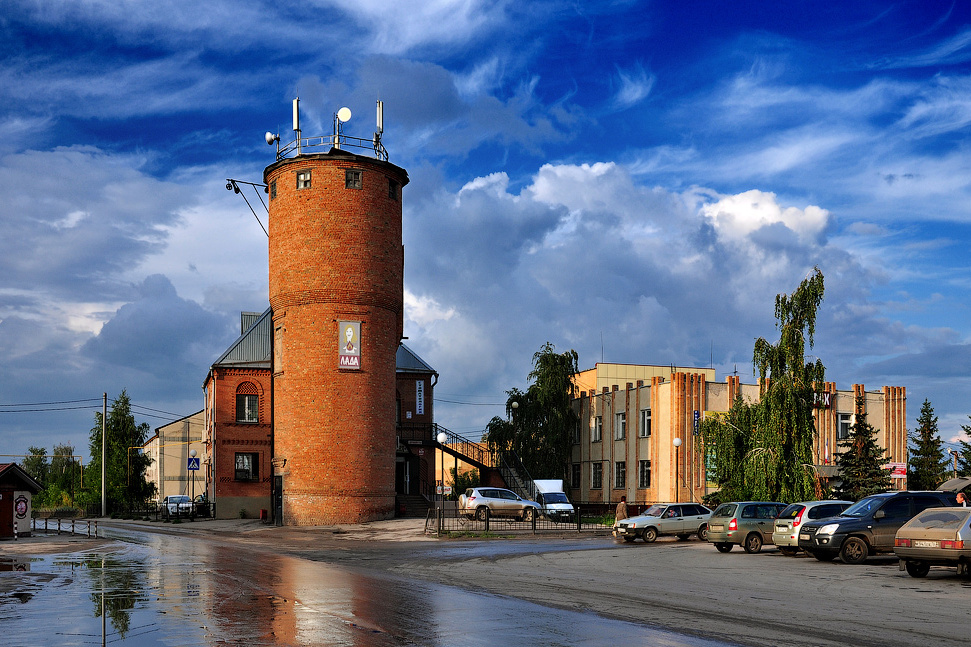
Street of Krasnyy-yar

Krasny Yar (Russian: Красный Яр) is a rural locality (a selo) and the administrative center of Krasnoyarsky District, Samara Oblast, Russia. Population: 7,958 (2010 census); 7,724 (2002 census); 7,056 (1989 Soviet census).
