= Syzran Kremlin =

Tower in Syzran, Samara Oblast, Russia

Coordinates: 53.1469°N 48.4543°E

- Syzran, Russian Federation
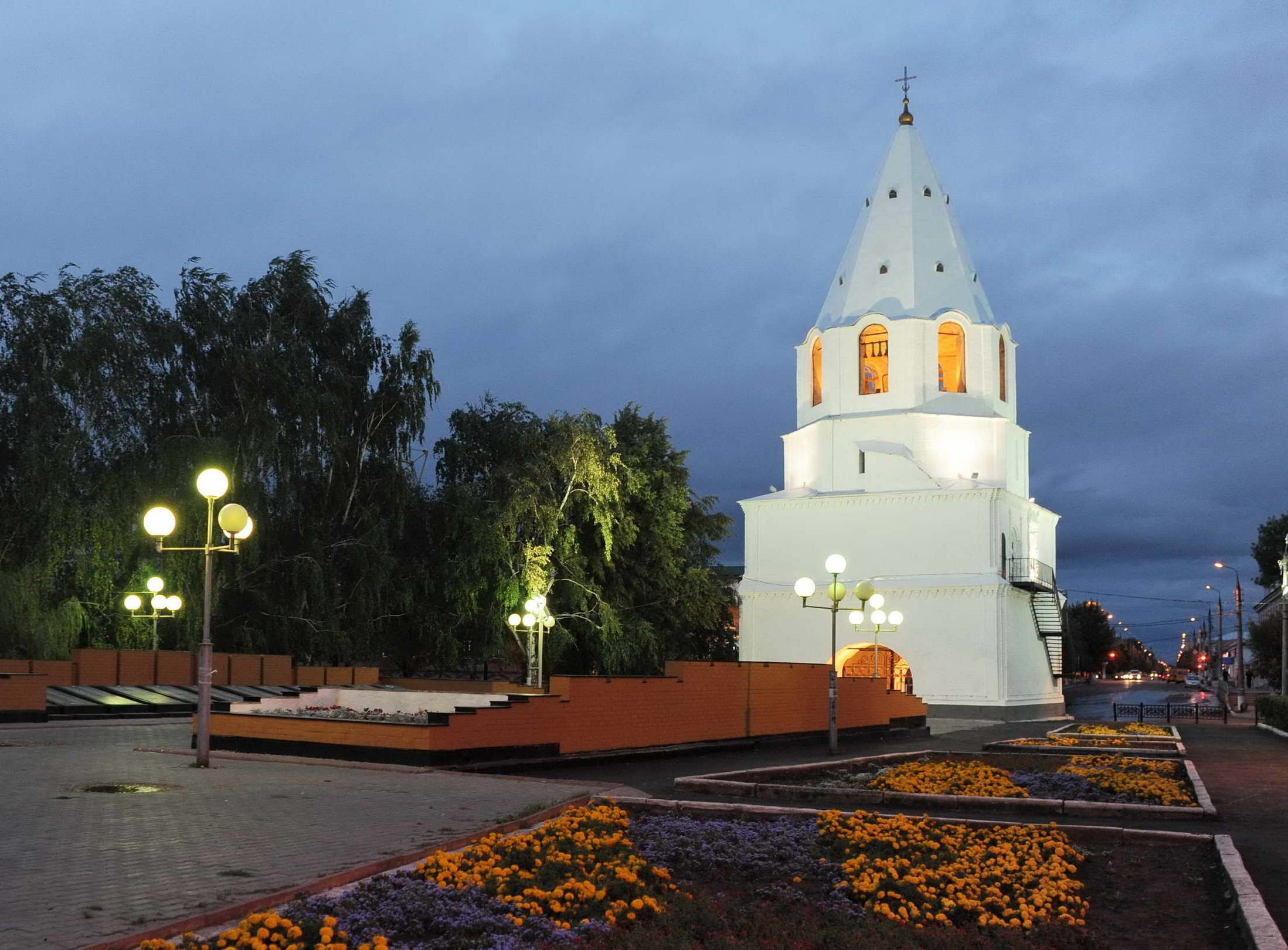
- Spasskaya Tower. Spasskaya tower Syzran Kremlin

Site information
- Type: Kremlin
- Open to the public: Yes
- Condition: Ruined, (one tower)

Location
- Height: 27 meters

Site history
- Built: 1683
- Built by: Governor G. Kozlowski
- In use: 1
- Materials: Wood, stone
- Demolished: Four towers
- Battles/wars: 1

The Syzran Kremlin (Russian: Сызранский Кремль) is located in Syzran, Samara Oblast, Russia, on the Kremlin hill at the confluence of the Volga, Syzranka, and Krymza rivers.

The Syzran Kremlin is the only kremlin in Samara Oblast; only Spasskaya Tower survives. The Kremlin also houses the Church of the Nativity (1717).

In 1683 construction began on the fortress of Tsar Peter the Great I, construction under the supervision od Governor G. Kozlowski. Spasskya Tower was first portal, but then its redesigned and built inside the church in the name of the Savior. Participated in the fighting just once. Currently, Spasskaya Tower is a museum.
