= Sergiyevsky District =

Sergiyevsky District Сергиевский район (Russian)
- District
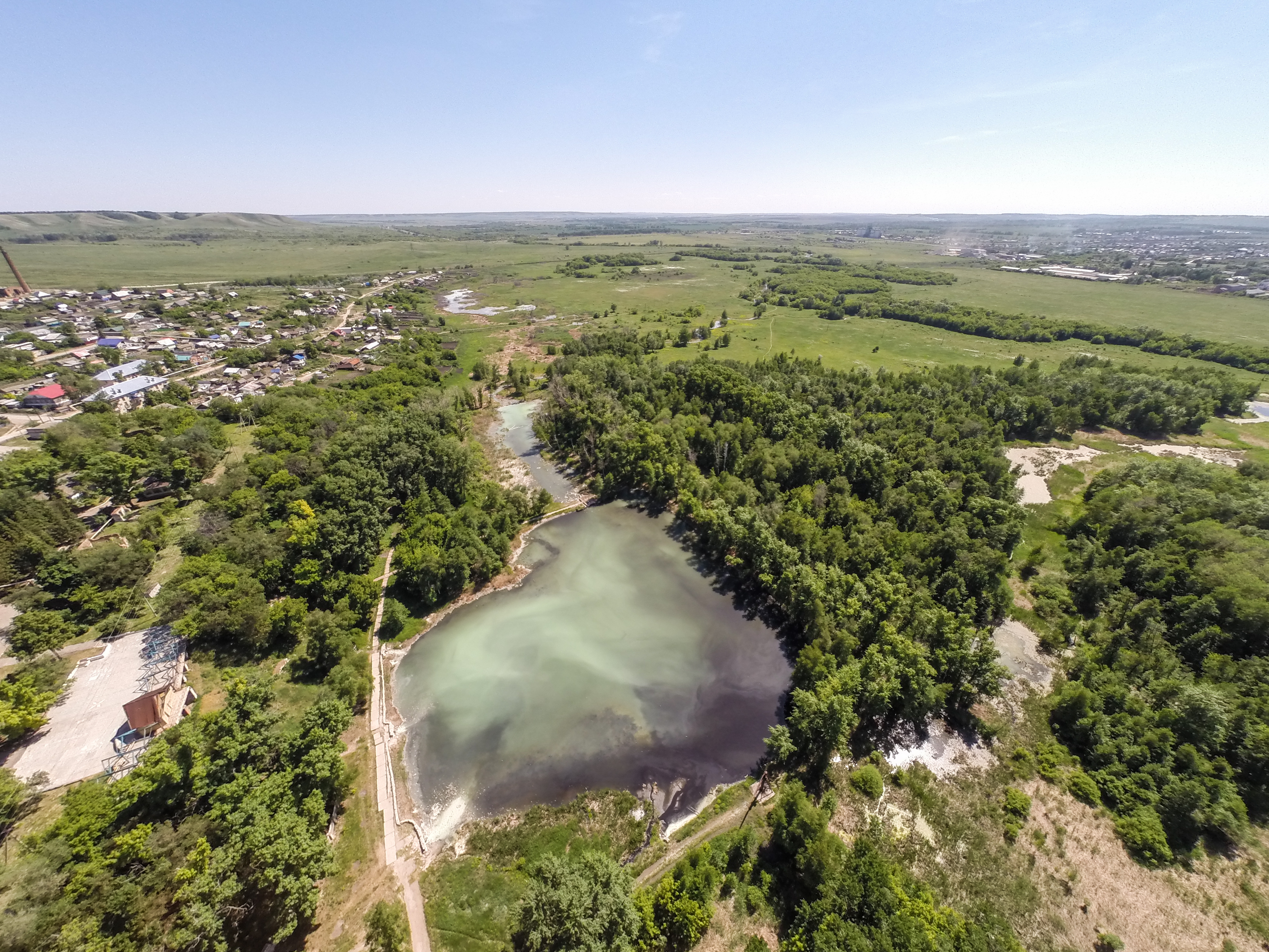
- Brimstone Lake, Sergiyevsky District

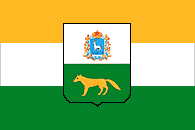
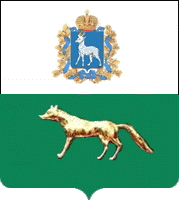
- Flag Coat of arms
- Location of Sergiyevsky District in Samara Oblast
- Coordinates: 53°50′N 51°20′E
- Country: Russia
- Federal subject: Samara Oblast
- Established: 16 July 1928
- Administrative center: Sergiyevsk

Area
  - Total: 2,720 km^{2} (1,050 sq mi)

Population (2010 Census)
  - Total: 47,548
  - Density: 17.5/km^{2} (45.3/sq mi)
  - Urban: 28.2%
  - Rural: 71.8%

Administrative structure
  - Inhabited localities: 1 urban-type settlements, 67 rural localities

Municipal structure
  - Municipally incorporated as: Sergiyevsky Municipal District
  - Municipal divisions: 1 urban settlements, 16 rural settlements
- Time zone: UTC+4 (MSK+1)
- OKTMO ID: 36638000
- Website: http://www.sergievsk.ru/

Sergiyevsky District (Russian: Се́ргиевский райо́н) is an administrative and municipal district (raion), one of the twenty-seven in Samara Oblast, Russia. It is located in the north of the oblast. The area of the district is 2,720 square kilometers (1,050 sq mi). Its administrative center is the rural locality (a selo) of Sergiyevsk. Population: 47,548 (2010 Census); 48,976 (2002 census); 48,574 (1989 Soviet census). The population of Sergiyevsk accounts for 18.2% of the district's total population.

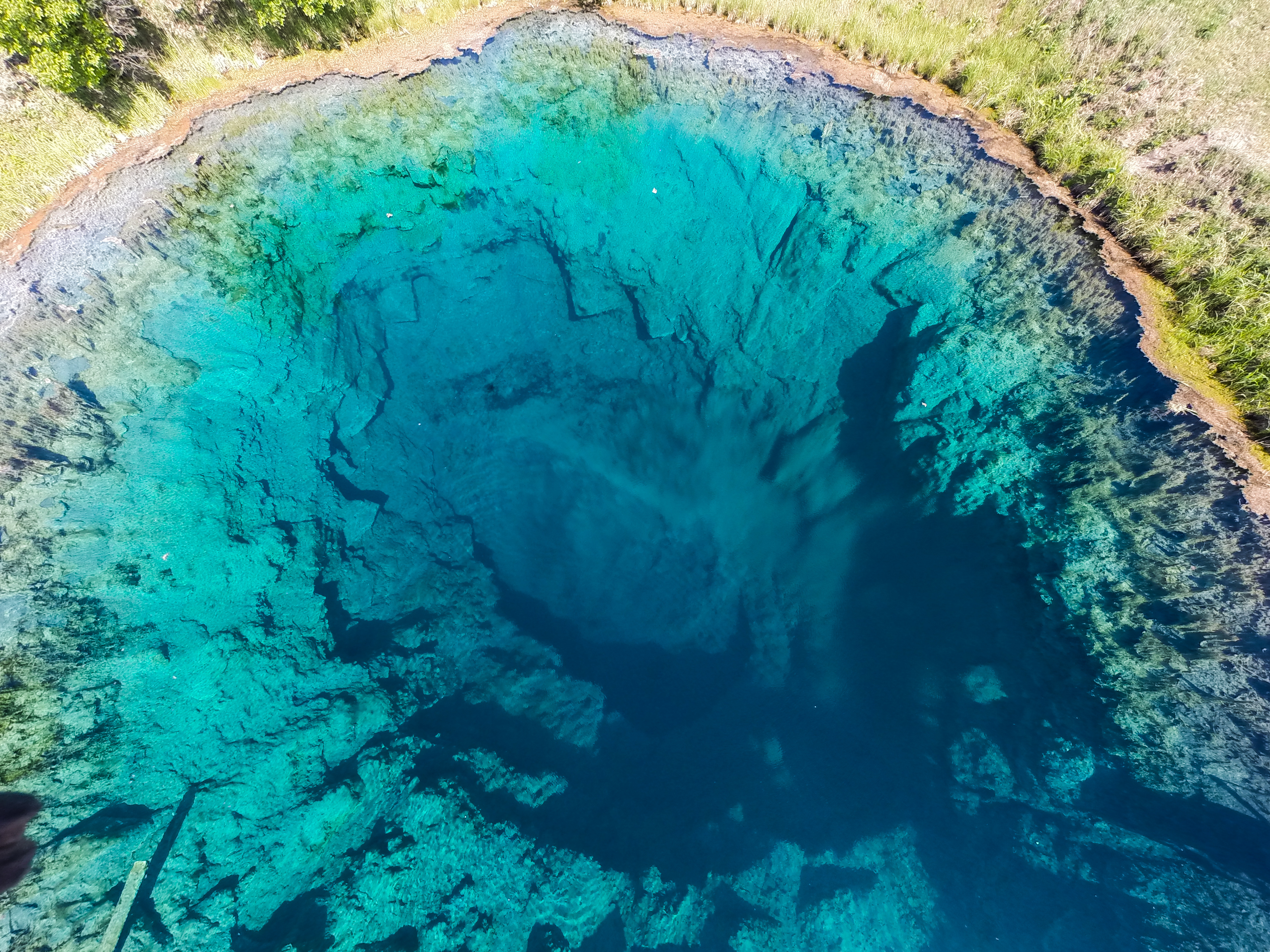
Blue Lake of the Samara Region
