= Stroykeramika =

Stroykeramika Стройкерамика
- Urban-type settlement
- Interactive map of Stroykeramika
- Location of Stroykeramika Stroykeramika (Samara Oblast)
- Coordinates: 53.2702°N 50.3983°E
- Country: Russia
- Federal subject: Samara Oblast
- Administrative district: Volzhsky District

Population (2010 Census)
  - Total: 7,322
  - Estimate (2021): 21,567 (+194.6%)
- Time zone: UTC+4 (MSK+1)
- Postal code: 443528
- OKTMO ID: 36614157056

Stroykeramika (Russian: Стройкерамика) is an urban locality (an urban-type settlement) in Volzhsky District of Samara Oblast, Russia. Population: 7,322 (2010 census); 7,425 (2002 census);
