= Neftegorsky District =

Neftegorsky District Нефтегорский район (Russian)
- District
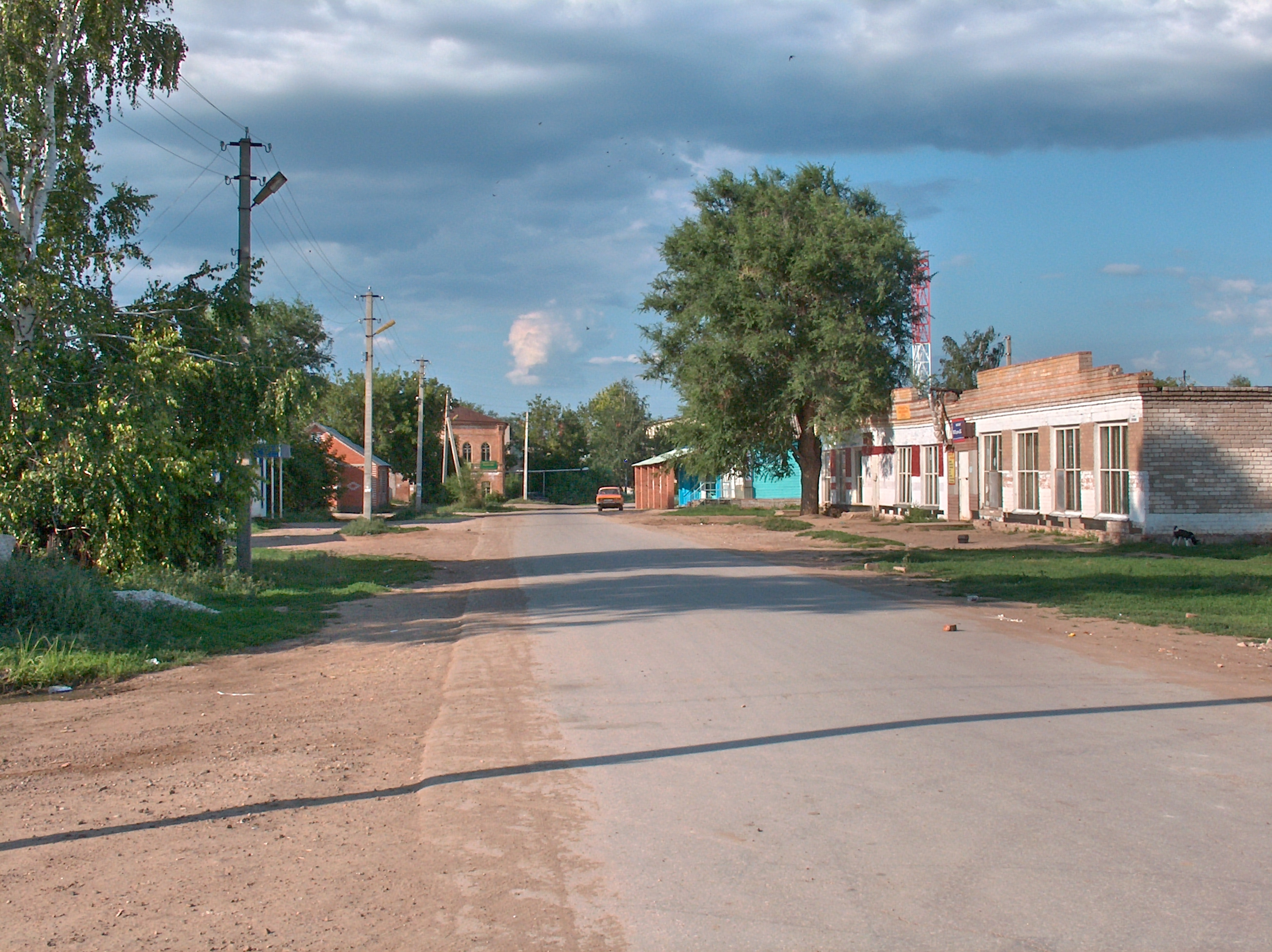
- Village (selo) Utevka, Neftegorsky District

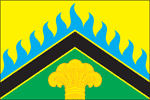
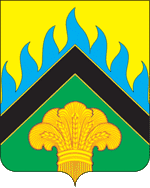
- Flag Coat of arms
- Location of Neftegorsky District in Samara Oblast
- Coordinates: 52°48′N 51°10′E
- Country: Russia
- Federal subject: Samara Oblast
- Established: 16 January 1965
- Administrative center: Neftegorsk

Area
  - Total: 1,350 km^{2} (520 sq mi)

Population (2010 Census)
  - Total: 34,478
  - Density: 25.5/km^{2} (66.1/sq mi)
  - Urban: 55.8%
  - Rural: 44.2%

Administrative structure
  - Inhabited localities: 1 cities/towns, 19 rural localities

Municipal structure
  - Municipally incorporated as: Neftegorsky Municipal District
  - Municipal divisions: 1 urban settlements, 8 rural settlements
- Time zone: UTC+4 (MSK+1)
- OKTMO ID: 36630000
- Website: http://neftegorskadm.ru/

Neftegorsky District (Russian: Нефтего́рский райо́н) is an administrative and municipal district (raion), one of the twenty-seven in Samara Oblast, Russia. It is located in the southeastern central part of the oblast. The area of the district is 1,350 square kilometers (520 sq mi). Its administrative center is the town of Neftegorsk. Population: 34,478 (2010 Census); 32,246 (2002 census); 31,406 (1989 Soviet census). The population of Neftegorsk accounts for 55.8% of the district's total population.
