= Neftegorsk, Samara Oblast =

Town in Samara Oblast, Russia

Neftegorsk Нефтегорск
- Town
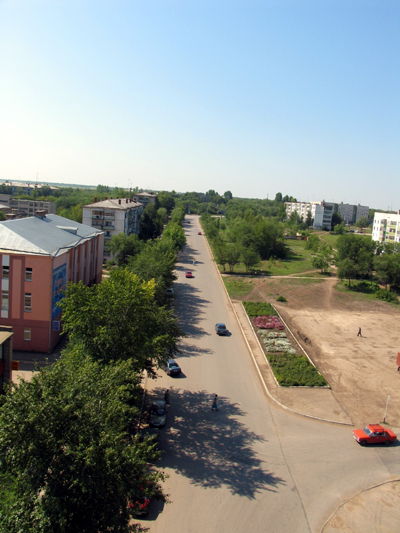
- View of Neftegorsk

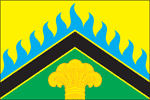
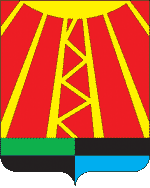
- Flag Coat of arms
- Interactive map of Neftegorsk
- Location of Neftegorsk Neftegorsk (Samara Oblast)
- Coordinates: 52°48′N 51°10′E
- Country: Russia
- Federal subject: Samara Oblast
- Administrative district: Neftegorsky District
- Founded: 1960
- Town status since: 1989
- Elevation: 90 m (300 ft)

Population (2010 Census)
  - Total: 19,254
  - Estimate (2025): 17,717 (−8%)

Administrative status
  - Capital of: Neftegorsky District

Municipal status
  - Municipal district: Neftegorsky Municipal District
  - Urban settlement: Neftegorsk Urban Settlement
  - Capital of: Neftegorsky Municipal District, Neftegorsk Urban Settlement
- Time zone: UTC+4 (MSK+1)
- Postal codes: 446600, 446619
- OKTMO ID: 36630101001
- Website: gpneftegorsk.ru

Neftegorsk (Russian: Нефтего́рск) is a town and the administrative center of Neftegorsky District in Samara Oblast, Russia, located 103 kilometers (64 mi) southeast of Samara, the administrative center of the oblast. Population: 19,254 (2010 census); 19,388 (2002 census); 18,895 (1989 Soviet census).

== History ==
It was founded in 1960 as an oil-extracting settlement. Urban-type settlement status was granted to it in 1966; town status was granted in 1989.

== Administrative and municipal status ==
Within the framework of administrative divisions, Neftegorsk serves as the administrative center of Neftegorsky District, to which it is directly subordinated. As a municipal division, the town of Neftegorsk is incorporated within Neftegorsky Municipal District as Neftegorsk Urban Settlement.
