= Mezhdurechensk, Samara Oblast =

Mezhdurechensk Междуреченск
- Urban-type settlement
- Interactive map of Mezhdurechensk
- Location of Mezhdurechensk Mezhdurechensk (Samara Oblast)
- Coordinates: 53.2702°N 49.1150°E
- Country: Russia
- Federal subject: Samara Oblast
- Administrative district: Syzransky District
- Founded: 1965

Population (2010 Census)
  - Total: 3,006
  - Estimate (2021): 2,726 (−9.3%)
- Time zone: UTC+4 (MSK+1)
- Postal code: 445250
- OKTMO ID: 36642156051

Mezhdurechensk (Russian: Междуреченск) is an urban locality (an urban-type settlement) in Syzransky District of Samara Oblast, Russia. Population: 3,006 (2010 census); 3,481 (2002 census); 4,132 (1989 Soviet census).
