= Syzran =

City in Samara Oblast, Russia

Syzran Сызрань
- City
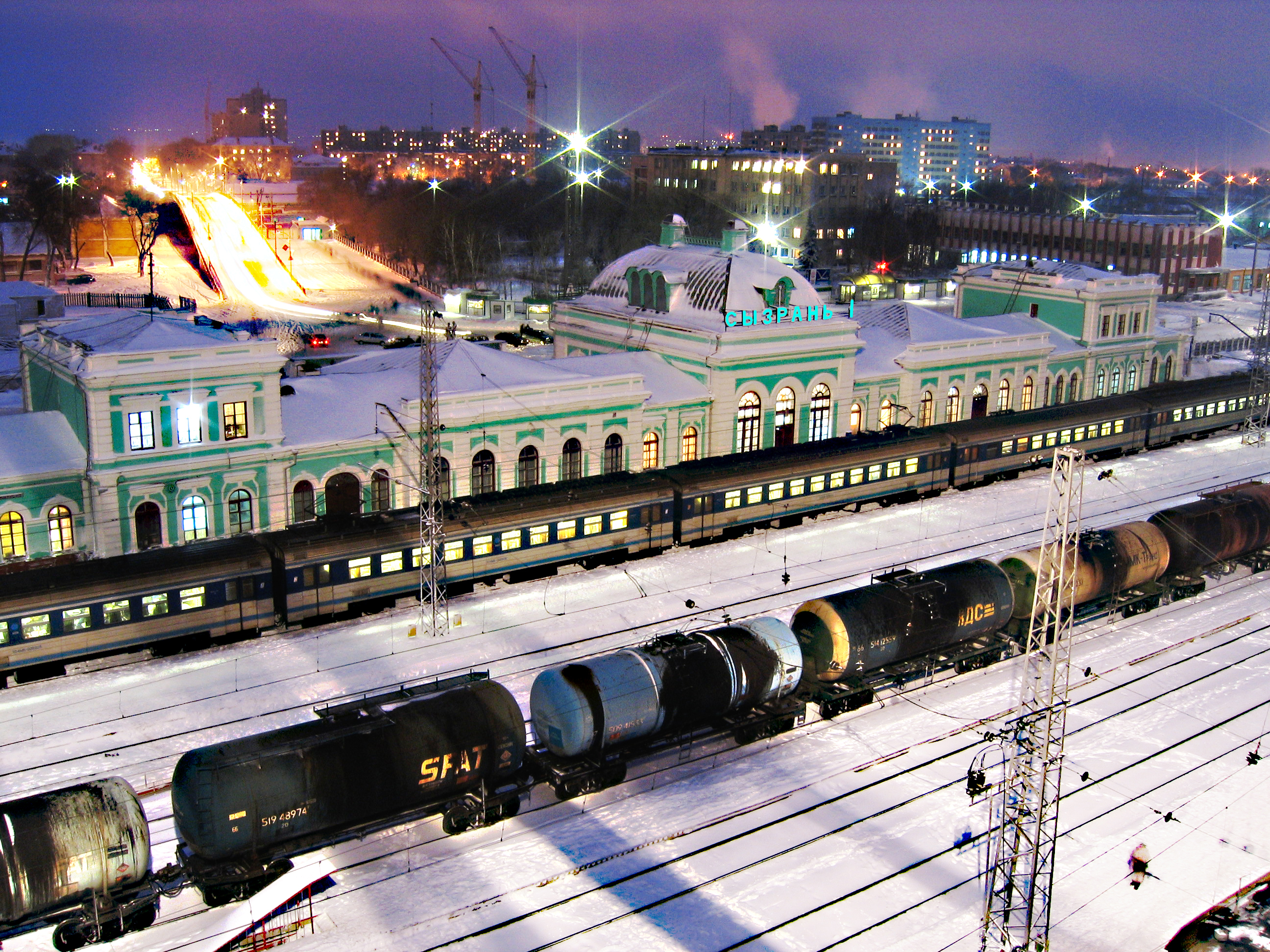
- Syzran I railway station (built in 1874)

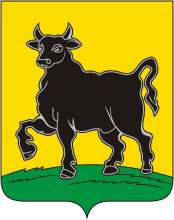
- Flag Coat of arms
- Interactive map of Syzran
- Location of Syzran Syzran (Samara Oblast)
- Coordinates: 53°09′24″N 48°28′20″E
- Country: Russia
- Federal subject: Samara Oblast
- Founded: 1683
- City status since: 1796

Government
  - Mayor: Sergey Volodchenkov
- Elevation: 50 m (160 ft)

Population (2010 Census)
  - Total: 178,750
  - Estimate (2025): 159,587 (−10.7%)
  - Rank: 101st in 2010

Administrative status
  - Subordinated to: city of oblast significance of Syzran
  - Capital of: Syzransky District, city of oblast significance of Syzran

Municipal status
  - Urban okrug: Syzran Urban Okrug
  - Capital of: Syzran Urban Okrug, Syzransky Municipal District
- Time zone: UTC+4 (MSK+1)
- Postal code: 446000
- Dialing code: +7 8464
- OKTMO ID: 36735000001
- Website: adm.syzran.ru

Syzran (Russian: Сызрань, IPA: [ˈsɨzrənʲ]) is the third largest city in Samara Oblast, Russia, located on the right bank of the Saratov Reservoir of the Volga River. Population: 165,725 (2021 census); 178,750 (2010 census); 188,107 (2002 census); 174,335 (1989 Soviet census).

Historical population
Year	Pop.	±%
1897	32,000	—
1926	50,000	+56.2%
1939	83,000	+66.0%
1959	148,391	+78.8%
1970	173,347	+16.8%
1979	178,498	+3.0%
1989	174,335	−2.3%
2002	188,107	+7.9%
2010	178,750	−5.0%
2021	165,725	−7.3%
Source: Census data

== History ==
Founded in 1683 as a fortress, Syzran grew into an important trading center and was granted town status in 1796. One tower from the 17th-century fortress still stands. It is also the site of Syzran Bridge, once the longest bridge in Europe.

== Administrative and municipal status ==
Within the framework of administrative divisions, Syzran serves as the administrative center of Syzransky District, even though it is not a part of it. As an administrative division, it is, together with three rural localities, incorporated separately as the city of oblast significance of Syzran—an administrative unit with the status equal to that of the districts. As a municipal division, the city of oblast significance of Syzran is incorporated as Syzran Urban Okrug.

== Economy ==
The city's main employers are a large oil refinery owned by Rosneft, OAO Tyazhmash heavy industry machinery metallurgy mechanical turbines related to electricity production (and working with Czech Blansko firm CKD Blansko on some works, like in South America), and the Syzran power station.

== Notable people ==
- Konstantin Fedin, novelist and literary functionary
- Alexey Tolstoy, writer
- Arkady Ostrovsky, composer
- Andrei Sinyavsky, writer
- Mikhail Korniyenko, cosmonaut
- Viktor Nikitin, singer
- Ekaterina Vetkova, handball player

== Twin towns and sister cities ==
Syzran is twinned with:

- Pingdingshan, Henan, China (November 28, 2000)
