= Kinel =

City in Samara Oblast, Russia

Kinel Кинель
- City
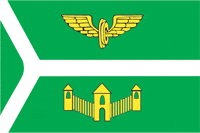
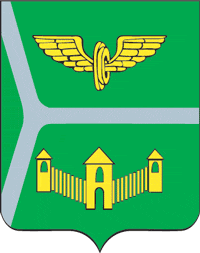
- Flag Coat of arms
- Interactive map of Kinel
- Location of Kinel Kinel (Samara Oblast)
- Coordinates: 53°13′20″N 50°38′00″E
- Country: Russia
- Federal subject: Samara Oblast
- Founded: 1837
- City status since: 1944

Government
  - Leader: Chihirev Vladimir Alexandrovich
- Elevation: 35 m (115 ft)

Population (2010 Census)
  - Total: 34,491
  - Estimate (2023): 36,358 (+5.4%)

Administrative status
  - Subordinated to: city of federal subject significance of Kinel
  - Capital of: Kinelsky District, city of oblast significance of Kinel

Municipal status
  - Urban okrug: Kinel Urban Okrug
  - Capital of: Kinel Urban Okrug, Kinelsky Municipal District
- Time zone: UTC+4 (MSK+1)
- Postal code: 446430
- OKTMO ID: 36708000001

Kinel (Russian: Кине́ль) is a city in Samara Oblast, Russia, located on the Bolshoy Kinel River near its confluence with the Samara River, 41 kilometers (25 mi) east of Samara. Population: 34,491 (2010 census); 34,385 (2002 census); 33,412 (1989 Soviet census).

== History ==
It was founded in 1837. In 1877, during the construction of the Samara–Orenburg railroad, the railway station of Kinel was built nearby. The station became a junction by 1888. In 1944, Kinel was granted city status.

== Administrative and municipal status ==
Within the framework of administrative divisions, Kinel serves as the administrative center of Kinelsky District, even though it is not a part of it. As an administrative division, it is, together with two urban-type settlements, incorporated separately as the city of federal subject significance of Kinel—an administrative unit with the status equal to that of the districts. As a municipal division, the town of oblast significance of Kinel is incorporated as Kinel Urban Okrug.
