= Krasnoyarsky District, Samara Oblast =

Krasnoyarsky District Красноярский район (Russian)
- District
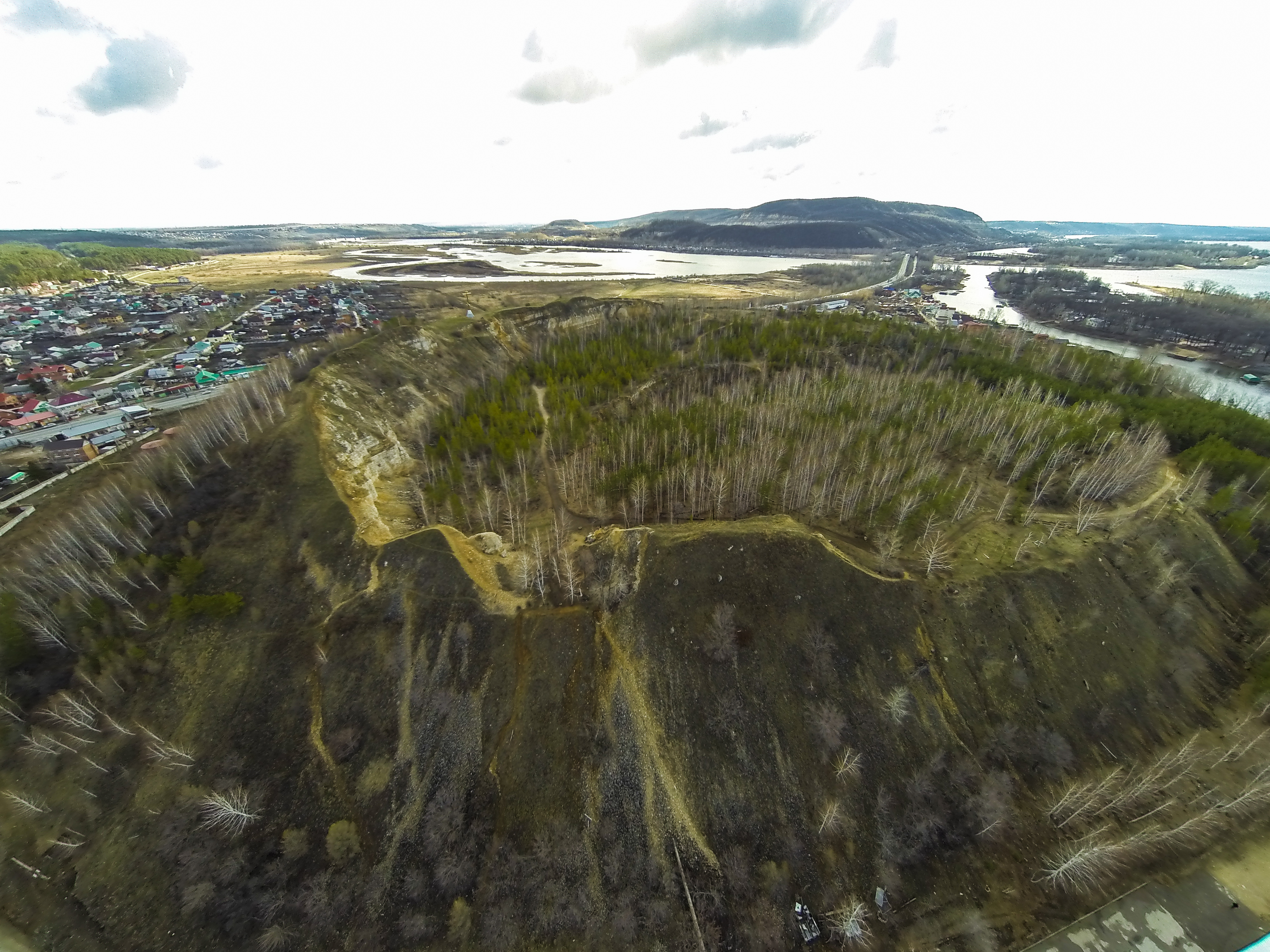
- Tsarev Mound, Krasnoyarsky District

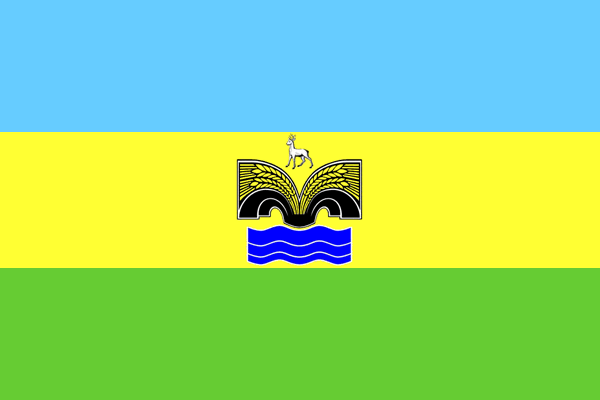
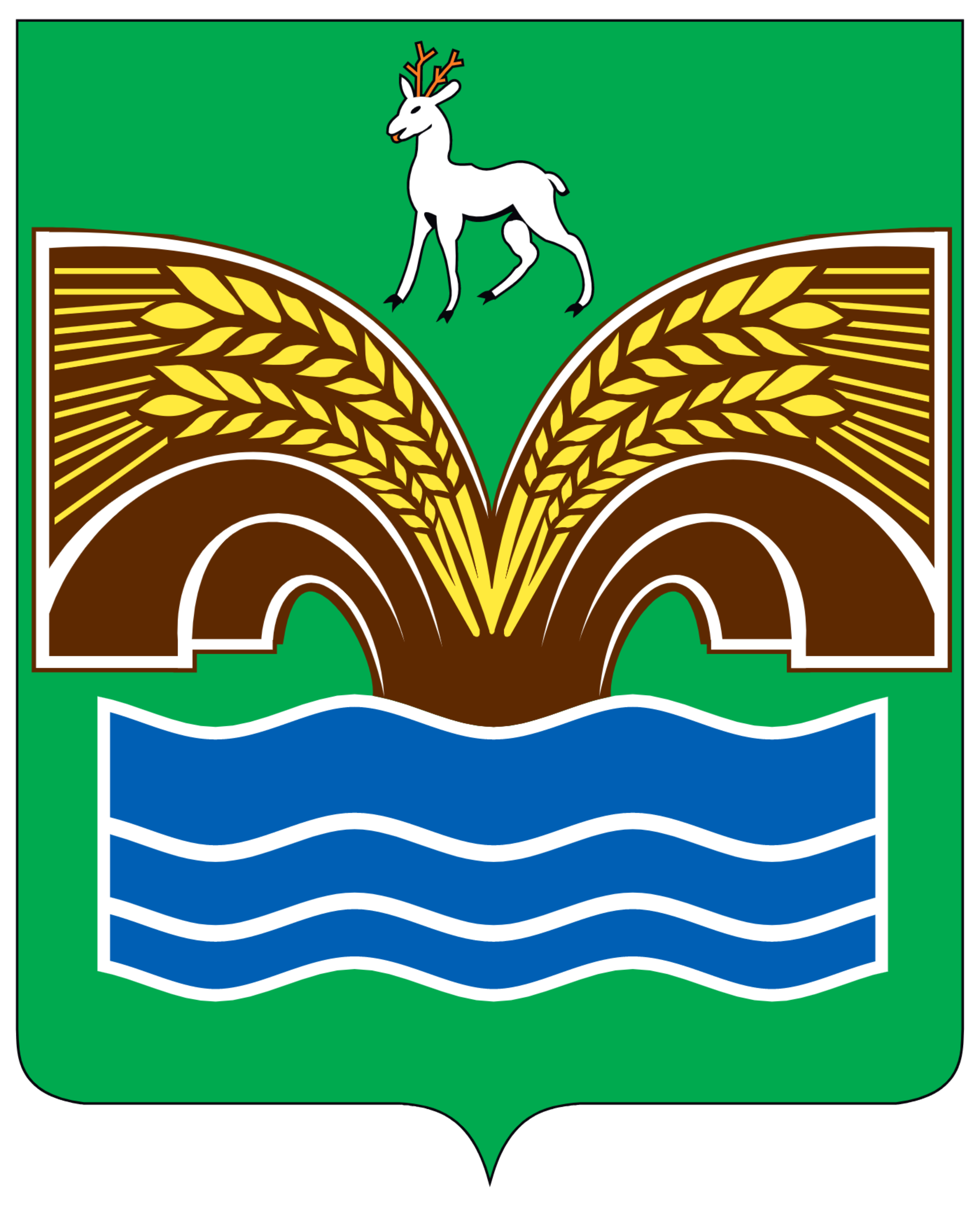
- Flag Coat of arms
- Location of Krasnoyarsky District in Samara Oblast
- Coordinates: 53°29′56″N 50°24′14″E
- Country: Russia
- Federal subject: Samara Oblast
- Established: 16 July 1928
- Administrative center: Krasny Yar

Area
  - Total: 2,310 km^{2} (890 sq mi)

Population (2010 Census)
  - Total: 54,479
  - Density: 23.6/km^{2} (61.1/sq mi)
  - Urban: 44.2%
  - Rural: 55.8%

Administrative structure
  - Inhabited localities: 3 urban-type settlements, 90 rural localities

Municipal structure
  - Municipally incorporated as: Krasnoyarsky Municipal District
  - Municipal divisions: 3 urban settlements, 10 rural settlements
- Time zone: UTC+4 (MSK+1)
- OKTMO ID: 36628000
- Website: http://www.kryaradm.ru/

Krasnoyarsky District (Russian: Красноя́рский райо́н) is an administrative and municipal district (raion), one of the twenty-seven in Samara Oblast, Russia. It is located in the northern central part of the oblast. The area of the district is 2,310 square kilometers (890 sq mi). Its administrative center is the rural locality (a selo) of Krasny Yar. Population: 54,497 (2010 Census); 55,027 (2002 census); 50,945 (1989 Soviet census). The population of Krasny Yar accounts for 14.6% of the district's total population.
