= Bezenchuksky District =

Bezenchuksky District Безенчукский район (Russian)
- District
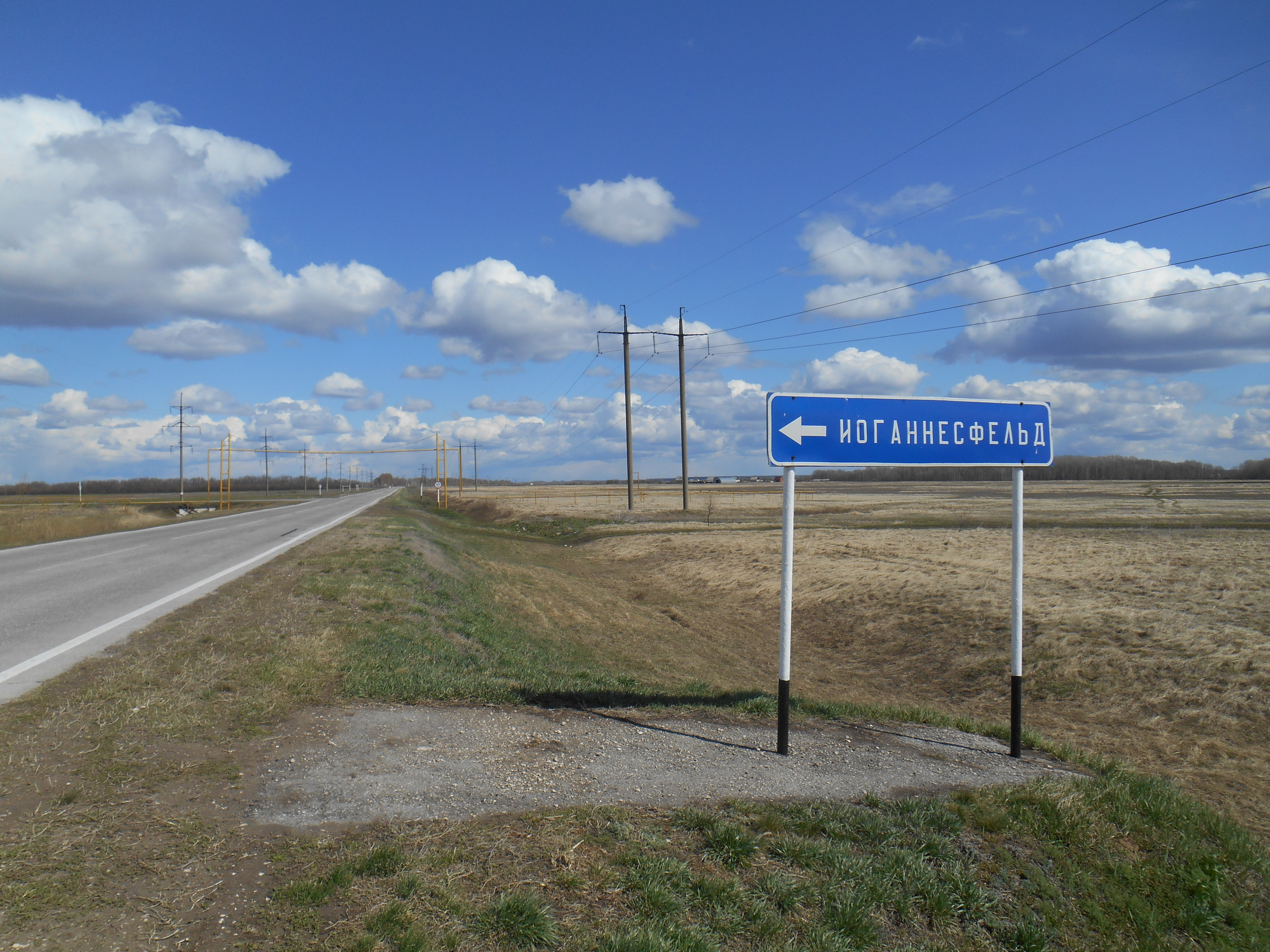
- Turnoff to settlement of Logannesfeld, Bezenchuksky District

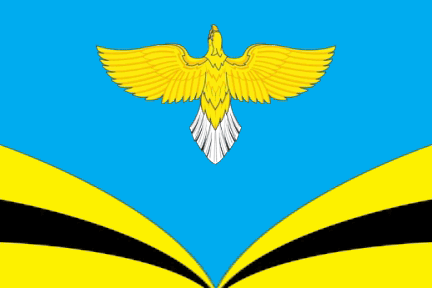
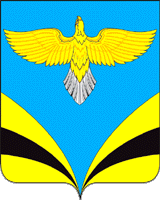
- Flag Coat of arms
- Location of Bezenchuksky District in Samara Oblast
- Coordinates: 52°59′N 49°26′E
- Country: Russia
- Federal subject: Samara Oblast
- Established: 25 January 1935
- Administrative center: Bezenchuk

Area
  - Total: 1,988.8 km^{2} (767.9 sq mi)

Population (2010 Census)
  - Total: 42,095
  - Density: 21.166/km^{2} (54.820/sq mi)
  - Urban: 61.9%
  - Rural: 38.1%

Administrative structure
  - Inhabited localities: 2 urban-type settlements, 49 rural localities

Municipal structure
  - Municipally incorporated as: Bezenchuksky Municipal District
  - Municipal divisions: 2 urban settlements, 10 rural settlements
- Time zone: UTC+4 (MSK+1)
- OKTMO ID: 36604000
- Website: http://admbezenchuk.ru/

Bezenchuksky District (Russian: Безенчу́кский райо́н) is an administrative and municipal district (raion), one of the twenty-seven in Samara Oblast, Russia. It is located in the west of the oblast. The area of the district is 1,988.8 square kilometers (767.9 sq mi). Its administrative center is the urban locality (an urban-type settlement) of Bezenchuk. Population: 42,095 (2010 Census); 43,571 (2002 census); 44,003 (1989 Soviet census). The population of Bezenchuk accounts for 54.5% of the district's total population.
