= Kinelsky District =

Kinelsky District Кинельский район (Russian)
- District
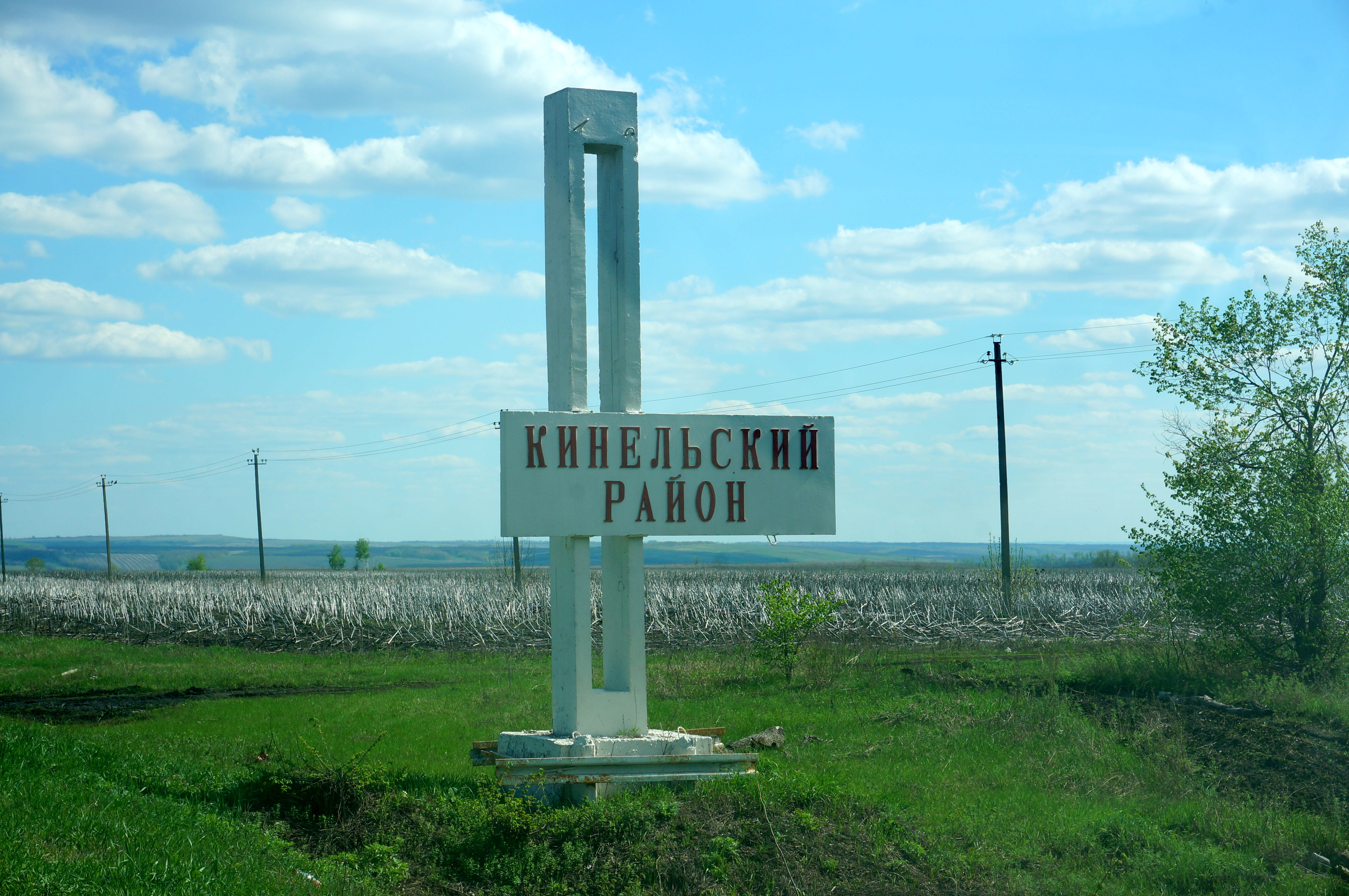
- Border sign, Kinelsky District

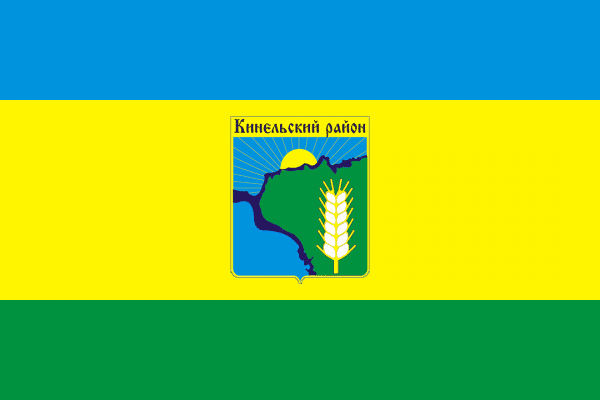
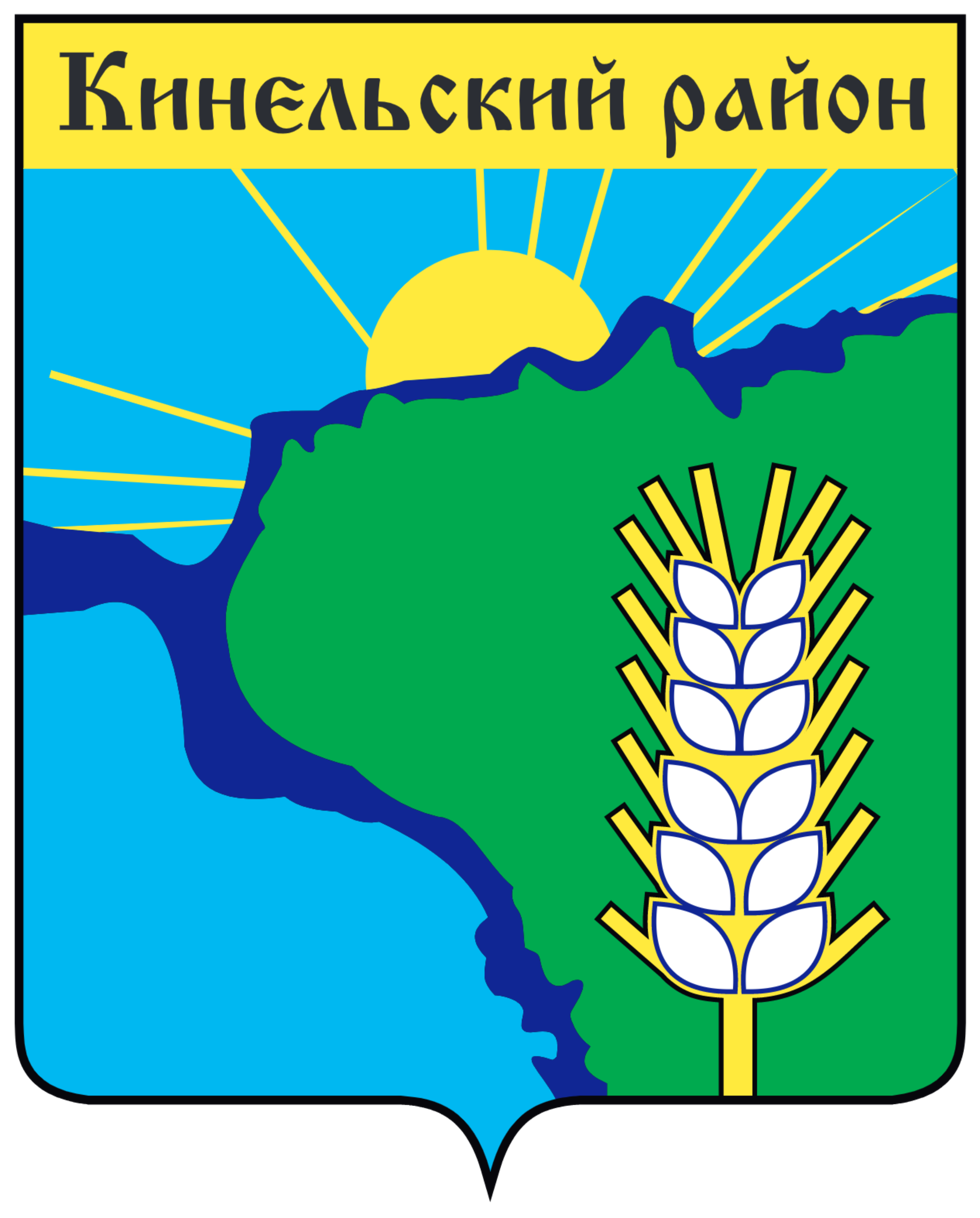
- Flag Coat of arms
- Location of Kinelsky District in Samara Oblast
- Coordinates: 53°14′N 50°37′E
- Country: Russia
- Federal subject: Samara Oblast
- Established: 16 July 1928
- Administrative center: Kinel

Area
  - Total: 2,103.7 km^{2} (812.2 sq mi)

Population (2010 Census)
  - Total: 33,258
  - Density: 15.809/km^{2} (40.946/sq mi)
  - Urban: 0%
  - Rural: 100%

Administrative structure
  - Inhabited localities: 63 rural localities

Municipal structure
  - Municipally incorporated as: Kinelsky Municipal District
  - Municipal divisions: 0 urban settlements, 12 rural settlements
- Time zone: UTC+4 (MSK+1)
- OKTMO ID: 36618000
- Website: http://www.kinel.ru/

Kinelsky District (Russian: Кине́льский райо́н) is an administrative and municipal district (raion), one of the twenty-seven in Samara Oblast, Russia. It is located in the center of the oblast. The area of the district is 2,103.7 square kilometers (812.2 sq mi). Its administrative center is the town of Kinel (which is not administratively a part of the district). Population: 33,258 (2010 Census); 30,484 (2002 census); 31,000 (1989 Soviet census).

== Administrative and municipal status ==
Within the framework of administrative divisions, Kinelsky District is one of the twenty-seven in the oblast. The town of Kinel serves as its administrative center, despite being incorporated separately as a town of oblast significance—an administrative unit with the status equal to that of the districts.

As a municipal division, the district is incorporated as Kinelsky Municipal District. The town of oblast significance of Kinel is incorporated separately from the district as Kinel Urban Okrug.
