= Samarsky City District =

Samarsky City District Самарский район
- District
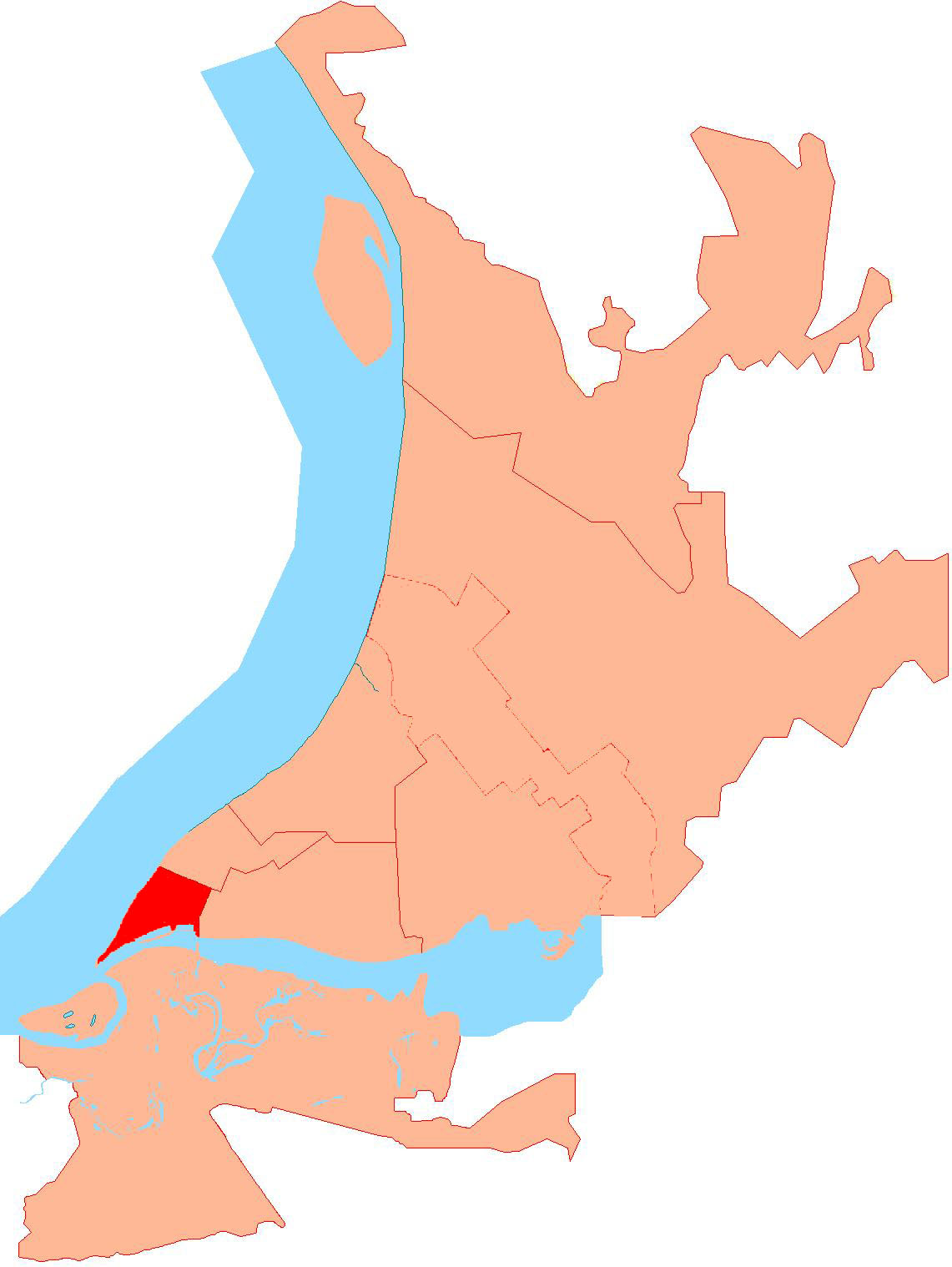
- Location of Samarsky City District on the map of Samara
- Coordinates: 53°10′59.99″N 50°4′59.99″E
- Country: Russia
- Federal subject: Samara Oblast
- Administrative center: Samara
- Time zone: UTC+4 (MSK+1)
- OKTMO ID: 36701340

Samarsky City District (Russian: Самарский район) is a district (raion) of the city of Samara, Samara Oblast, Russia. Population: 30,519 (2010 Census); 31,120 (2002 Census);
