= Kuybyshevsky City District, Samara =

Kuybyshevsky City District Куйбышевский район (Russian)
- District
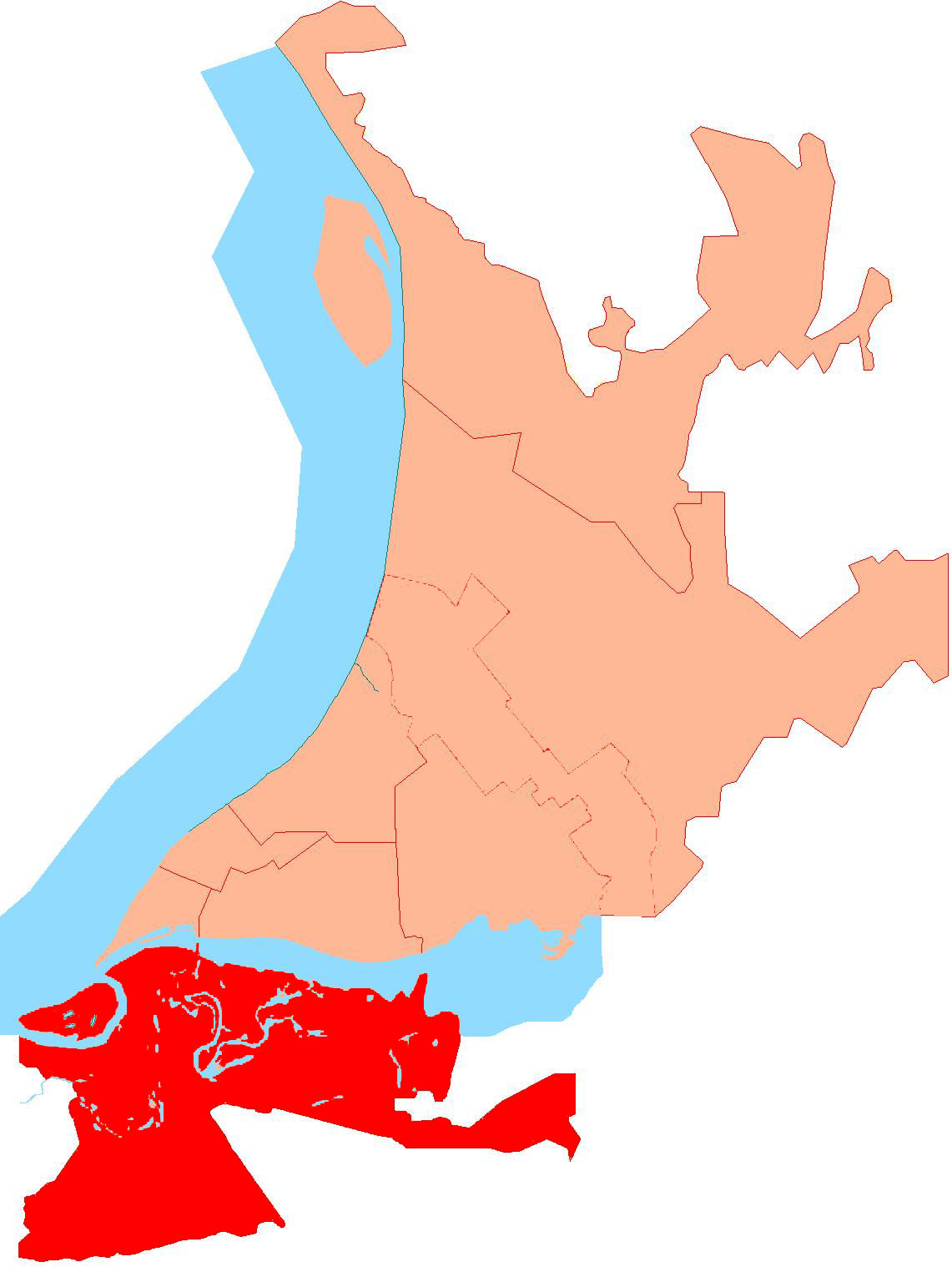
- Location of Kuybyshevsky City District on the map of Samara
- Coordinates: 53°9′0″N 50°4′48″E
- Country: Russia
- Federal subject: Samara Oblast
- Administrative center: Samara
- Time zone: UTC+4 (MSK+1)
- OKTMO ID: 36701320

Kuybyshevsky City District (Russian: Куйбышевский район) is a district (raion) of the city of Samara, Samara Oblast, Russia. Population: 86,280 (2010 Census); 80,727 (2002 Census); 71,739 (1989 Soviet census).
