= Leninsky City District, Samara =

Leninsky City District Ленинский район (Russian)
- District
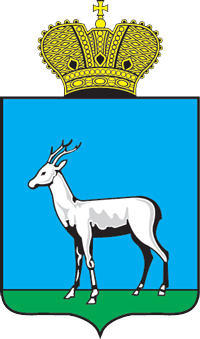
- Coat of arms

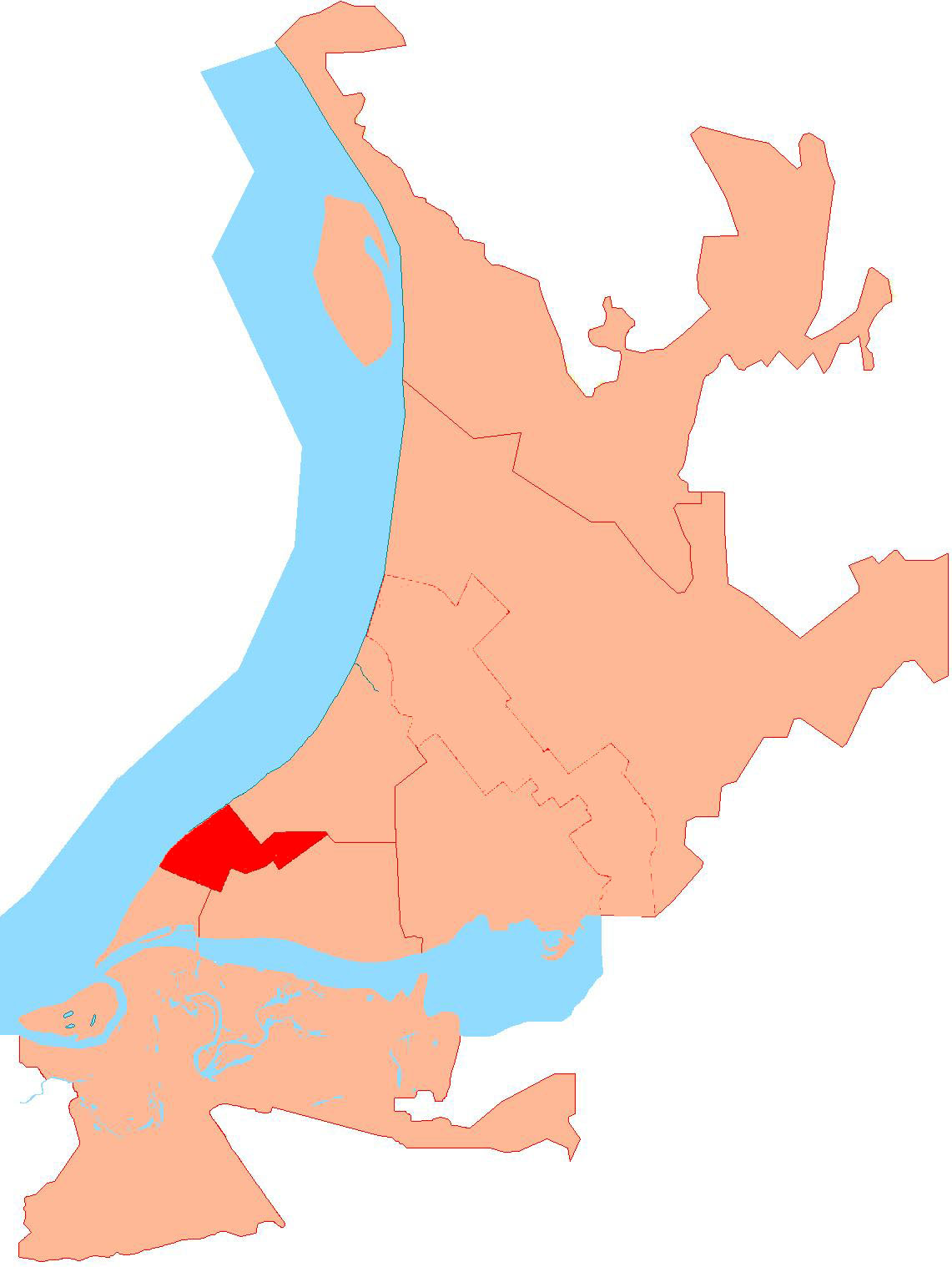
- Location of Leninsky City District on the map of Samara
- Coordinates: 53°12′1.98″N 50°7′28.27″E
- Country: Russia
- Federal subject: Samara Oblast
- Administrative center: Samara

Area
  - Total: 5.4 km^{2} (2.1 sq mi)
- Time zone: UTC+4 (MSK+1)
- OKTMO ID: 36701325

Leninsky City District (Russian: Ленинский район) is a district (raion) of the city of Samara, Samara Oblast, Russia. Population: 65,485 (2010 Census); 64,975 (2002 Census); 77,851 (1989 Soviet census).
