= Samara (Volga) =

River in Russia

Samara River
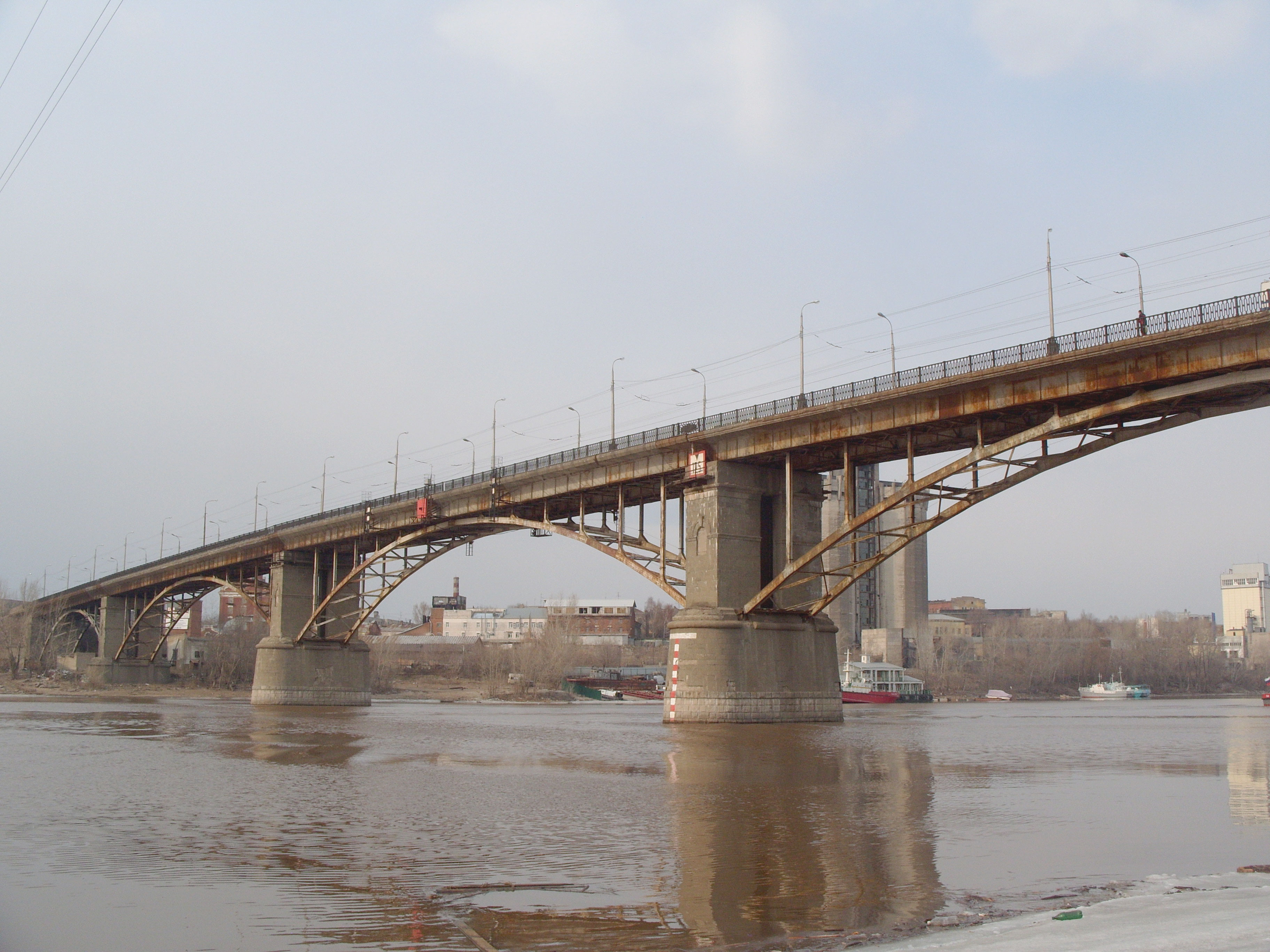
- Samara river in the city of Samara

Location
- Country: Russia

Physical characteristics
- Mouth: Volga
  - coordinates: 53°10′01″N 50°03′43″E
- Length: 594 km (369 mi)
- Basin size: 46,500 km^{2} (18,000 sq mi)
- Discharge
  - average: approx. 50 m^{3}/s (1,800 cu ft/s)

Basin features
- Progression: Volga→ Caspian Sea

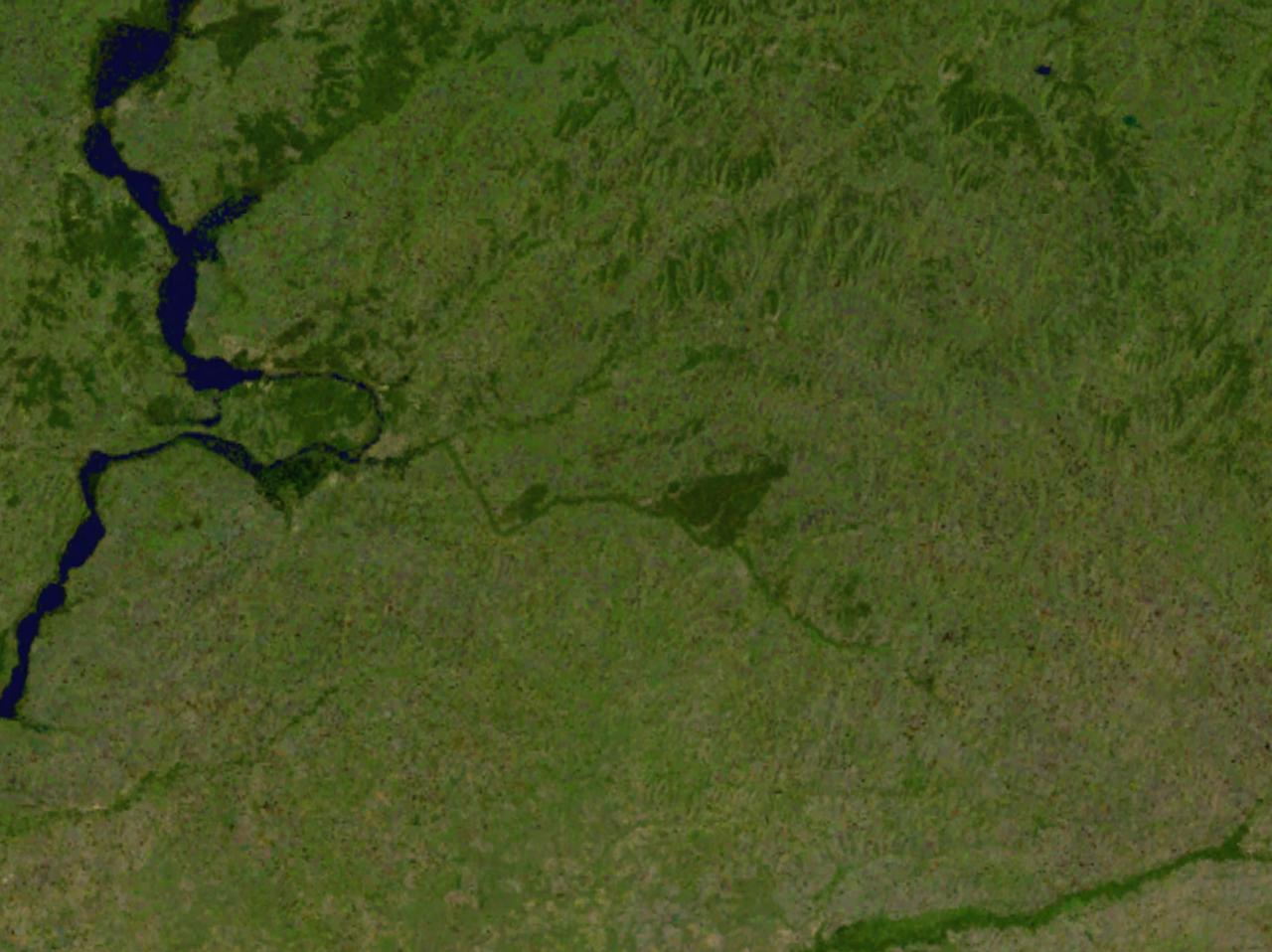
Lower Samara from space flowing left into Volga river, Ural River at lower right

The Samara (Russian: Сама́ра, IPA: [sɐˈmarə]) is a river in Russia and a left-bank tributary of the Volga. It flows into the Volga at the city of Samara. Its largest tributary is the Bolshoy Kinel. It is 594 kilometres (369 mi) long, and its drainage basin covers 46,500 square kilometres (18,000 mi^{2}).

== Honours ==
The asteroid 26922 Samara was named on 1 June 2007 to honour the river, which has also given the city of Samara its name.

Samarabatrachus, a temnospondyl from the Lower Triassic (Induan) deposits of Borsky District, Samara Oblast, was named after this river in 2016. This animal is known by a skull of 15.3 cm in length.
