= Oktyabrsky City District, Samara =

Oktyabrsky City District Октябрьский район
- District
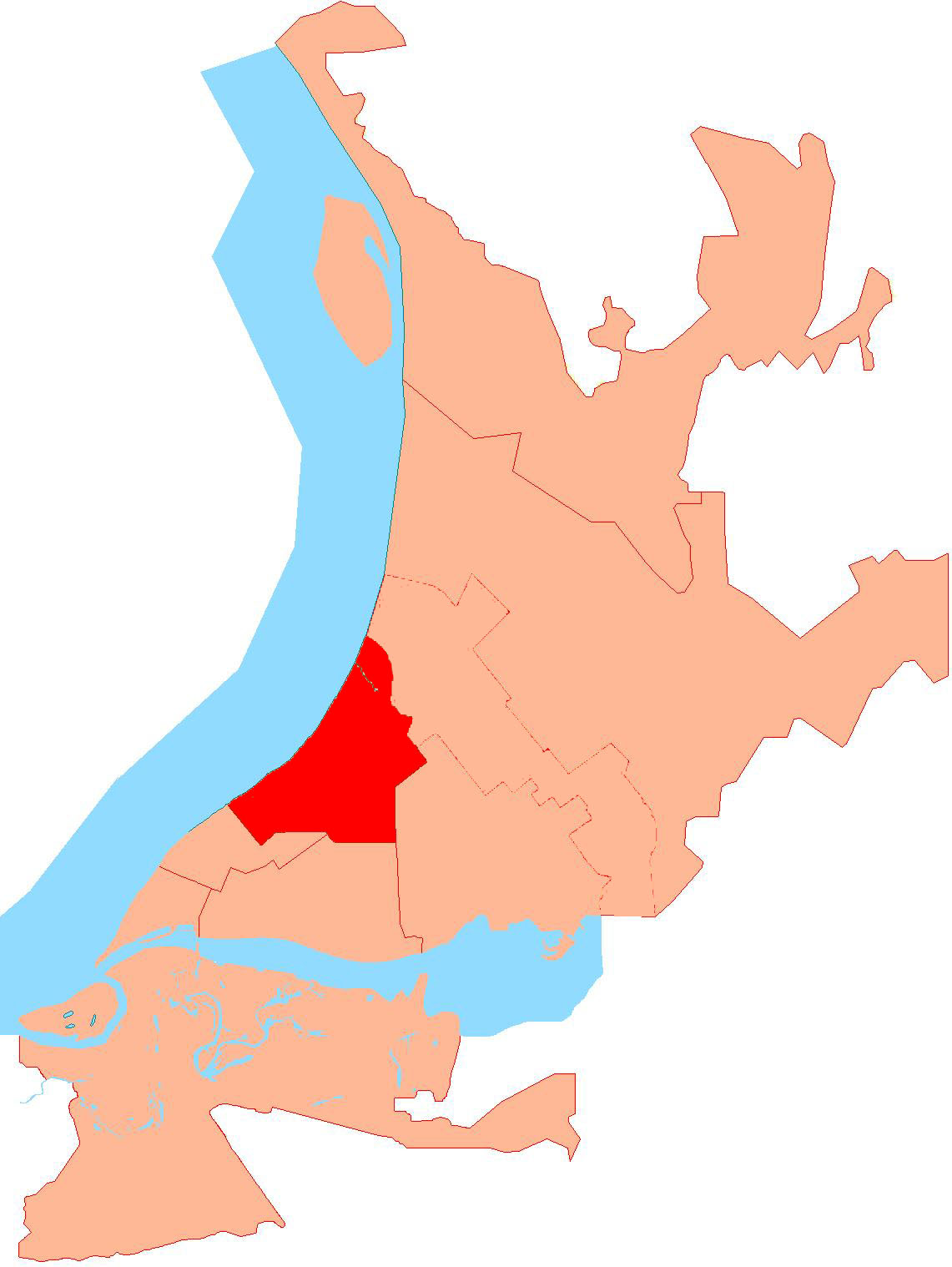
- Location of Oktyabrsky City District on the map of Samara
- Coordinates: 53°13′12″N 50°9′0″E
- Country: Russia
- Federal subject: Samara Oblast
- Administrative center: Samara
- Time zone: UTC+4 (MSK+1)
- OKTMO ID: 36701330

Oktyabrsky City District (Russian: Октябрьский район) is a district (raion) of the city of Samara, Samara Oblast, Russia. Population: 114,223 (2010 Census); 115,982 (2002 Census); 139,249 (1989 Soviet census).
