= Bezenchuk =

Bezenchuk Безенчук
- Urban-type settlement
- Interactive map of Bezenchuk
- Location of Bezenchuk Bezenchuk (Samara Oblast)
- Coordinates: 52.9853°N 49.4326°E
- Country: Russia
- Federal subject: Samara Oblast
- Administrative district: Bezenchuksky District
- Founded: 1886
- Elevation: 50 m (160 ft)

Population (2010 Census)
  - Total: 22,952
  - Estimate (2021): 20,516 (−10.6%)
- Time zone: UTC+4 (MSK+1)
- Postal code: 446250
- OKTMO ID: 36604151051

Bezenchuk (Russian: Безенчук) is an urban locality (an urban-type settlement) in Bezenchuksky District of Samara Oblast, Russia. Population: 22,952 (2010 census); 23,921 (2002 census); 23,650 (1989 Soviet census).

== Climate ==
Climate data for Bezenchuk (extremes 1904-present)
Month	Jan	Feb	Mar	Apr	May	Jun	Jul	Aug	Sep	Oct	Nov	Dec	Year
Record high °C (°F)	5.1 (41.2)	6.5 (43.7)	19.6 (67.3)	32.4 (90.3)	37.3 (99.1)	40.0 (104.0)	41.0 (105.8)	42.5 (108.5)	35.5 (95.9)	27.7 (81.9)	16.7 (62.1)	7.5 (45.5)	42.5 (108.5)
Mean daily maximum °C (°F)	−6.3 (20.7)	−5.7 (21.7)	1.1 (34.0)	13.5 (56.3)	22.5 (72.5)	26.3 (79.3)	28.2 (82.8)	26.6 (79.9)	20.1 (68.2)	11.3 (52.3)	1.5 (34.7)	−4.8 (23.4)	11.2 (52.2)
Mean daily minimum °C (°F)	−14.0 (6.8)	−14.6 (5.7)	−8.1 (17.4)	1.9 (35.4)	8.7 (47.7)	13.1 (55.6)	15.0 (59.0)	13.3 (55.9)	8.0 (46.4)	2.3 (36.1)	−4.5 (23.9)	−11.5 (11.3)	0.8 (33.4)
Record low °C (°F)	−47.3 (−53.1)	−40.1 (−40.2)	−34.0 (−29.2)	−25.8 (−14.4)	−10.8 (12.6)	−1.7 (28.9)	3.0 (37.4)	0.4 (32.7)	−8.5 (16.7)	−20.3 (−4.5)	−30.6 (−23.1)	−40.2 (−40.4)	−47.3 (−53.1)
Average precipitation mm (inches)	38.8 (1.53)	30.6 (1.20)	30.3 (1.19)	32.2 (1.27)	30.8 (1.21)	46.4 (1.83)	47.3 (1.86)	35.0 (1.38)	41.8 (1.65)	36.6 (1.44)	34.1 (1.34)	35.8 (1.41)	439.7 (17.31)
Source: Pogoda.ru.net
