= Zheleznodorozhny City District, Samara =

Zheleznodorozhny City District Железнодорожный район (Russian)
- District
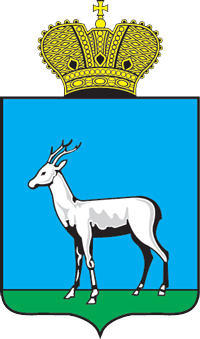
- Coat of arms

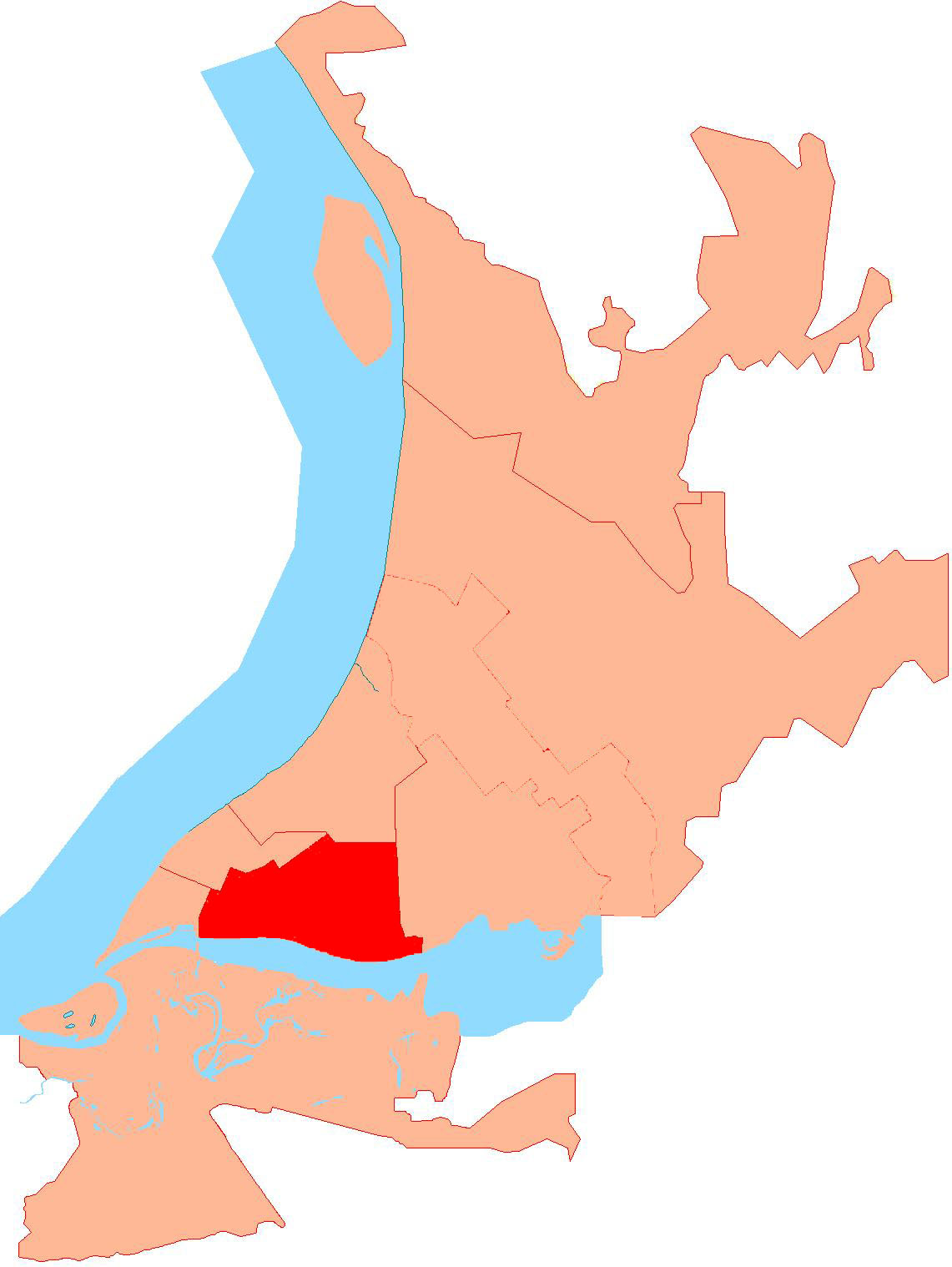
- Location of Zheleznodorozhny City District on the map of Samara
- Coordinates: 53°10′59.99″N 50°10′0.01″E
- Country: Russia
- Federal subject: Samara Oblast
- Established: 11 December 1970
- Administrative center: Samara

Area
  - Total: 19.6 km^{2} (7.6 sq mi)
- Time zone: UTC+4 (MSK+1)
- OKTMO ID: 36701305

Zheleznodorozhny City District (Russian: Железнодорожный район) is a district (raion) of the city of Samara, Samara Oblast, Russia. Population: 103,175 (2010 Census); 107,035 (2002 Census); 114,593 (1989 Soviet census).
