= Syzransky District =

Syzransky District Сызранский район (Russian)
- District
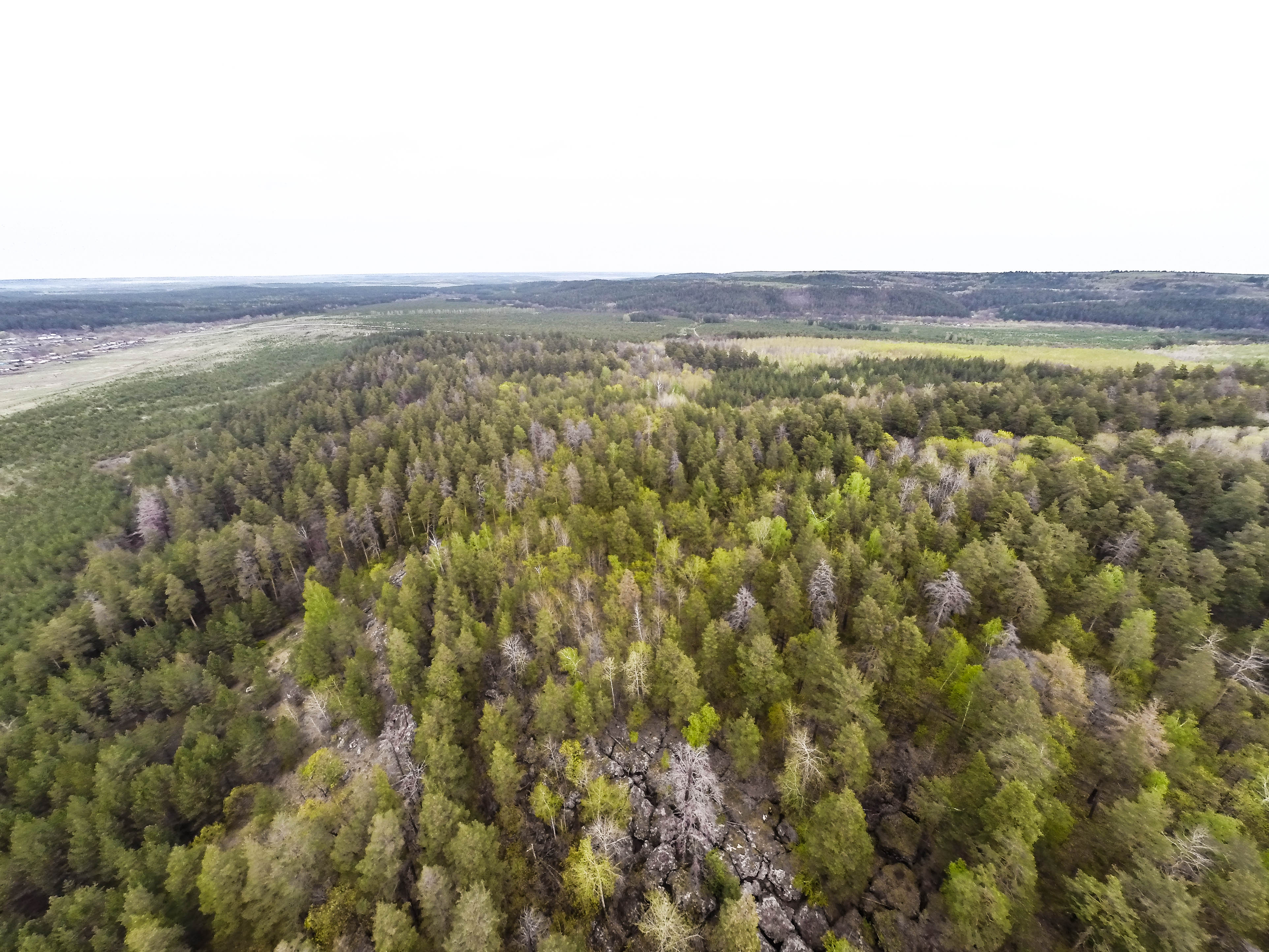
- Racheyskiye Rocks, a protected area of Russia in Syzransky District

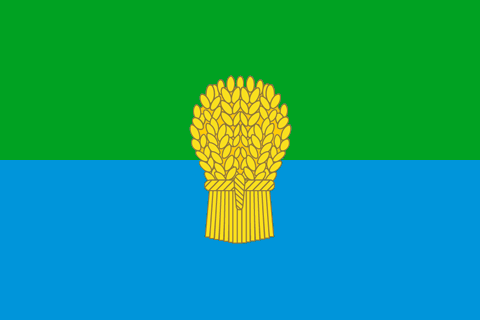
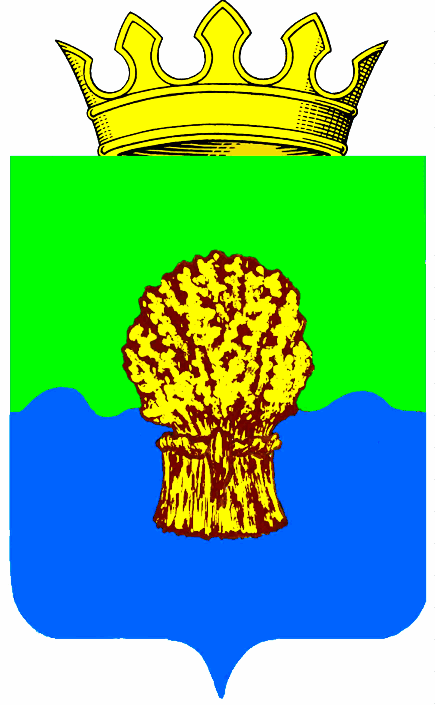
- Flag Coat of arms
- Location of Syzransky District in Samara Oblast
- Coordinates: 53°03′N 48°33′E
- Country: Russia
- Federal subject: Samara Oblast
- Established: 16 July 1928
- Administrative center: Syzran

Area
  - Total: 1,887 km^{2} (729 sq mi)

Population (2010 Census)
  - Total: 25,947
  - Density: 13.75/km^{2} (35.61/sq mi)
  - Urban: 22.9%
  - Rural: 77.1%

Administrative structure
  - Inhabited localities: 2 urban-type settlements, 67 rural localities

Municipal structure
  - Municipally incorporated as: Syzransky Municipal District
  - Municipal divisions: 2 urban settlements, 13 rural settlements
- Time zone: UTC+4 (MSK+1)
- OKTMO ID: 36642000
- Website: http://syzrayon.ru

Population of Syzransky District
- 2010 Census: 25,947
- 2002 Census: 23,964
- 1989 Census: 25,250
- 1979 Census: 25,904

Syzransky District (Russian: Сы́зранский райо́н) is an administrative and municipal district (raion), one of the twenty-seven in Samara Oblast, Russia. It is located in the west of the oblast. The area of the district is 1,887 square kilometers (729 sq mi). Its administrative center is the city of Syzran (which is not administratively a part of the district). As of the 2010 Census, the total population of the district was 25,947.

== Administrative and municipal status ==
Within the framework of administrative divisions, Syzransky District is one of the twenty-seven in the oblast. The city of Syzran serves as its administrative center, despite being incorporated separately as a city of oblast significance—an administrative unit with the status equal to that of the districts.

As a municipal division, the district is incorporated as Syzransky Municipal District. The city of oblast significance of Syzran is incorporated separately from the district as Syzran Urban Okrug.
