= Syzran-I railway station =

Railway station in Syzran, Russia

Syzran-I Сызрань-I
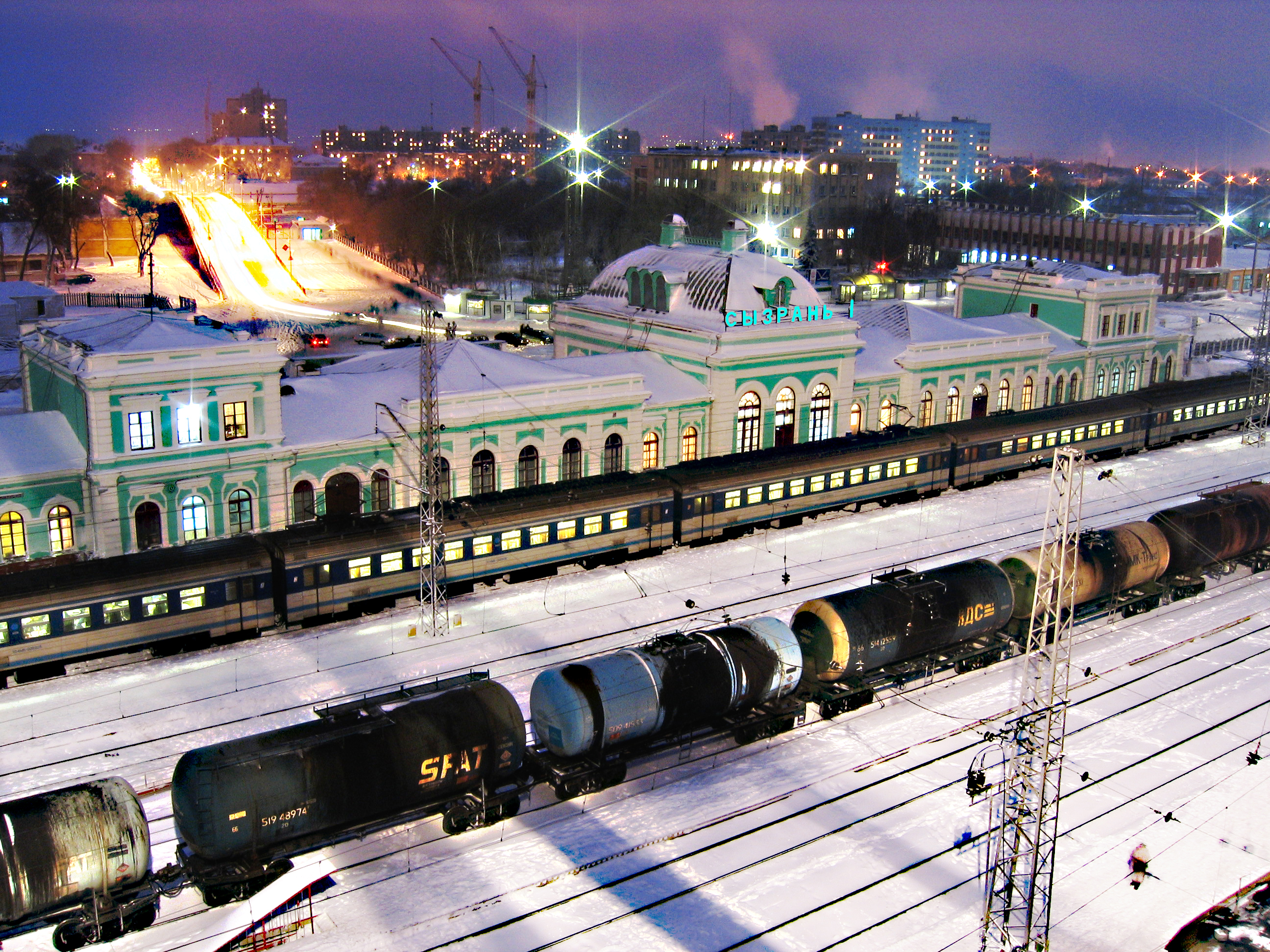
- View of the station

General information
- Location: 1, Privokzalnaya Sqr, Syzran, Samara Oblast Russia
- Coordinates: 53.170076°N 48.481945°E
- Platforms: 3
- Tracks: 71

Construction
- Parking: yes

Other information
- Station code: 635607

History
- Opened: 1874
Location

Syzran-I railway station (Russian: станция Сызрань) is a major mainline railway station located in Syzran, Samara Oblast, Russia. It is a junction of Kuybyshev Railway, 135 km from Samara railway station. The station combines four routes out of Syzran. It is an important junction, where the Samara — Moscow main line, and the railway lines to Penza, Ulyanovsk and Zhigulyovsk diverge. It is approximately 1.2 km from the town center.

== History ==
Syzran I station was opened on 12 October 1874 with the construction of Syzran — Morshansk via Penza railway with the length of 485 versts (517 km). Construction began on 28 April 1872. It was commercial project. The railway was built on the funds of private shareholders. In 1875-1878 on the Morshansk-Syzran railway the traction-heat engineering (dynamometric and indicator) tests of steam locomotives were first held under the leadership of the chief of the traction service A. Bem with the participation of the young engineer Vlaclav Lopushinsky. Houses for railwaymen were built near the station building. In 1880 the railway was extended to Samara. The first railway bridge across the Volga River in its lower reaches was built 10 km from Syzran. It was designed by Nikolai Belelubsky and Konstantin Mikhailovsky. It continued to be the longest in Europe over a sustained period of time with a total length of 1,483 metres (4,865 ft).

Opening of the railway triggered the economic growth, improving the quality of life. Bulk-oil bases of brothers Nobels, Warehouses of Alfred von Vacano brewery, merchants, businessmen, salespeople begun to work in Syzran thanks to convenient and reliable transport links. In the river port cargoes were reloaded from ships to carriages.

In 1892 the Council of Ministers of the Russian Empire nationalized the commercial enterprise engaged in the construction of the Morshansk Syzran railway. By order of the Ministry of Transportation, the Ryazhsk — Morshansk and Ryazhsk — Vyazma railways were combined, forming the Syzran-Vyazma railroad. Emperor Nicholas II of Russia was visiting Syzran railway station. The Emperor arrived accompanied by his brother Mikhail to arrange a review of the troops sent to the Far East. The visit lasted about two hours.

The station building has a waiting room for 40 seats and a capacity for 150 passengers, ticket offices, a booking hall, a medical center and a police room. Full repair of the station was carried out in 2004. In 2014 steam locomotive class L as a monument was erected near the station building.

== Services ==
The station is operated by Russian Railways. Syzran is the terminal for long-distance and suburban trains operated by the Federal Passenger Company and Samara Suburban Passenger Company. The most common destinations are: Samara, Moscow, Adler, Ulyanovsk, Anapa, Yekaterinburg, Chelyabinsk. The average stopping times of passenger trains are of about 15 minutes. The station hosts suburban trains only from Samara.

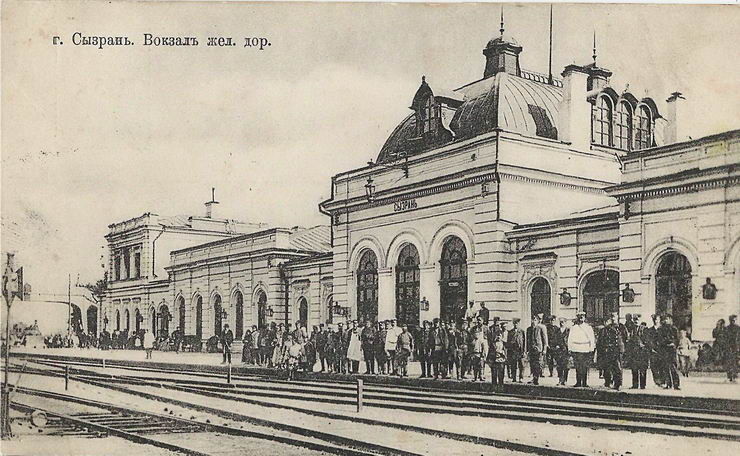
Syzran railway station in the 1910s

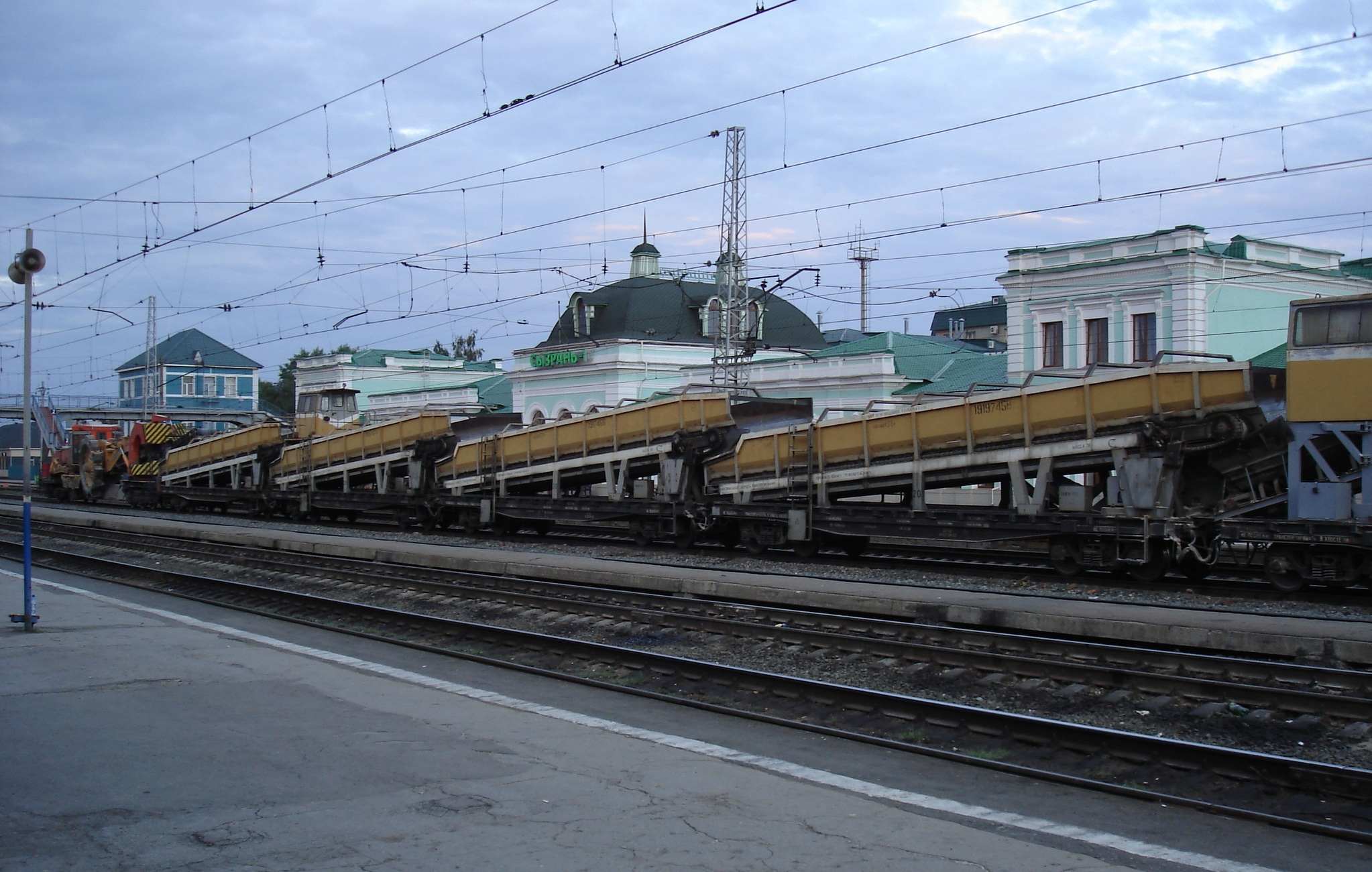
View of the station from a platform
