= Novokuybyshevskaya railway station =

Railway station in Novokuybyshevsk, Russia

Novokuybyshevskaya Новокуйбышевская
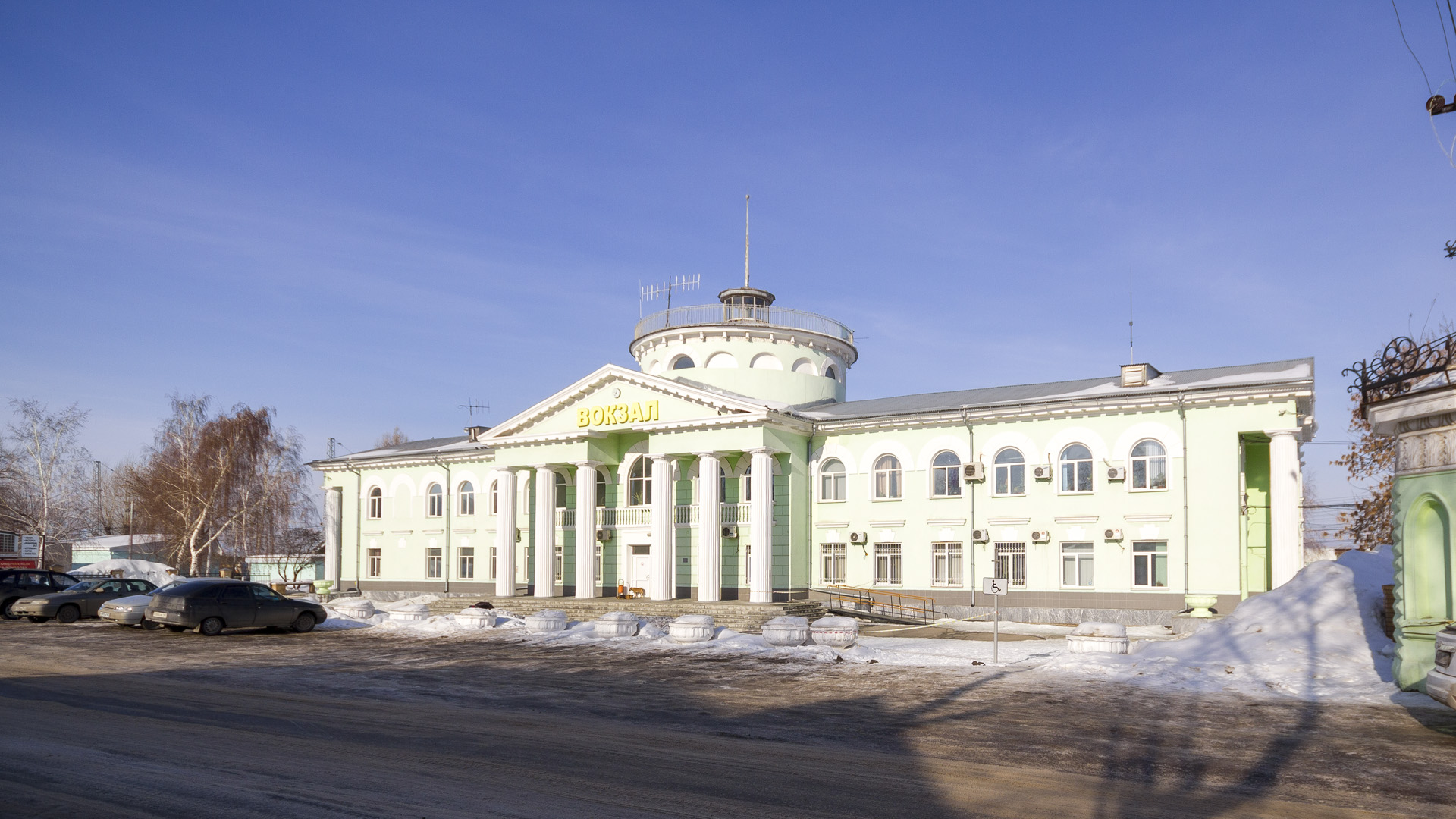
- View of the station

General information
- Location: 1, Vokzalnaya Str, Novokuybyshevsk, Samara Oblast Russia
- Coordinates: 53.114658°N 49.898263°E
- Platforms: 2
- Tracks: 19

Construction
- Parking: yes

Other information
- Station code: 639400

History
- Opened: 1948
- Former names: Molodyozhnaya
Location

Novokuybyshevskaya railway station (Russian: станция Новокуйбышевская) is a railway station located in Novokuybyshevsk, Samara Oblast, Russia. It is 22 km down-line from Samara railway station and is situated between Tomylovo and Lipyagi on the Syzran — Samara line. The station hosts suburban trains from Samara and Syzran. Electric trains ED4M make a passenger trips from Novokuybyshevskaya station. The station is approximately 5,1 km from the town center. The station building has official status as an object of Russian cultural heritage.

== History ==
Novokuybyshevskaya railway station was built in 1948 with the construction of the largest oil refinery and township for oil workers with a population of about 14 thousand people. The first passenger railroad platforms appeared in 1948 in Novokuybyshevsk near the oil refinery. It was named Molodyozhnaya.

After the opening the plant was developing rapidly. Soviet Ministry of Transportation decided to build a station on the 102-kilometer railway. It was erected by the forces of the railway troops and put into operation on 1 October 1951. The station building was designed with the Stalinist architecture style. It is decorated with columns, circular rotunda with a spire in the central part. The interior consists of the expensive materials such as marble. Atrium is decorated with the decorative balustrade.

Regulation of the Samara Region Government No. 376 of 8 August 2013 the station building is nominated to the register of objects of cultural heritage of the Russian Federation.

== Services ==
The station is operated by Russian Railways. Novokuybyshevsk is the terminal for long-distance and suburban trains operated by the Federal Passenger Company and Samara Suburban Passenger Company. The most common destinations are: Samara, Ufa, Adler, Anapa, Krasnoyarsk, Novorossiysk. The average stopping times of passenger trains are of about 2 minutes.

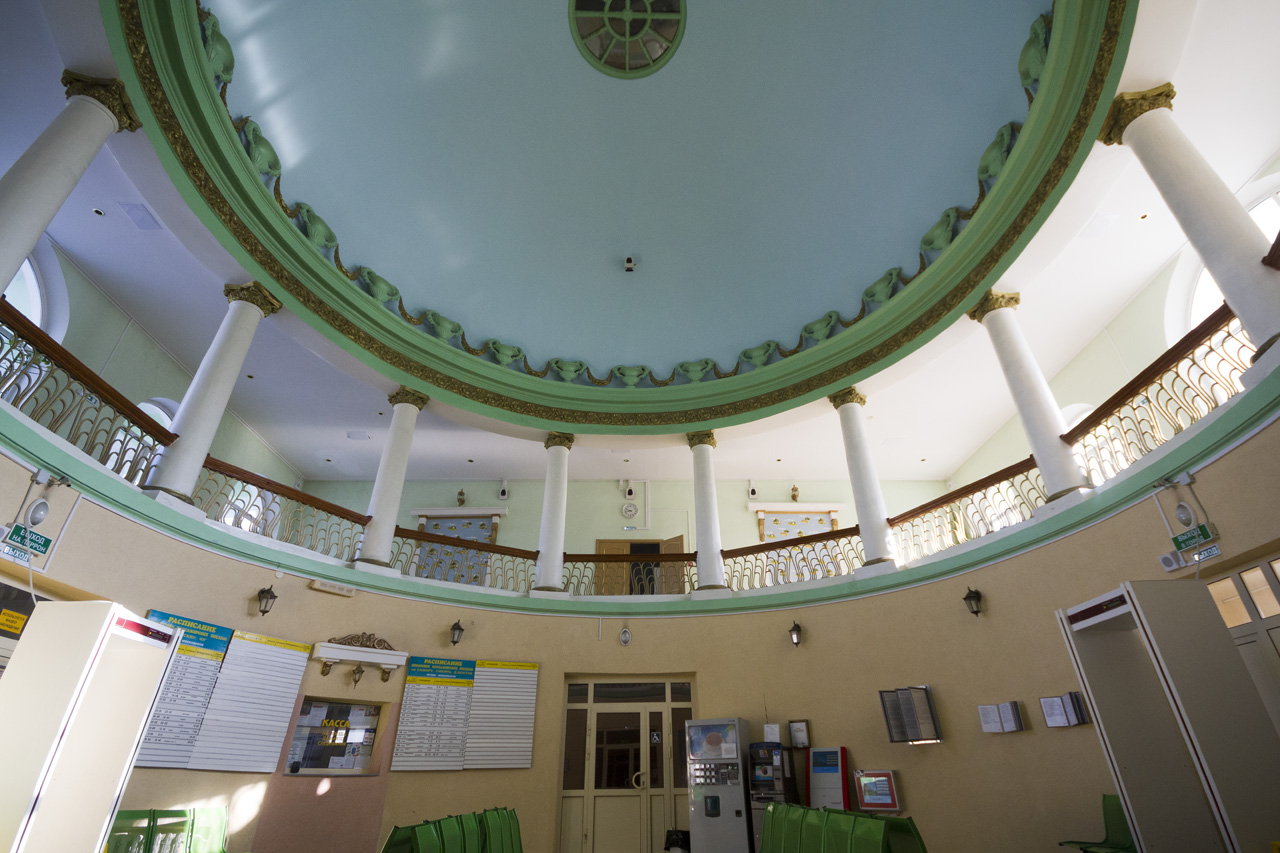
Interior

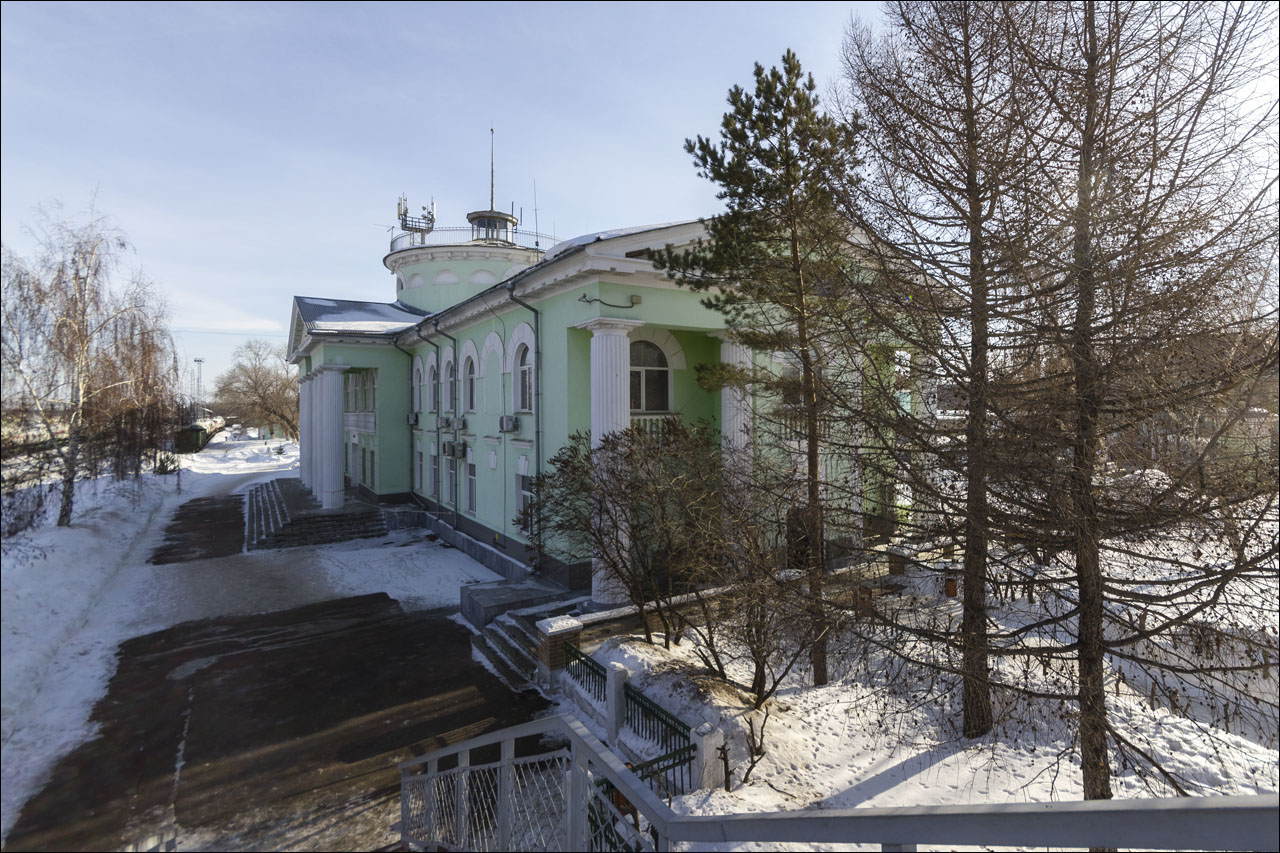
View of the station from a footbridge
