= Nikolai Tikhomirov =

Russian engineer

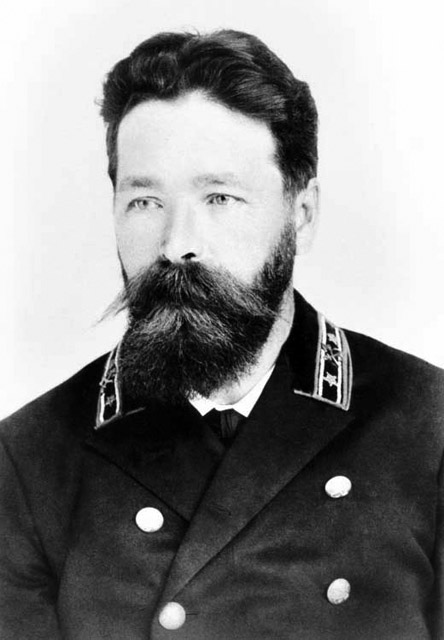
- Born: 1857; Vyatka, Vyatka Governorate, Russian Empire
- Died: 1900 (aged 42–43); Novonikolayevsk Settlement, Tomsk Governorate, Russian Empire

Nikolai Mikhailovich Tikhomirov (Russian: Николай Михайлович Тихомиров; 1857 – 1900) was a Russian engineer, public figure, one of the founders of Novosibirsk.

== Biography ==
Nikolai Tikhomirov was born 30 June (12 July New Style) 1857 in Vyatka, Vyatka Governorate, Russian Empire (today Kirov, Kirov Oblast, Udmurt Republic). He was educated at the Institute of Transport (today the St. Petersburg State Transport University and became an engineer with the Ministry of Transport.

On the West Siberian Railway, under Konstantin Mikhaylovsky he participated in the construction of the bridge across the Ishim River near Petropavl and the Kargat-Krivoshokovo section of line.

In August 1894, Tikhomirov and his family moved to Novonikolayevsk Settlement (now Novosibirsk) and participated in the construction of the Novosibirsk Rail Bridge, the first railway bridge over the Ob River. Grigory Moiseevich Budagov was chief engineer of the project, which was completed in February 1897.

In Novonikolayevsk Settlement, Tikhomirov organized the "Voluntary Fire Society of Novonikolayevsk'," and in 1896-99 he led the construction of Alexander Nevsky Cathedral. In 1897 he was an official of the Russian Empire Census.

Nikolai Tikhomirov died at Novonikolayevsk on 24 October (6 November) 1900. He was buried near the Alexander Nevsky Cathedral, but was later reburied at Zayeltsovskoye Cemetery.

== Family ==
Tikhomirov and his wife, Maria Ananieva, were the parents of a son, Alexander, and two daughters, Tatiana and Olga.

== Awards ==
He was awarded Order of Saint Stanislaus, 3rd Class, Order of Saint Vladimir, 4th Class, and Order of Saint Anna, 3rd Class.
