= American Bridge =

American Bridge may refer to:

- American Bridge Company, civil engineering firm
- American Bridge 21st Century, super PAC
- The American Bridge, Newbury, a former road bridge in Newbury, England
- The American Bridge, Saint Petersburg, a railway bridge in Saint Petersburg, Russia

== See also ==
- American Bridge Association
