= Novosibirsk Rail Bridge =

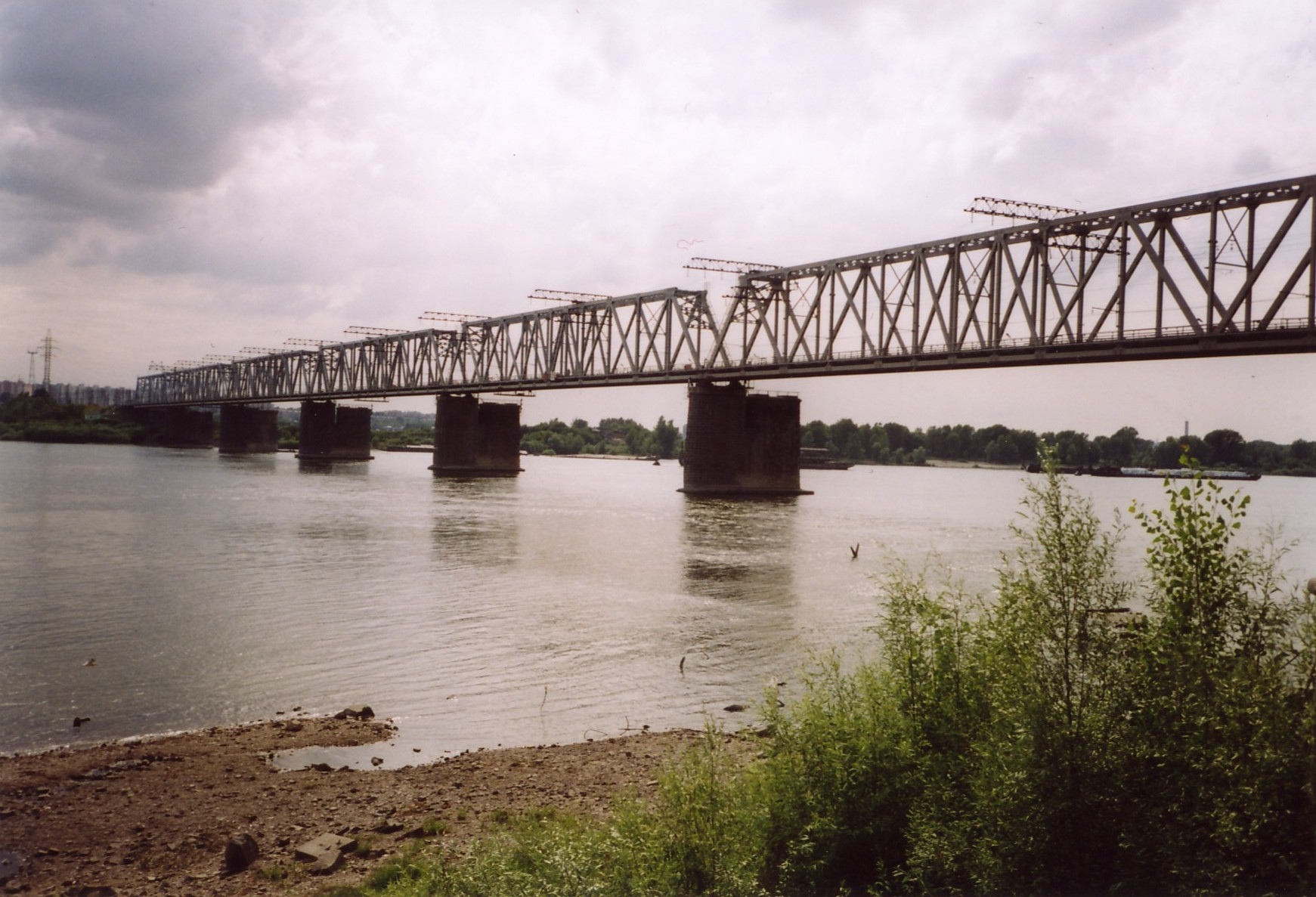
- Coordinates: 55.01°N 82.9180°E
- Carries: Single track (in the period 1984-2000 it was double track)
- Crosses: Ob River
- Locale: Novosibirsk, Russian Federation

Characteristics
- Design: Semi-parabolic trusses, which had a support column and one curved top chord with double-latticework
- Material: Steel, reinforced concrete, stone
- Total length: 983.5 m (3,227 ft)
- No. of spans: 9х109.25 m (358.4 ft)

History
- Designer: Nikolai Belelubsky
- Opened: 1897

Location
- Interactive map of Novosibirsk Rail Bridge

The Novosibirsk Rail Bridge is a single-track bridge across the Ob River, a component of the original Trans-Siberian Railway mainline, was designed by Nikolai Belelubsky and built between 1893 and 1897. Its location, selected by Nikolai Garin-Mikhailovsky near Krivoschekovo village (Russian: Кривощёково), is believed to have influenced Novosibirsk's founding.

== Choosing the crossing point over the Ob ==
Selecting the place where the Trans‑Siberian Railway would cross the Ob River turned out to be a difficult task. One proposed route, which would have taken the line through Omsk, Kolyvan and Tomsk, required building a bridge at a point where the Ob flooded widely every spring. Consequently, the planners later decided to shift the line 30 km south of Kolyvan and to build a separate branch to Tomsk.

It is commonly believed that the work of defining the new crossing segment over the Ob was carried out by Nikolai Garin-Mikhailovsky – a man known not only as a railway engineer but also as a writer. He proposed the only sufficiently narrow stretch where rock outcrops reached the surface. However, other opinions exist. Nikolai Mikhailovsky, as head of the combined survey party, merely endorsed the proposal of the party’s chief field‑engineer, the Polish specialist Vikentiy Ivanovich Roetsky (also rendered as Vikentiy‑Ignatius Roetsky), and, in his capacity as party leader, drafted an explanatory note to accompany Roetsky’s data.

Roetsky, besides his investigations near Kolyvan, also examined another site further south – near the village of Kryvoščékovo. In Mikhailovsky’s explanatory note attached to the bridge‑pier design that Roetsky prepared for this location, it was written that “the bridge would be 360 sazhen shorter, which, at a cost of 8,000 rubles per sazhen of bridge, would save up to 3 million rubles.”[2]

Later, Nikolai Mikhailovsky explained his decision as follows:

   “On a 160‑verst stretch this is the only place where the Ob, as the peasants say, is ‘in a pipe.’ In other words, both banks and the riverbed are rocky here. Moreover, this is the narrowest part of the floodplain: at Kolyvan the river expands 12 verst during a flood, whereas here it widens only 400 sazhen.”[3]

At the end of August 1891, a field meeting was held in the village of Bol’shoye Kryvoščékovo. Three senior imperial officials took part: Konstantin Mikhaylovsky, head of the Railway Construction Administration for the West‑Siberian section; General Vladimir Berezin (future contractor); and Vikentiy Roetsky, commander of the survey team. They examined the hydrographic data presented by Roetsky on‑site and made the final decision to recommend the crossing at the local cattle ford. This set the location for the first railway bridge over the Ob in the Kryvoščékovo area.

== Construction and initial design ==
The bridge spanning the Ob River near the village of Krivoščekovo at the 1,328‑km mark of the West Siberian Railway was built according to a project by Professor Nikolai Belelubsky, a distinguished construction engineer and scholar of building mechanics.

The structure consists of 9 spans. Each span rests on stone piers made of locally quarried granite, which were set on a granite bedrock foundation in the river channel.

In the superstructure, Beleleubskiy employed semi‑parabolic trusses with a vertical support column and a single curved lower chord, arranged in a double‑braced lattice system. The double‑braced configuration provides high rigidity, shortens the length of each panel, and reduces the overall weight of the bridge components. The presence of the vertical support column simplifies the design of the bearing assembly and the supporting frame, making it easier to connect the transverse bearing beams to the trusses.

In addition, Beleleubskiy introduced a refinement known in bridge engineering worldwide as the "Russian system": a "free‑moving deck" that allows the roadway (or railway) to expand and contract independently of the main truss—an innovation that later became a standard feature in many long‑span bridges.

The steel members of the bridge trusses, with a total mass of 4,423 tonnes (≈ 270 thousand poods), were fabricated in the Urals at the Votkinsk Plant under the supervision of contractor‑engineer Vladimir Berezin.

Clearance: the minimum distance from the low‑water mark of the Ob to the trusses is 17.5 m (≈ 57 ft); from the flood‑level mark it is 9.5 m (≈ 31 ft). Construction period: four years, at a cost of about 2 million Roubles (the late‑19th‑century Russian currency, roughly equivalent to several hundred thousand U.S. dollars at the time). Overall length: 372.5 sazhen (≈ 795 m or 2,608 ft, just under 0.5 mile), composed of nine spans.

- Spans I and VII: 98.84 m (≈ 324 ft) each
- Spans II, IV, and VI: 114.48 m (≈ 376 ft) each
- Spans III and V: 113.40 m (≈ 372 ft) each
- The distances between the outermost piers and the abutment retaining walls are 21.34 m (≈ 70 ft) each.

All piers are stone, set on granite bedrock. Except for pier I (on the right bank), each pier rests on a caisson sunk to depths ranging from 1.73 m to 7.25 m (≈ 5½–24 ft) below the low‑water level. The approach embankment rises to about 15 m (≈ 49 ft) on the left bank and 10 m (≈ 33 ft) on the right bank.

In 1896 the bridge underwent load testing, during which four locomotives crossed the structure. On 31 March 1897 the bridge was formally opened to traffic. Situated on the railway line between the Krivoščekovo station of the West Siberian Railway and the Ob station of the Middle Siberian Railway, it linked the latter to the broader national rail network (the station names reflect the period’s terminology and should not be confused with contemporary designations).

The chief construction engineer was G. M. Budagov. He later recalled his collaboration with N. G. Garin‑Mikhailovsky on the road, bridge, and station projects with gratitude:

   “The work of our witty, talented comrade Nikolai Georgievich Mikhailovsky… gave the whole life of the builders, their labor, a particularly vivid and pleasant hue.”

== Development and operation ==
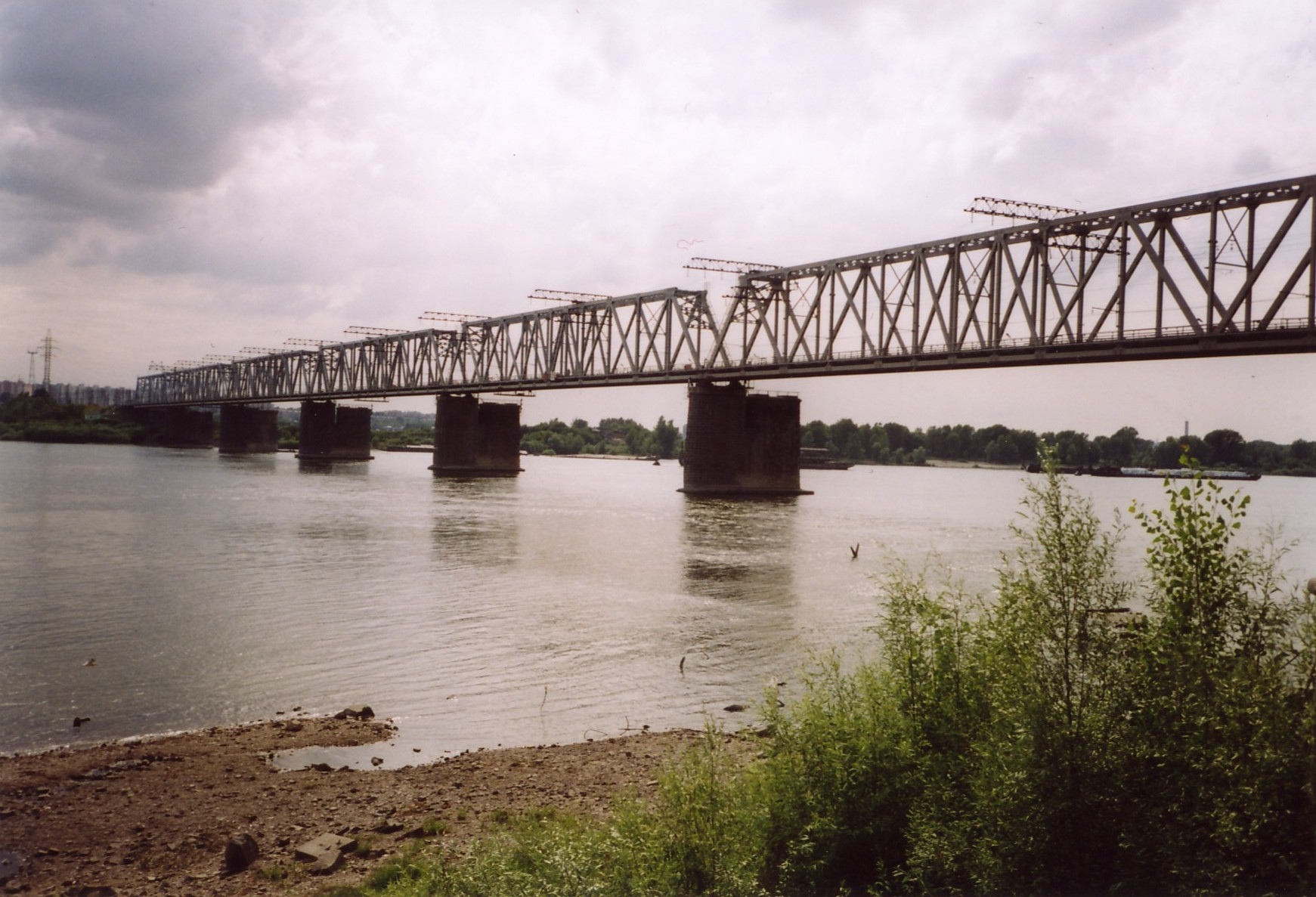
The appearance of the bridge in 2003

In the 1930s, after the completion of the two‑track Komsomol (KIM) railway bridge and the construction of a freight bypass around Novosibirsk, the "old" bridge lost its former importance and was thereafter generally used only for passenger trains passing through the city centre.

In April 1984, the second set of river‑spanning bridge girders—metal trusses—was installed on the piers of the first railway bridge over the Ob River. Bridge‑building crew No. 429—a mobile bridge‑building unit—of the West Siberian Railway erected these spans from 15.7 thousand metal components weighing a total of 4.5 thousand tonnes. Construction of the new spans had begun in 1974. For the work, the approach embankments to the bridge were washed out, receiving 78 thousand m³ of fill, and a roadway more than a kilometer long was built to the left‑bank pier to haul steel, concrete and other materials.

To verify the reliability of the existing piers, specialists from Leningrad drilled into the pier bodies and the rock foundations that supported the old bridge’s piers. Their conclusion was that the same piers could carry a second‑track superstructure. The Ministry of Railways of the USSR decided to build a new bridge while later dismantling the old superstructure, which no longer met the requirements for heavy train traffic.

A three‑ruble commemorative coin was issued for the 100‑year anniversary of the Trans‑Siberian Railway (Bank of Russia, 1994).

The design of the new bridge was prepared by the Moscow Institute of Highway and Transport Engineering (GIPROTRANSPUT). After the Novosibirsk Hydroelectric Power Station went into operation, spring ice‑breakup in the city’s vicinity ceased, eliminating the need for the "starlings" (cutwaters) that had been attached to the old bridge’s piers. Bridge engineers raised seven reinforced‑concrete piers on the foundations of the former ice‑breakers and constructed two new abutments on the banks. The installation of the truss spans between the piers—each about 100 m (≈ 328 ft) long—was carried out by a hanging‑assembly method, moving from pier to pier with cranes that traveled over and within the truss sections.

In 1991, traffic over the old railway bridge stopped, and demolition began in 2000. The new metal bridge was assembled using high‑strength bolts that allowed a faster erection of the superstructure. This efficient, scaffold‑free construction technique, which did not require temporary falsework or welding in place, was employed for the first time in Novosibirsk. The projected budget for the work was 8 million RUB. In terms of aesthetic qualities, the new superstructure, though more powerful and larger, does not quite match the historic charm of the old bridge, which had faithfully served the great Siberian rail line for nearly a century.

Today, the old bridge’s superstructures have been removed, and a single‑track railway line again runs across the bridge. The bridge piers and the embankments on both banks remain, allowing a future expansion back to double‑track capacity if needed. One of the original span structures has been preserved as a museum exhibit on the city’s riverside promenade in the “Gorodskoye Nachalo” (City Beginning) park.

== See also ==
- Nikolai Belelubsky
- Ufa Rail Bridge
- Trans-Siberian Railway
