= Maria Kotlyarevskaya-Kraft =

Soviet and Russian musicologist

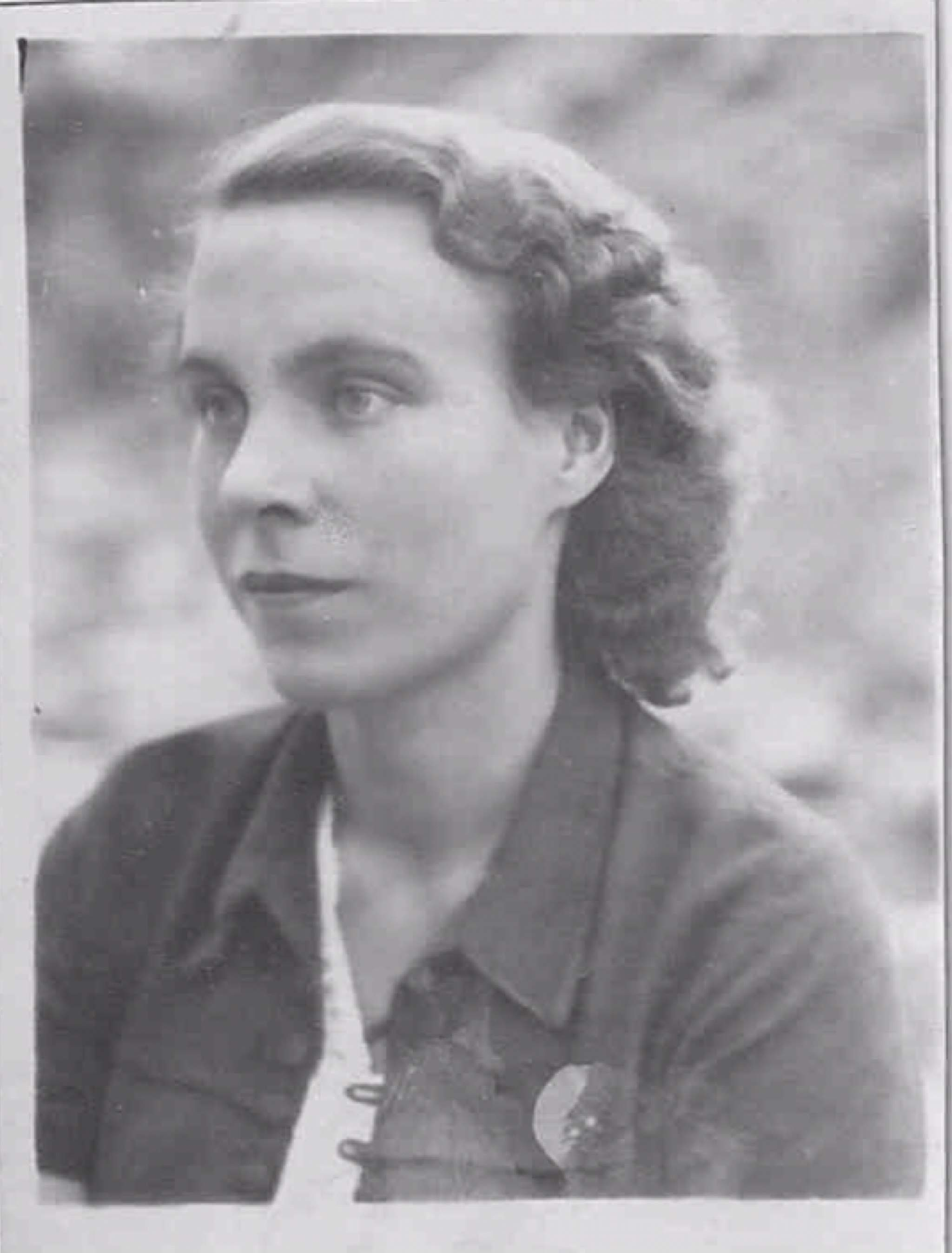
- Born: March 24, 1922; Vitebsk
- Died: August 27, 2012 (aged 90)
- Occupation(s): Musicologist, pedagogue

Maria Alexeevna Kotlyarevskaya-Kraft (Russian: Мария Алексеевна Котляревская-Крафт; March 24, 1922 – August 28, 2012) was a Soviet and Russian musicologist, pedagogue, enlightener and Honored Worker of Culture of the Russian Federation.

== Biography ==
The musician was born on March 24, 1922, in Vitebsk (modern Belarus). Her father A. F. Shtein was a hereditary musician and one of the founders of musical education in Novosibirsk and her mother T. M. Kotlyarevskaya was a pianist.

In 1952, she graduated from the Tashkent Conservatory.

Kotlyarevskaya-Kraft died on August 27, 2012 and was buried at the Zayeltsovskoye Cemetery.

== Pedagogical activity ==
Kotlyarevskaya-Kraft was a teacher of music theory and solfeggio at the Children's Music School No. 1 (Novosibirsk) and Novosibirsk Musical College.

Her methodology has become the educational basis for more than one generation of novice musicians.

She was a supporter of the relative solmization method.

Kotlyarevskaya summarized her pedagogical experience in a monograph based on lectures for students of Novosibirsk Musical College and children's music teachers from other cities of Russia.

== Works ==
- Сольфеджио для подготовительного, 1—6 кл. ДМШ
- Приглашение к творчеству. Новосибирск, 1987
- Промолчать не смогу... Затронуть струны детской души. Новосибирск: РНД, 2000
