= Nikolai Belelubsky =

Russian scientist and engineer

Nikolai Apollonovich Belelubsky
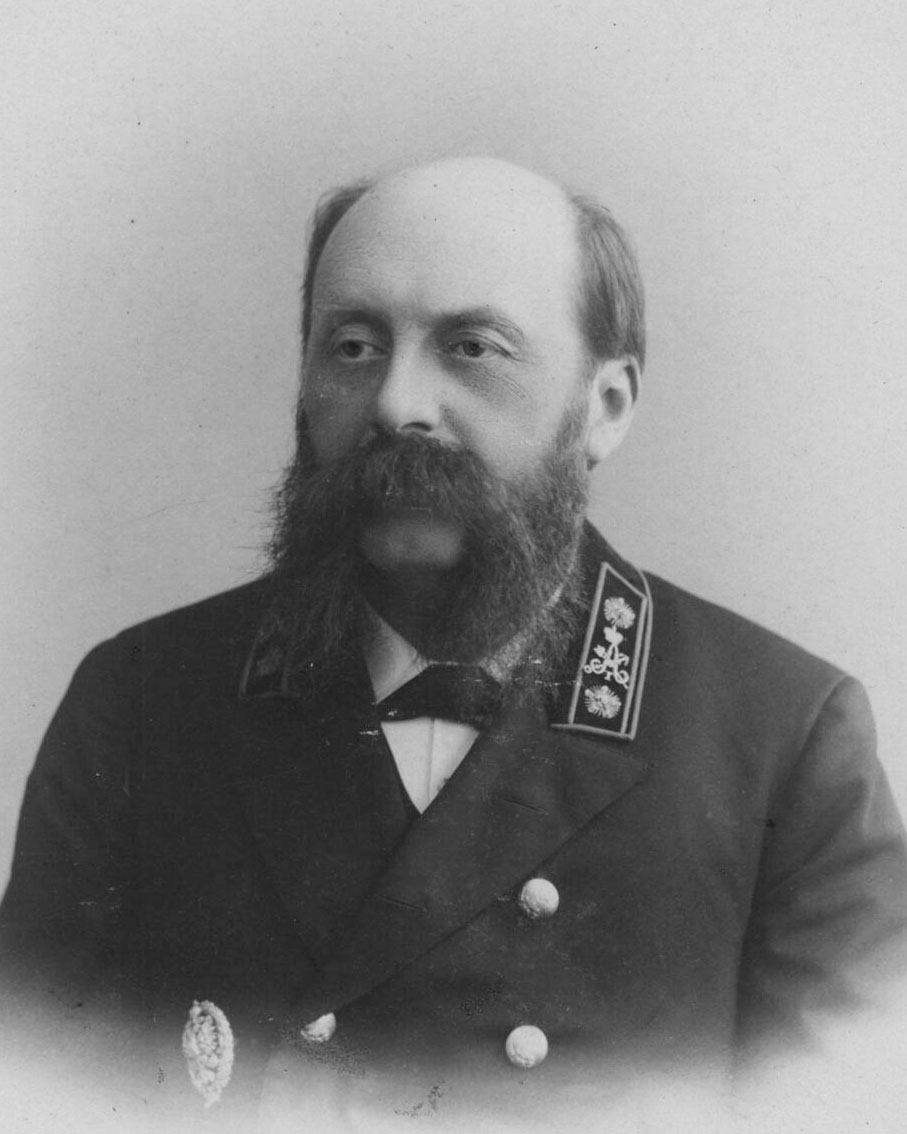
- Born: 1 March [O.S. 13 March] 1845; Kharkov Governorate, Russian Empire
- Died: August 4, 1922; Petrograd, Russian SFSR
- Occupations: Academic, engineer

Nikolai Apollonovich Belelubsky (Russian: Николай Аполлонович Белелюбский; Ukrainian: Микола Аполлонович Бєлелюбський, romanized: Mykola Apollonovych Bieleliubskyi; 1 [O.S. 13] March 1845, Kharkiv – August 4, 1922, Petrograd) was a distinguished Russian academic specialising in railway and civil engineering. Throughout his life, he became a member of many learned societies and the author of many papers and lectures.

== Early life ==
Nikolai Belelubsky was born on March 1 (13), 1845, in Kharkiv into a noble Russian family with roots dating back to the 16th century. Although his family was not affluent, he spent his childhood and youth in Taganrog, where he graduated with a gold medal from the Taganrog Boys Gymnasium in 1862. That same year, he enrolled in the Institute of Transport (now known as St. Petersburg State Transport University), from which he graduated in 1867. Belelubsky was regarded as one of the Institute's most distinguished graduates. Following his graduation, he continued to work at the Institute as a private tutor.

He developed a keen interest in science, particularly in bridge construction. In 1873, he was appointed as an Extraordinary Professor in the Department of Building Materials, and just three years later, he attained the position of Full Professor. He gained international recognition for his research and contributions to the fields of bridge engineering and building materials. In 1881, Belelubsky became a member of the Engineering Council of the Ministry of Transport and Communications.

== Bridge builder ==
Belelubsky personally designed and managed over 100 projects, including steel railway bridges spanning the rivers Don, Danube, Volga, Ob, Kama, Oka, Neva, Irtysh, Belaya, Ufa, Neman, Berezina, and many others. The total length of the bridges constructed from his designs extends to 17 kilometers (56,000 feet).

In 1875, Belelubsky designed the Alexander Railway Bridge in collaboration with Vladimir Ilyich Berezin and Konstantin Yakovlevich Mikhailovsky. The bridge was constructed on the Samara-Zlatoust Railway, spanning the Volga River near the city of Syzran. During the project, Belelubsky developed a method for analyzing clear headroom for large bridges, which later gained widespread recognition. Completed in 1880, the bridge became the longest in Europe, measuring a total length of 1,483 meters (4,865 feet). Its superstructure consisted of 13 spans, each measuring 107 meters (351 feet) long. The bridge provided a vital connection between Central Russia and the Volga region, facilitating the continued construction of the Trans-Siberian Railway further east toward Siberia and Turkestan. The construction involved approximately 2,500 workers, required more than 10,000 cubic meters of masonry, and utilized approximately 6.5 tons of iron. Furthermore, Belelubsky personally sourced iron from Belgium, insisting on the highest quality metal. (In 2004, the original spans were replaced with modern ones).

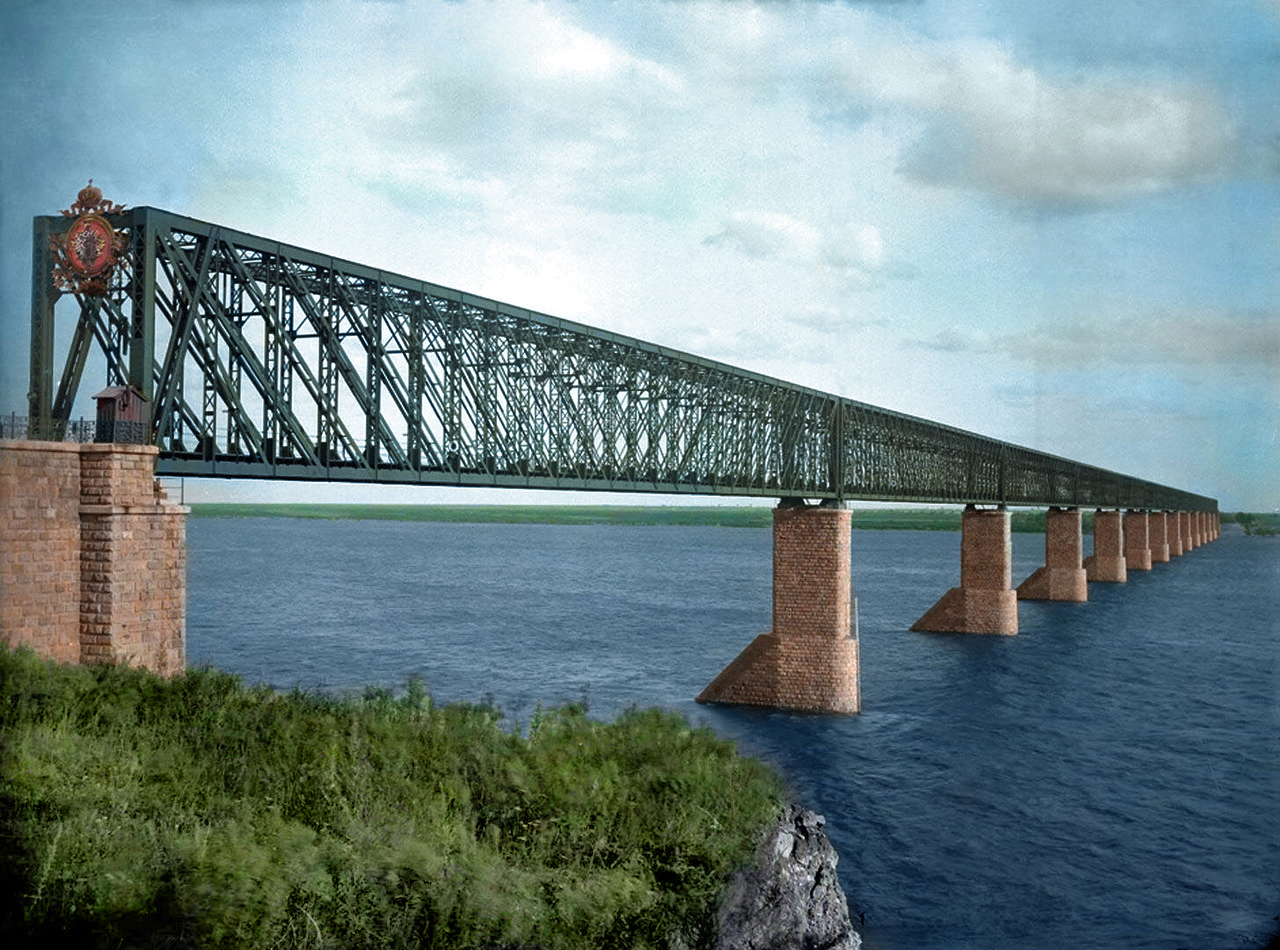
The famous Alexander railway bridge across the Volga-river. Opened for traffic on 30 August 1880

In the period from 1881 to 1884, a two-level rail bridge over the Dnieper River in Ekaterinoslav was constructed according to the design of Belelubsky. The lower level was intended exclusively for trains, while the upper level accommodated horse-drawn vehicles and pedestrians. The bridge spanned a length of 832 meters (2,730 feet). It underwent significant strengthening and renovation from the 1930s to the 1950s.

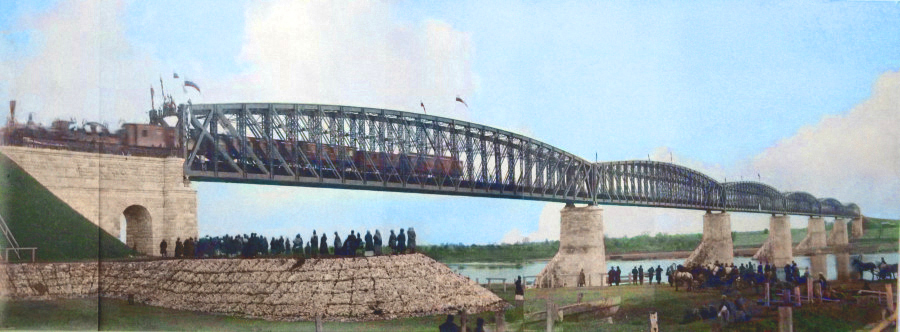
Ufa rail bridge. The official opening ceremony, 8 September 1888.

Belelubsky was an exceptional experimentalist whose contributions to the field of building materials research were marked by two significant discoveries that had a profound and lasting impact. Firstly, he demonstrated that domestically produced cement was as effective as English cement, resulting in substantial cost reductions in bridge construction. Secondly, Belelubsky made groundbreaking advancements in understanding the mechanical properties of carbon steel. In 1882, he became the first in Russia to propose the use of steel in the construction of railroad bridges. At that time, steel had not yet been systematically utilized for metal bridges in Austria, while in Germany, its use was approached with caution, adhering to the technical requirements of the era. After evaluating the physical and chemical properties of carbon steel, Belelubsky concluded that, contrary to contemporary beliefs, it was a far more reliable material for bridges than wrought iron, which was the prevailing choice. His breakthrough enabled him to successfully replace wrought iron with steel in the construction of bridges along the four major sections of the Trans-Siberian Railway. The steel specifications developed by Belelubsky laid the groundwork for similar specifications that were later adopted internationally.

When designing the bridges over the Volga river near Tver in 1885 and the Belaya River in Ufa in 1886, Belelubsky introduced a groundbreaking method known as "free carriageway", transformed traditional bridge design. This innovative technique involved integrating articulated support for the cross beams of the travel surface directly into the lower chords of the trusses within the bridge spans. By doing so, the structural integrity and operational efficiency of the bridges were significantly enhanced, as it effectively reduced the stress on the truss components. The success and recognition of this design were solidified when it was awarded the prestigious Gold Medal at the Edinburg Exposition in 1890. The system's functional features garnered immediate attention, ultimately earning global recognition as the "Russian type of structural support.

Between 1893 and 1897, Belelubsky was commissioned to design a railway bridge over the Ob River near Novo-Nikolaevsk (now Novosibirsk). This bridge served as a crucial link between the two largest segments of the Great Siberian Way—the West Siberian and Middle Siberian Railways—by spanning the intervening rivers. Notably, it was the first bridge in Russia to feature a cantilever-beam truss superstructure, and it became the longest bridge on the West Siberian Railway. The bridge commission, led by Belelubsky, conducted tests on the structure on March 28 (April 9) 1897, using four locomotives, each weighing 51.5 tons, simultaneously on the spans. The bridge was officially opened to traffic on April 5 (17) 1897.

The peak of his successful engineering career was marked by the construction of Romanovsky Bridge, which was built between 1909 and 1913 over the Volga river near Zelenodolsk. Following the October Revolution of 1917, the bridge underwent a name change and became known as the Red Bridge. This remarkable structure featured striking open truss bridge girders that stretched an impressive length of 160 metres (520 ft). A similar technical approach was utilized for a bridge in the city of Simbirsk. By employing this design, the engineer was able to reduce the number of spans required, resulting in six large spans and two smaller ones. On July 11, 1913, the bridge was officially opened to the public and proved to be a reliable transportation route for over 90 years, until its rehabilitation in 2006.

His last major project became the bridge at Rostov-on-Don, built in 1912-1917, which he designed in cooperation with G.P. Peredery and S. Belzetsky.

Belelubsky devised a unique approach to constructing caissons, which eventually was called the "caisson-slipper" technique. Furthermore, he dedicated a substantial amount of time to examining the characteristics of construction materials, with a particular emphasis on reinforced concrete.

Belelyubsky played a pivotal role in advancing Russian science and represented his country at numerous international exhibitions and forums. His innovative projects were showcased at various prestigious expositions, including the Paris Expositions in 1878, 1889, and 1900, the Edinburgh Exposition in 1890, and the Chicago World's Fair in 1893. He attained a high civil rank as an Active State Councillor, and his exceptional contributions were recognized internationally with an honorary doctorate from the Technische Hochschule in Charlottenburg (now Technische Universität Berlin) in 1907. Additionally, he was granted honorary memberships in the Architekten- und Ingenieur-Verein zu Berlin in 1909 and the French Society of Civil Engineers. Notably, he was a member of the International Association of Railroad Congresses and was honored with the title of honorary member in the Institute of Concrete in England.

In St. Petersburg he lived several years at Serpukhovskaya Street 4, moving in 1910 to Bronnitskaya Street 14a.

Nikolay Belelubsky died on August 4, 1922, in Saint Petersburg, and was buried in the Novodevichy Cemetery.

Belelubsky was highly regarded by his contemporaries for his refined cultural tastes and profound spiritual outlook. His modesty, selflessness, and willingness to relinquish material possessions were the defining traits of his character. Despite this, he was often perceived as a poor and eccentric individual according to the societal norms of his time. However, Belelubsky himself did not experience any emotional distress as a result of this perception. He prioritized spiritual values over material wealth and found immense joy in serving others.

== Education activities ==
Belelyubsky was actively engaged in significant educational initiatives aimed at training railway engineers throughout the country. In addition to his role at the Institute of Transportation, he dedicated his time to delivering lectures at prestigious institutions, including the Mining Institute, the Institute of Civil Engineers, the Imperial Academy of Arts, and the Women's Engineering College. Notably, his compelling lectures on Structural Mechanics, published in 1885, quickly gained widespread recognition and became the standard textbook for students, serving as a valuable resource for numerous engineers in the field.

He told his students:

"You all have an incredible opportunity to become engineers in the future. Is there anything else you could possibly desire or dream of? Your role will be to design and construct bridges that are intended to withstand the test of time, functioning effectively for a century or more. Your objective is to seek out impeccable designs, employ advanced techniques, and utilize efficient construction methods. However, it is crucial to remember that you will be responsible for overseeing your own construction projects, as you will be working on behalf of the state and serving the needs of the public. To truly be considered an engineer and a master of your craft, you must undertake the task of building with efficiency, care, frugality, solidity, and creativity. Each era presents new and valuable innovations, and it is the engineer's responsibility not only to adopt them but also to push the boundaries by advancing them to the next level. Failure to do so would result in a loss of the engineer's identity and expertise".

== Bridges ==
- Alexandrovsky Bridge on the Volga at Syzran, 1876–80
- Dnieper Bridge at Ekaterinoslav (later Dniepropetrovsk, today Dnipro, 1882–84
- Volga Bridge at Tver, 1885–87
- Belaya Bridge at Ufa, 1886–88
- Irtysh Bridge at Omsk, 1893–96
- Ob Bridge near Novosibirsk, 1893–97
- American Bridge on the Neva, 1896–97
- Rusanovsky Bridge at Kiev, 1904-0
- Finland Bridge on the Neva, 1910–12
- Romanovsky Bridge at Zelenodolsk (collapsed during construction 22 November 1911), 1910–13
- Don Bridge at Rostov-on-Don, 1912–17

== See also ==
- Ufa Rail Bridge
- The first railway bridge over the Ob River
- The American Bridge
- Nikolai Garin-Mikhailovsky
- Konstantin Mikhaylovsky
- Lavr Proskouriakov
- Nikolai Tikhomirov
