= Ufa Rail Bridge =

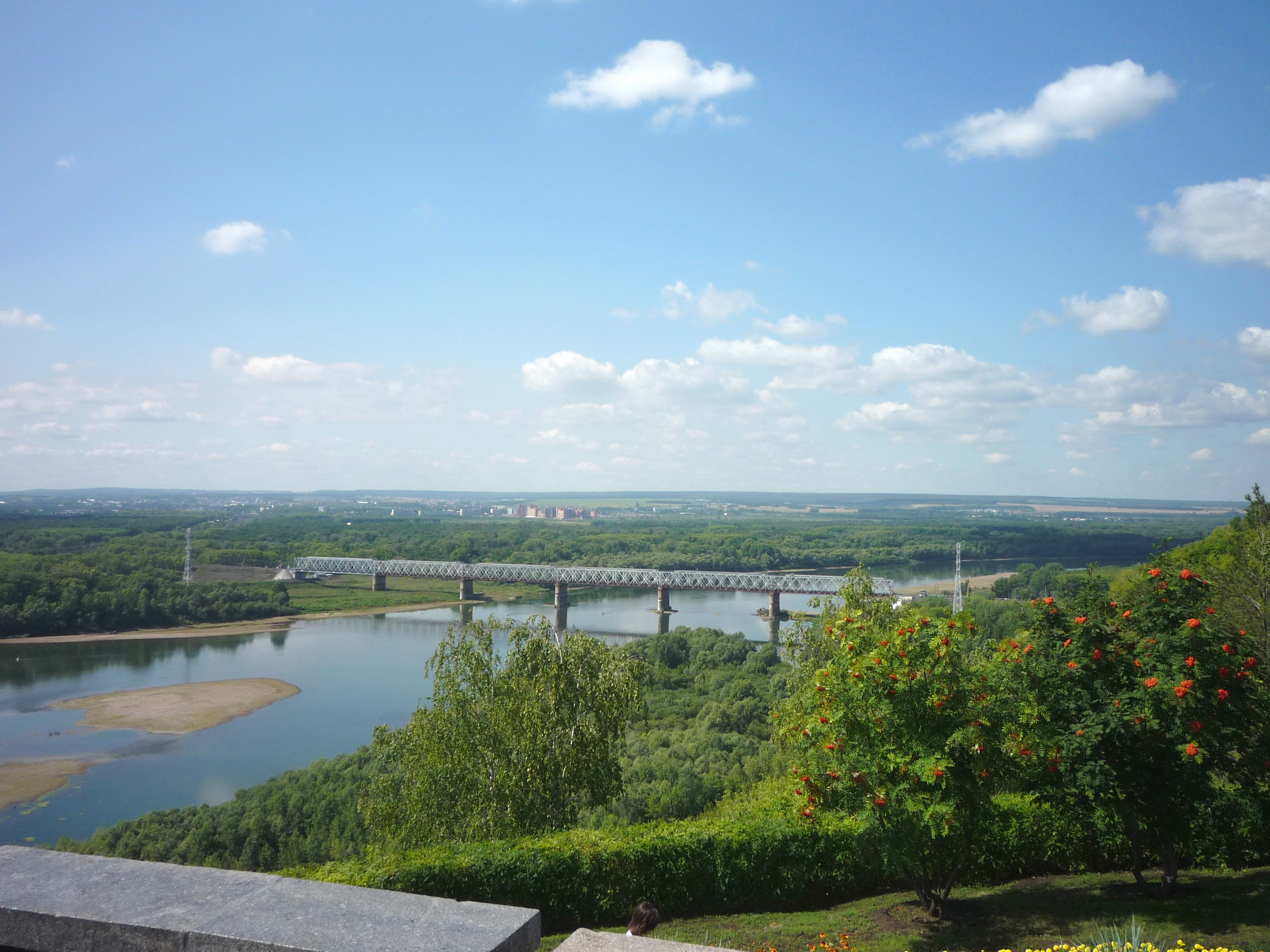
- Coordinates: 54.7182°N 55.9079°E
- Carries: Originally single track it was later widened to double track.
- Crosses: Belaya river
- Locale: Ufa, Republic of Bashkortostan, Russia

Characteristics
- Material: Steel, reinforced concrete, stone
- Total length: 655.5 m (2,151 ft)
- No. of spans: 6х109.25 m (358.4 ft)

History
- Designer: Nikolai Belelubsky
- Construction start: 1886
- Construction end: 1888
- Opened: September 8, 1888

Location
- Interactive map of Ufa Rail Bridge

Constr

Ufa rail bridge (also known as the Dema rail bridge) carries double-tracked rail lines over the Belaya River. It is located in Ufa, Republic of Bashkortostan, Russia.

== History ==
Constructed between 1886 and 1888, the bridge was designed by professor Nikolai Belelyubsky and built under the supervision of engineer Vladimir Berezin. The structure established a permanent rail crossing over the river as part of the Samara–Ufa Railway, which enabled the railway's subsequent eastward expansion towards Chelyabinsk.

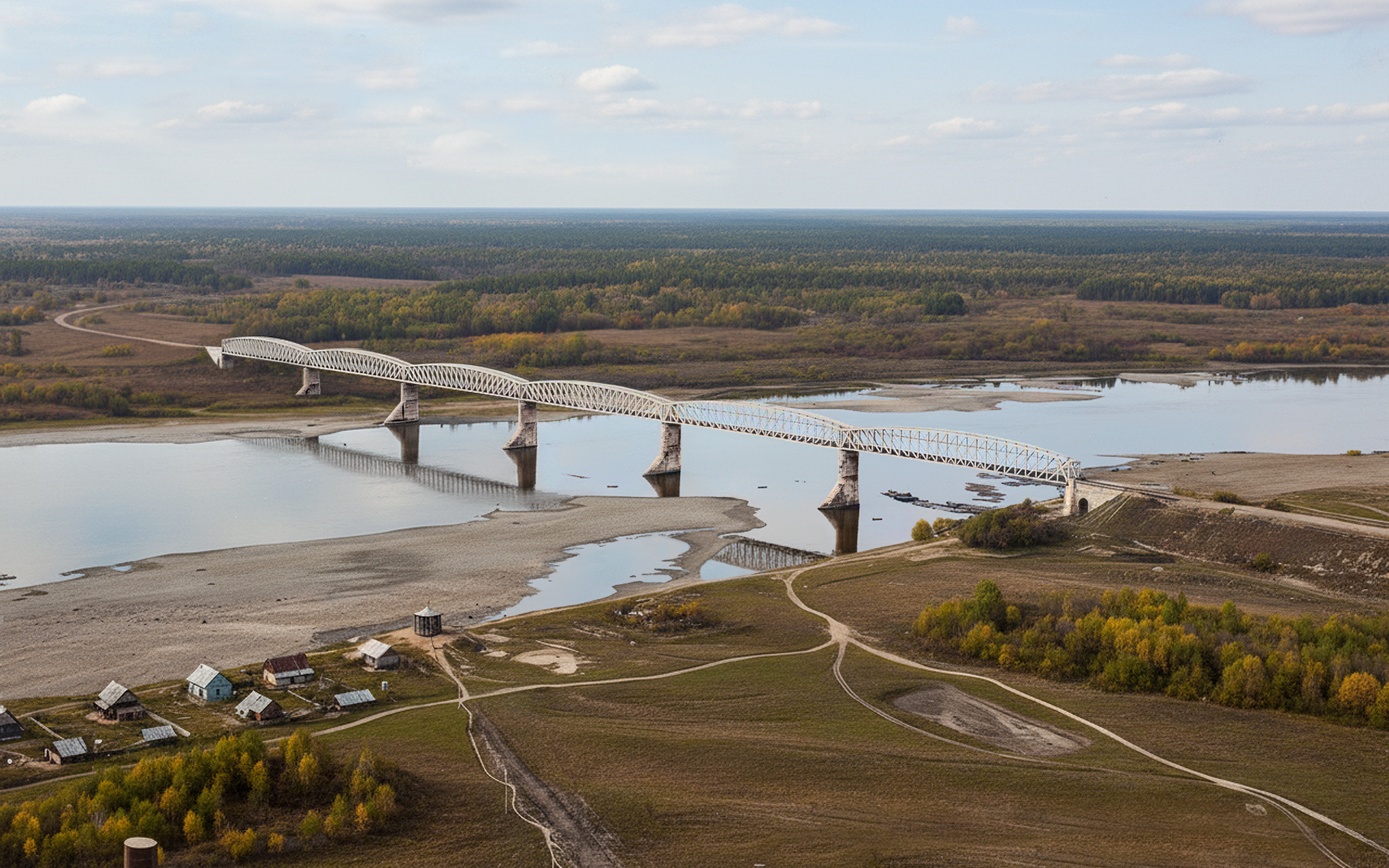
A view of the Ufa Rail Bridge in 1915

== Design Philosophy and Materials ==
The structure was built according to the design of Nikolai Belelyubsky, a Russian engineer and professor at St. Petersburg State Transport University. Vladimir Berezin served as the chief engineer, with geodetic support provided by Nikolai Boguslavsky. By the time of the design, Belelyubsky had accumulated two decades of experience in bridge construction and utilized advanced railway engineering standards.

Among Belelyubsky’s most significant contributions was the "free-moving deck," also known as the "Russian system." This innovation allowed the roadway to expand and contract independently of the main truss, addressing challenges related to thermal expansion and structural stress in long-span bridges.

The design implemented hinged connections for the transverse floor beams resting on the chords of the main trusses, allowing the deck to move independently while maintaining the stability of the main truss structure. Each end of the beam rests on a pivoting support, allowing for slight rotation under thermal expansion or load, which relieves secondary stresses within the truss members.

This innovation:

- prevented stress accumulation by accommodating thermal expansion.
- improved durability by reducing wear on fixed connections.
- enhanced load distribution, making long-span bridges safer and more efficient.

=== Technical Regulations and Materials ===
The bridge was constructed in strict accordance with the Technical Regulations for Railway Bridges introduced in 1884. These regulations stipulated standardized limits on axle loads, span lengths, and material quality control.

==== Transition to Mild Steel ====
While bridge construction in the Russian Empire during the 1880s heavily relied on puddled iron, Belelyubsky advocated for the widespread adoption of structural mild steel (historically referred to in Russia as "cast steel", which was metallurgically equivalent to open-hearth mild steel). His extensive load and fatigue testing demonstrated that mild steel possessed a superior strength-to-weight ratio and greater fatigue resistance compared to traditional puddled iron.

Despite initial institutional resistance from government ministries concerned with industrial supply chain disruptions and factory retooling costs, Belelyubsky's persistence led to the official standardization of steel profiles for Russian railway bridges.

The iron and steel components for the superstructure were fabricated at the Votkinsk Plant in Udmurtia, which had mastered open-hearth steel production for transport infrastructure.

==== Superstructure Design ====
In the superstructure, Belelyubsky employed semi-parabolic trusses that feature a vertical support column and a single, curved lower chord, arranged within a double-braced lattice system. This double-braced configuration delivers high rigidity, shortens the length of each truss panel, and reduces the overall weight of the bridge components. The vertical column simplifies the bearing assembly and the support frame, making it easier to connect the transverse bearing beams to the trusses.

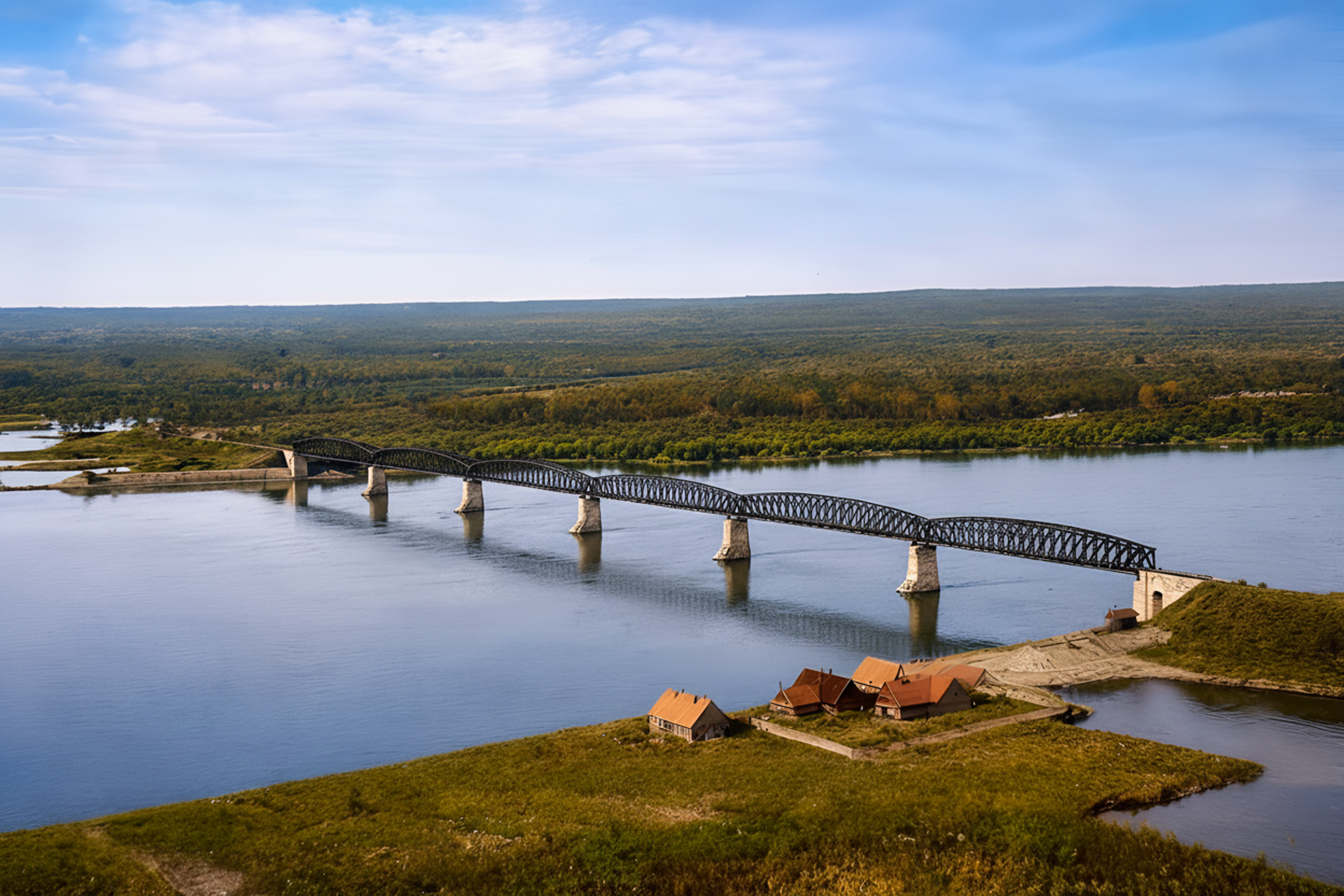
The Ufa Railway Bridge during the annual spring flood, the end of 19 century

==== Early Adoption of Reinforced Concrete ====
Belelyubsky, recognizing the potential of reinforced concrete in the 1880s, advocated for its use in abutments and ancillary structures to enhance structural stability and reduce the reliance on traditional stone masonry.

==== Structural Layout ====
The bridge consists of six identical spans, each 109.25 m long, resting on massive masonry piers. To protect the piers against hydrodynamic forces, the bridge was fitted with large starlings (cutwaters) positioned upstream. This design effectively broke up ice flows during the annual spring thaw.

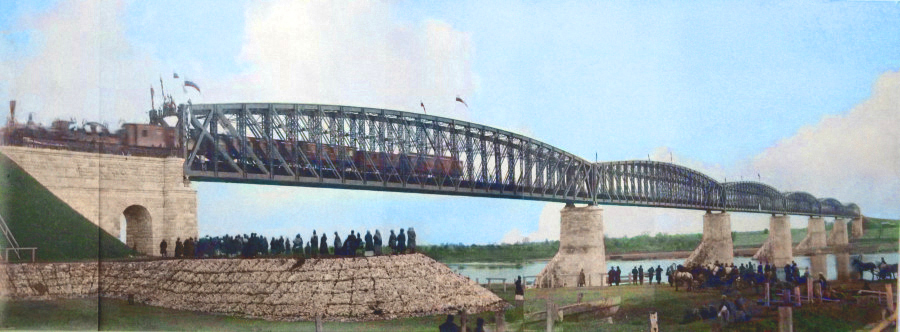
The Opening Ceremony

== Inauguration ==
On September 8, 1888, Admiral Konstantin Posyet, Minister of Railways, ceremonially cut a silk ribbon stretched between the bridge's trusses. The inaugural train then proceeded onto the newly opened Ufa railway station. Initially, the bridge provided pedestrian access on its side decks, separating foot traffic from the railway. However, this access was later restricted due to safety and operational concerns.

== Recognition and Impact ==
The design of the bridge was regarded as progressive because it reduced additional stresses in the truss members. At the 1890 International Exhibition of Science, Art & Industry, this construction method received a Gold Medal and later entered worldwide bridge‑building practice as the "Russian system."

== War Damage and Emergency Reconstruction (1919) ==
During the Russian Civil War, the sixth span of the bridge was destroyed by the White Army under Kolchak’s command. The 61,050-pood (approximately 1,000-ton) steel truss was partially dislodged, with one end dropping into the river while the other end remained on the pier, rendering the structure unusable.

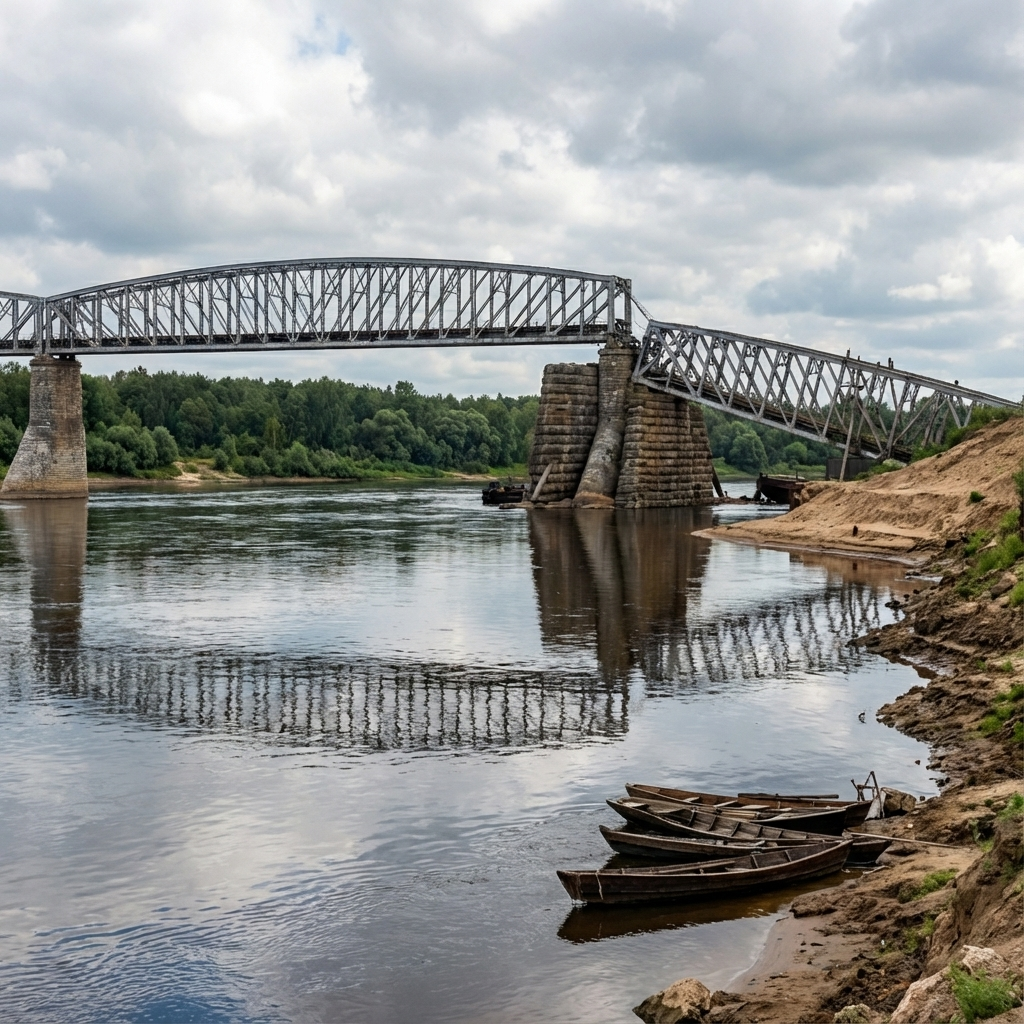
The collapsed section in June 1919

=== Two‑Stage Restoration ===
- Temporary Bypass (June 1919): Engineers erected a temporary detour bridge. This involved lifting the surviving portion of the original truss and installing a 23-meter (75-foot) temporary span along with a 25-meter (82-foot) approach viaduct. Trains began using this temporary structure ahead of schedule. Vladimir Lenin sent a congratulatory telegram to the bridge-building crew on October 10, 1919.
- Permanent Replacement (October 1919): Once the temporary bridge was removed, a new permanent span, designed by Professor Lavr Proskuryakov according to the 1907 Technical Regulations for Railway Bridges, was installed. The design prioritized minimizing interruption to rail traffic. Winches shifted the temporary spans onto separate supports in seven hours, and the new permanent truss was lifted onto the piers in 3 hours and 45 minutes.

== Operational Restrictions (Interwar Period) ==
An inspection card for the bridge from 1928, preserved at the Ufa railway division, documents specific operational restrictions implemented during the interwar period:

“Trains equipped with a pair of E-type locomotives, as well as any train carrying American-style half-wagons, are prohibited from crossing this bridge. When a single E-type locomotive crosses, its speed must not exceed 8 km/h (5 mph).”

The axial line load of a Series E steam locomotive on the bridge spans was approximately 7.0 tonnes per meter (t/m), whereas a double-unit VL10 electric locomotive exerts a lower linear load of approximately 5.6 t/m due to its greater length. The 1928 directives restricted double-headed Series E locomotives to prevent the total linear load from exceeding the structural limits established by the 1884 design regulations.

American-style four-axle gondola wagons were restricted because their axle load when fully loaded reached up to 22 tonnes, resulting in a linear load of roughly 7.5 to 8.0 t/m. This exceeded the bridge's permissible capacity, which had been engineered for lighter two-axle freight cars with a 12.5-tonne axle limit. To transport such freight across the river, operators had to redistribute the cargo into standard lighter wagons or reduce the loading gauge to meet the bridge's structural constraints.

== Subsequent Strengthening Campaigns ==
The bridge was repeatedly reinforced and rebuilt throughout the twentieth century to accommodate increasing traffic. Between 1937 and 1939, the bridge spans were reinforced to support larger locomotives. Modifications, including the addition of structural steel reinforcements, increased the spans’ weight by approximately 4% while maintaining compliance with operational clearance standards.

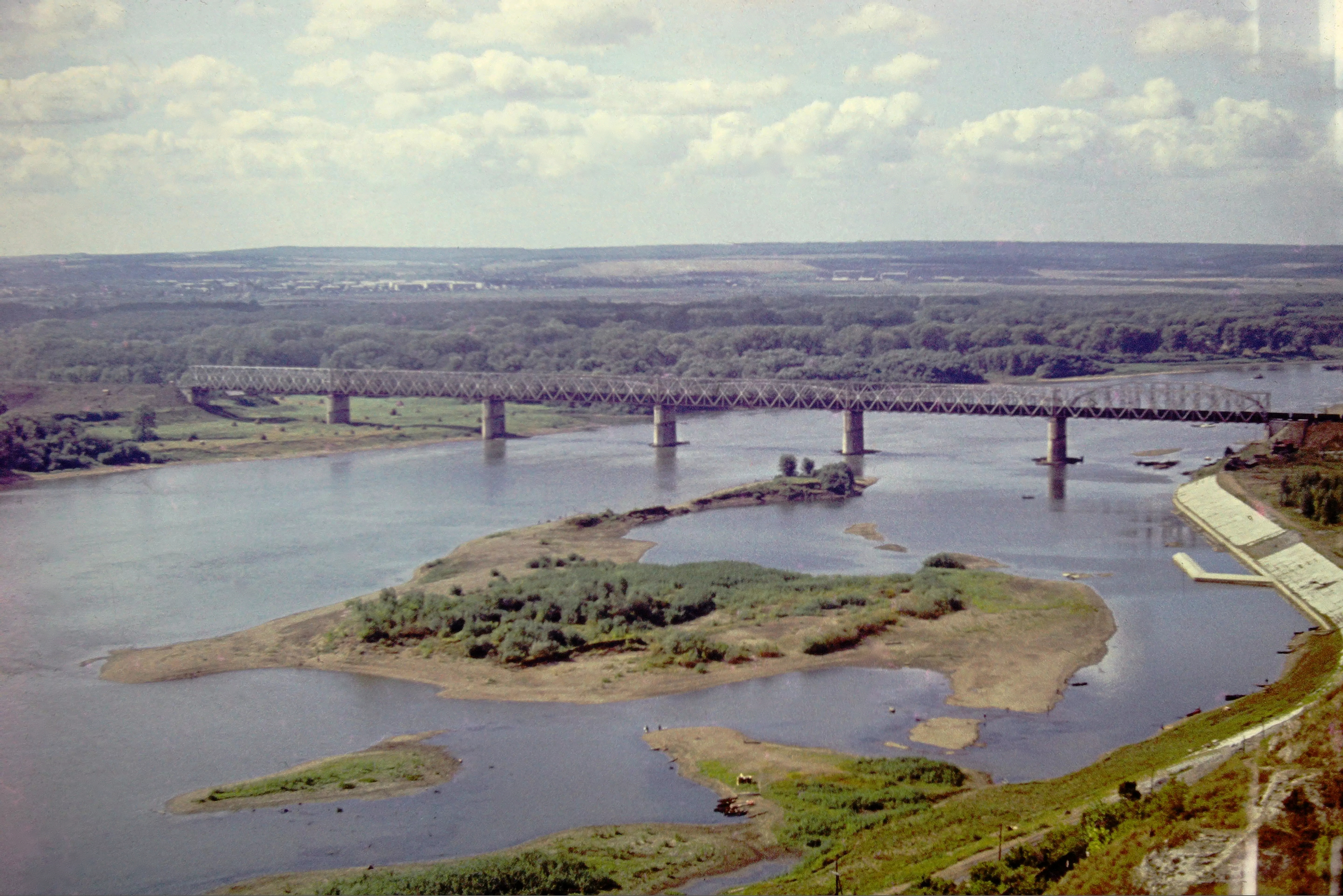
A photo of the Ufa Railroad Bridge in the 1970s, still with its distinctive "humpbacked" span, designed by Lavr Proskuryakov

Between 1949 and 1951, Construction Train No. 417 (a specialized mobile engineering unit) performed reconstruction work. The team erected new reinforced-concrete pylons for the second track on the original cutwater footings and installed a new superstructure with standardized trusses designed to the Soviet N-7 load class specifications introduced by ProektStalKonstruktsiya in 1943. This standard corresponds to an approximate 30-tonne axle load limit.

Between 1991 and 2001, the bridge underwent further modernization, during which the remaining original 1888 spans were replaced with new structures compliant with the Russian S-14 load class specifications. This upgrade allows for higher axle loads and supports modern intermodal freight rail traffic across the river.

== The Bridge over the Ufa River ==
The double-track railway bridge spanning the Ufa River near Shaksha Station is a three-span structure, with each span measuring 109 m. Designed by Nikolai Belelyubsky, it was built according to the 1884 construction standards and mirrors the structural layout of the bridge over the Belaya River.

The Bridge over the Ufa River

On June 9, 1919, during the Ufa Operation of the Russian Civil War, retreating forces of the White Army destroyed the bridge's third span. The destruction occurred when artillery fire detonated railcars loaded with explosives that had been positioned on the span.

Reconstruction took place in two stages: first, temporary wooden spans were installed, followed by a permanent repair in 1920. The new steel span was designed by Professor Lavr Proskuryakov in accordance with the 1907 Technical Regulations for Railway Bridges.

In 1939–1940, the bridge spans were reinforced to support larger locomotives. Modifications, including the addition of structural steel reinforcements, increased the spans' weight by approximately 4% while maintaining compliance with operational clearance standards.

In 1951–1952, Construction Train No. 414 reconstructed the bridge, erecting reinforced-concrete pylons on the original cutwater footings and installing new spans for the second track in accordance with the N-7 load class standards.

Between December 2001 and 2002, the bridge underwent major modernization. The historical pre-revolutionary spans were replaced with modern metal structures compliant with the Russian S-14 load class standard, with construction carried out by USK MOST.

== Interesting Facts ==
- In 1888, an artificial channel was excavated for the Dema River to avoid building a second railway bridge over its course. The new cut directed the Dema directly toward the Belaya River, whereas historically it had joined the Belaya several kilometers downstream, forming a broad, shallow waterway. This artificial channel altered the local hydrography, integrating what was then an island—now the settlement of Kozorez—into the main river course.
- In 1910, Sergei Prokudin-Gorsky captured color photographs of the bridge using a three-color glass plate technique. He exposed a single glass plate three times through blue, green, and red filters. When the three monochrome images were later combined, they reconstructed the scene in full color.
- Just downstream of the bridge, a small island exists in the Belaya River that alters its shape seasonally, occasionally forming a temporary peninsula toward the right bank during low water levels. The island's origin is connected to the early 1900s, when two barges loaded with sacks of flour capsized at the site. The sunken hulls settled on the riverbed, creating a barrier that trapped river sediments, sand, and silt over subsequent decades, eventually rising above the waterline.

== See also ==
- Nikolai Belelubsky
- Lavr Proskuryakov
- Trans-Siberian Railway
