= Zayeltsovskoye Cemetery =

Zayeltsovsky City District, Novosibirsk, Russia

Coordinates: 55°05′50″N 82°52′58″E

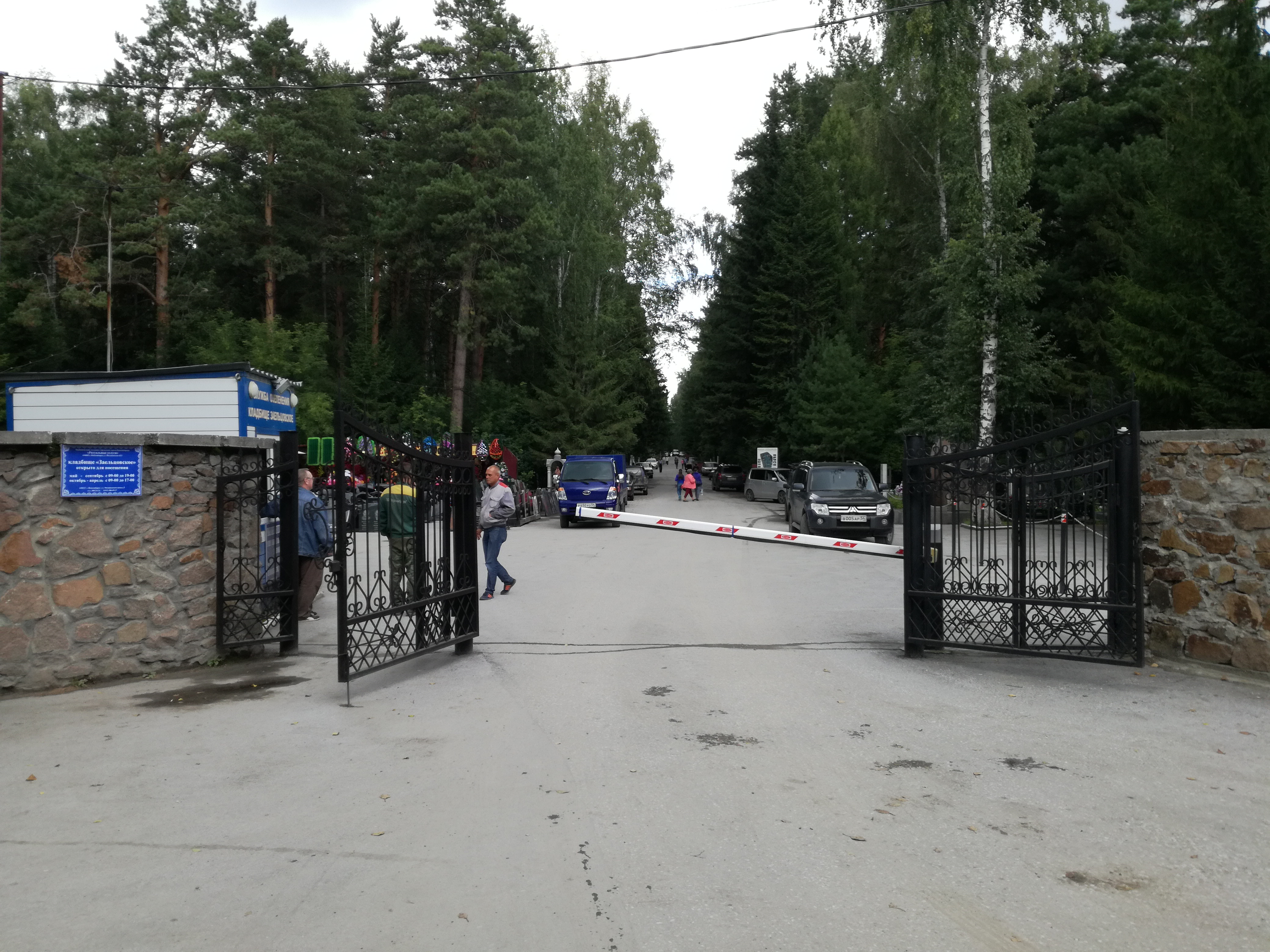

The Zayeltsovskoye Cemetery (Russian: Заельцовское кладбище) is a cemetery in the Zayeltsovsky City District of Novosibirsk, Russia. The area of the graveyard is about 200 hectares.

== Notable people buried at the Zayeltsovskoye Cemetery ==
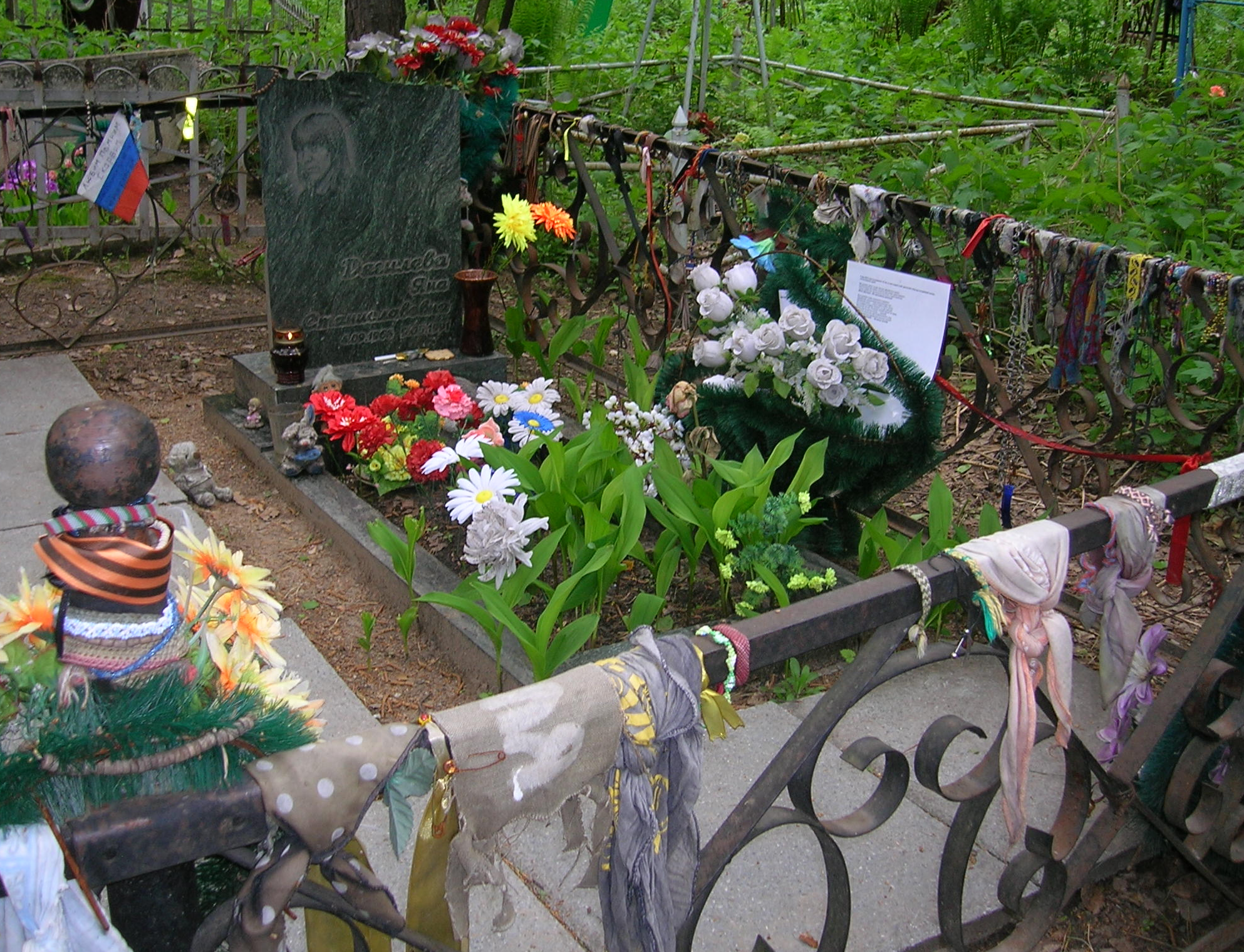
Yanka Dyagileva's grave

- Varvara Bulgakova, sister of famous Russian writer Mikhail Bulgakov
- Albert Chernenko, Russian philosopher, son of Konstantin Chernenko
- Yanka Dyagileva, Russian poet, singer-songwriter and punk rock singer
- Yuri Korshunov, Russian entomologist, scientific worker of the Zoological Museum in the Institute of Systematics and Ecology of Animals
- Ivan Sollertinsky, Russian polymath of the Soviet period
- Nikolai Tikhomirov, Russian engineer, public figure, one of the founders of Novosibirsk
