= Samara railway station =

Railway station in Samara, Russia

Samara Самара
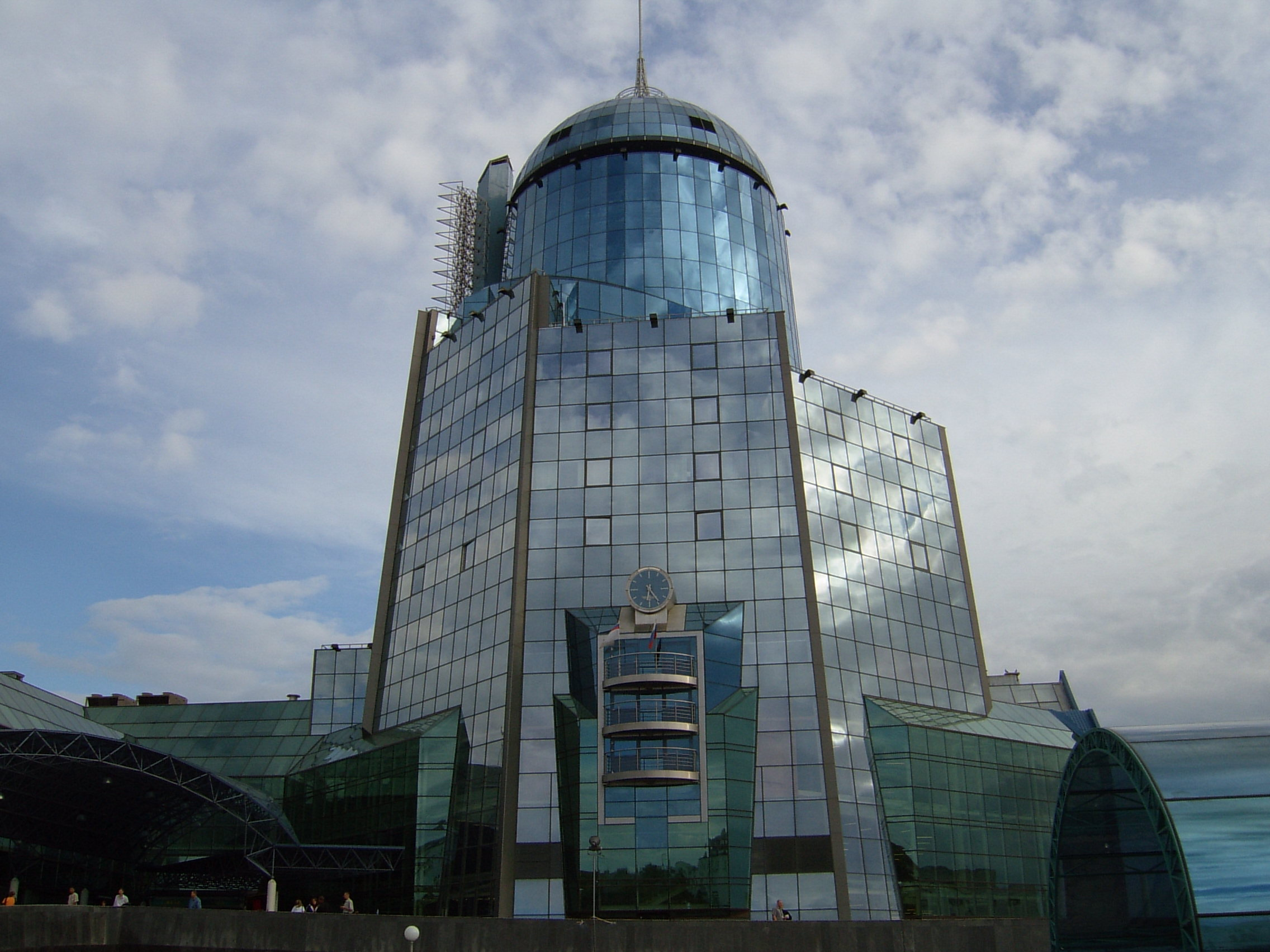
- View of the station from square

General information
- Location: Russia, Samara
- Coordinates: 53°11′9″N 50°7′15″E
- System: Kuybyshev Railway terminal
- Owner: Russian Railways (Kuybyshev Railway)
- Platforms: 8 (7 island platforms)
- Tracks: 22

Construction
- Parking: yes

Other information
- Station code: 657907
- Fare zone: 0

History
- Opened: 1876
- Former names: Kuybyshev (1935–1991)

Services
Preceding station	Kuybyshev Railway	Following station
Location

Samara-Passazhirskaya (Russian: Самара-Пассажирская) is a major railway station of the Kuybyshev Railway in Samara, Russia.

== Main information ==
The new station was built in 2001 and is the tallest station building in Europe with height including the spire 101 meters.

== History ==
The current station in Samara is the second in the history of the city. The first railway station in Samara was built in 1876, and it operated for 120 years. The total area of the old station was 3380 m^{2}, capacity.

In the summer of 1996, on the eve of Railway Workers' Day, the first brick was laid in the foundation of a new railway station. Construction work was carried out without interrupting the movement of passenger and commuter train station through the Samara at the time developed technology.

May 25, 1999, saw the opening of the first Launch Complex Station. In December 1999, a modern pedestrian tunnel was put into operation, which is over 240 sq. It links the station square with all the landing platform station.
