= American Bridge, Saint Petersburg =

The American Bridge
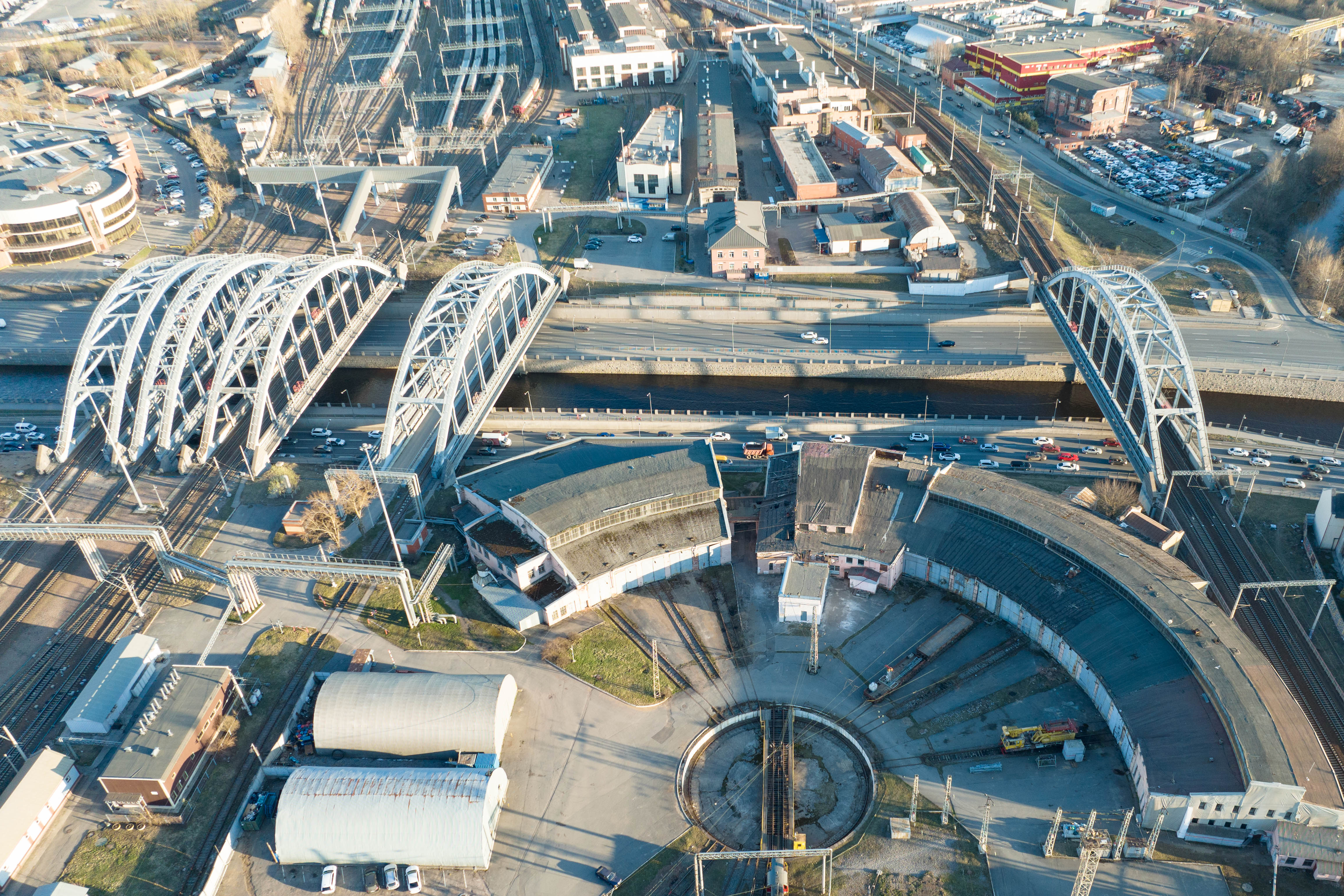
- Coordinates: 59°54′50″N 30°22′03″E
- Crosses: Obvodny Canal
- Locale: St. Petersburg, Russian Federation

Characteristics
- Total length: 983.5 m (3,227 ft)
- No. of spans: 9 х 109.25 m (358.4 ft)

History
- Designer: Nikolai Belelubsky
- Opened: 1897

Location
- Interactive map of The American Bridge

The American Bridge (also referred to as The Howe Bridges, or Nikolaev Railway Bridge until 31 December 2008) is essentially a group of railway bridges that connect the Bezymyannyi island (St. Petersburg) to the left bank of the Neva River via the Obvodny Canal, and provide links between the Central and Nevsky districts of the city of Saint Petersburg.

== History ==
The wooden bridges of the same design as now were constructed over the period 1840-1850 during the construction of the Nikolayevskaya Railway. The main construction works were supervised by the prominent American railroad engineer George W. Whistler to a design by William Howe, an American bridge builder and inventor.

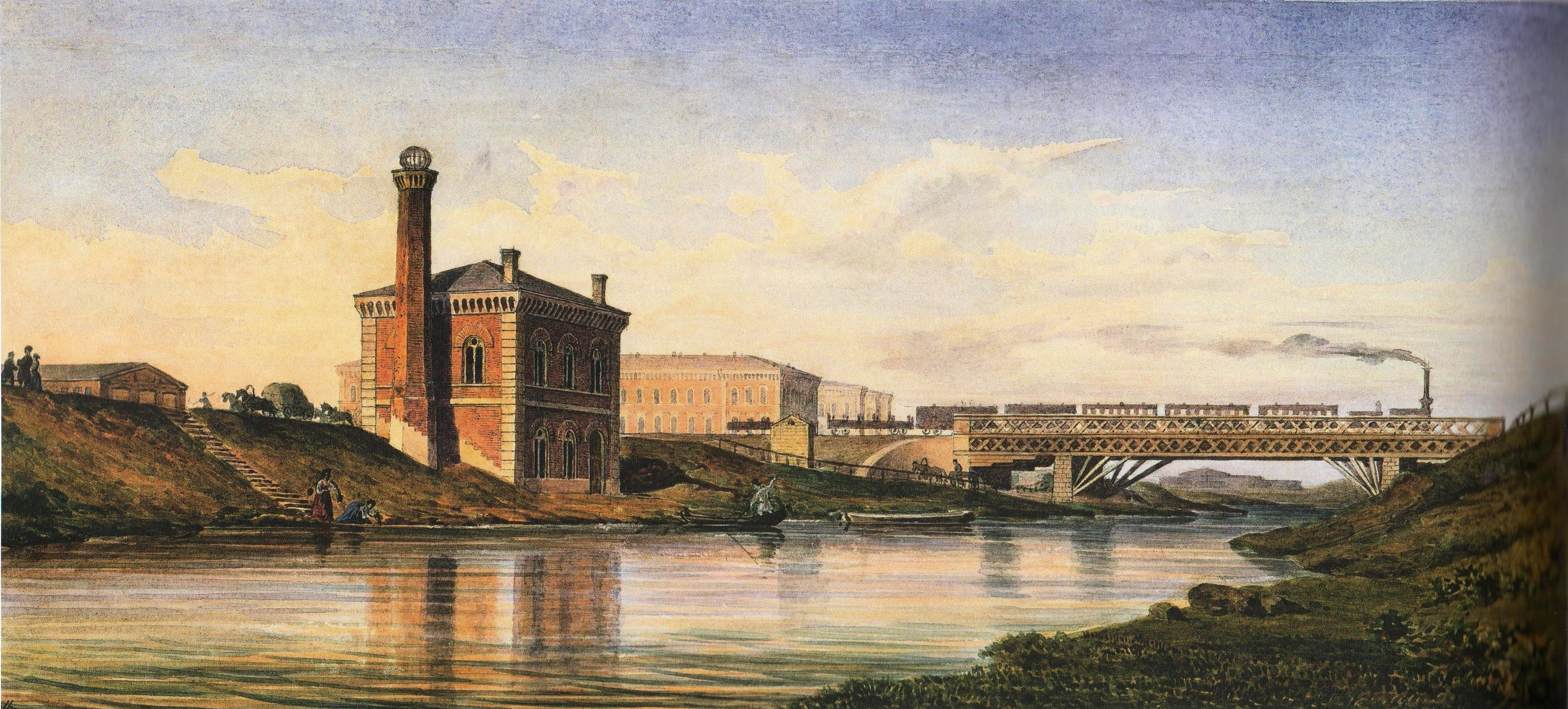
The American bridge in 1846

The essence of this construction project was that the bridge spans were a truss system (which was very new) consisting of timber support systems delimited by steel crossbars. The presence of metal components made the bridge structure much stronger without significantly increasing the overall weight.

The William Howe's system was theoretically checked and then improved by the Russian engineer Dmitrii Juravsky, who was an executive assistant to George W. Whistler during the construction of the railway line. Juravsky performed structural analyses and tests on physical models of Howe trusses from 1843 to 1848, and executed studies of the effect of posttension in Howe trusses. He published two books "About Bridges of the Howe System" in 1855 and 1856.

Juravsky was able to prove that the closer to a bridge's pillars, the greater the strain on the vertical tension bars and diagonal braces. So, he proposed to make the truss members of varying thickness depending on a specific location. His ideas were endorsed by Whistler, and then used in the construction of other rail bridges on this line. As the road was built in the forward direction, it was necessary to build 278 artificial structures.

== Metal bridges ==
The wooden bridge over the Obvodny Canal was originally constructed by George W. Whistler using the Howe-Zhuravsky system. It served its purpose effectively for approximately three decades. However, in 1869, a decision was made to replace it with new metal spans. The task of designing the new bridge was entrusted to Nikolai Belelubsky, a renowned Russian civil engineer who had successfully constructed numerous railroad bridges throughout the Russian Empire. Belelubsky showcased his exceptional talent and expertise as both a scientist and a practitioner. He managed to organize and categorize existing steel bridge designs, subsequently developing a set of standardized span structures.

Although modifications were made to the design of the wooden bridge, the resulting metal structure bore a striking resemblance to the previous truss system known as the Howe-Zhuravsky. Just like its wooden predecessor, the newly constructed steel bridge also featured a double-track configuration.

The Major yard in Saint-Petersburg saw significant advancements, leading to a steady growth in its operations. The terminal witnessed a rapid increase in both passenger and cargo traffic, which was attributed to the expansion of the rolling stock. However, a shortage of space on the left bank of the Obvodny Canal necessitated the construction of a new train maintenance depot on the right bank. Additionally, new crossings were also built to accommodate the rising demands of the station.

In 1906, a single-track American bridge, designated as bridge number 2, was constructed adjacent to the pre-existing metal bridge, which eventually became known as bridge number 1. Subsequently, in 1911, an additional rail bridge with two tracks and identified as bridge "B" was incorporated into the existing structures.

In 1913, a double-track bridge featuring the letter E was constructed. Subsequently, in 1916, another bridge was added to complete the structure, this time adorned with the letter A. The design of these bridges closely resembled the railway bridge located in Tsarskoye Selo, spanning the Obvodny Canal on the railroad track near the Vitebsky railway station.

== Name and numbering ==
Since the construction completed, the first bridge has come to be known as “American“ for its design. Later, after the other bridges were opened for traffic, this name was also applied to them.

All five bridges started to be described as "Nikolaevsky railway bridge" in the official register of the city's environment objects names (according to the former names of the Moscow Station and Oktyabrskaya Railway (or October Railway)).

However, on 31 December 2008, the bridges began to be called 'The American Bridge' by a resolution of the Government of St. Petersburg. The Government's decision was motivated by the fact that "it was referred to as American since the time it was built."

From the West to the East

- the double-track bridge with a "A" under the first and third mainlines for suburban and passenger trains;
- the single-track bridge with a "E" as a connecting track between the locomotive and car facilities of the station of Saint-Petersburg (Major yard), combined with the connecting passage (water supply, heat supply, network backbone, communication cables);
- the locomotive and wagon facilities of the station of St. Petersburg (Major), combined with the communication unit (water supply, heat supply network backbone, communication cables);
- the double-track bridge with a "B", where there are tracks connecting a storage yard to the New Park;
- the 1st American single-track bridge for passenger trains;
- the 2nd American double-track bridge, connecting the parks A-N and B-N to a freight yard and the first track.

== Renovation ==
Since 2006, the October Railway has been engaged in extensive renovation works on this bridge, which have cost a total of 4.5 billion rubles and spanned a timeframe of approximately 39 months.

The primary objectives of these renovation efforts are multi-faceted:

- there is a focus on the continuous reconstruction and modernization of the bridge itself;
- there is an aim to seamlessly integrate the bridge into the St. Petersburg-Moscow high-speed railway system;
- the project also includes the relocation of the railway's technical zone away from the city, allowing for the development of previously vacant areas.

The responsibility for carrying out this extensive renovation project lies with the company known as 'Mostostroy number 6'. They have been entrusted with the task of ensuring the successful completion of the project.

One significant milestone in this endeavor occurred on November 23, 2007, when a duplicate of the bridge, marked as 'A' and located further to the west, was officially opened for traffic. Currently, the bridge is being served by the first and third main roads leading to Moscow. According to the design plans, the old 'A' bridge is scheduled to be entirely demolished and replaced by a brand-new bridge. This new bridge, designed by the Institute LenGiproTrans, is projected to be 101.5 meters in length. Unlike its predecessor, which had six abutments and was 25 meters shorter, the new bridge will only have two abutments. Furthermore, it is anticipated that the other bridges within the project will follow the same design specifications. The construction process will involve the utilization of metal arch trusses, ensuring the durability and stability of the new structures.

The construction of the two-story building at St. Petersburg Station, which served as a control point for all signals and arrows, was almost finished by the end of 2007. However, it was decided to demolish the building and complete the construction by the end of the year. The intention was for the new crossing to replace the old bridge labeled as 'B'.

Unfortunately, in April 2008, due to disagreements between Russian Railways and the local government, as well as ongoing reconstruction work on Ligovsky Prospect, the completion date had to be rescheduled. The new timeline was set as follows: In early May, the bridge would undergo static and dynamic tests. On May 6, 2008, load tests were conducted, and only after passing these tests, the bridge was finally opened for rail traffic.
