= Syzran Bridge =

Bridge across the Volga River in Samara Oblast, Russia

Coordinates: 53°10′19″N 48°47′55″E

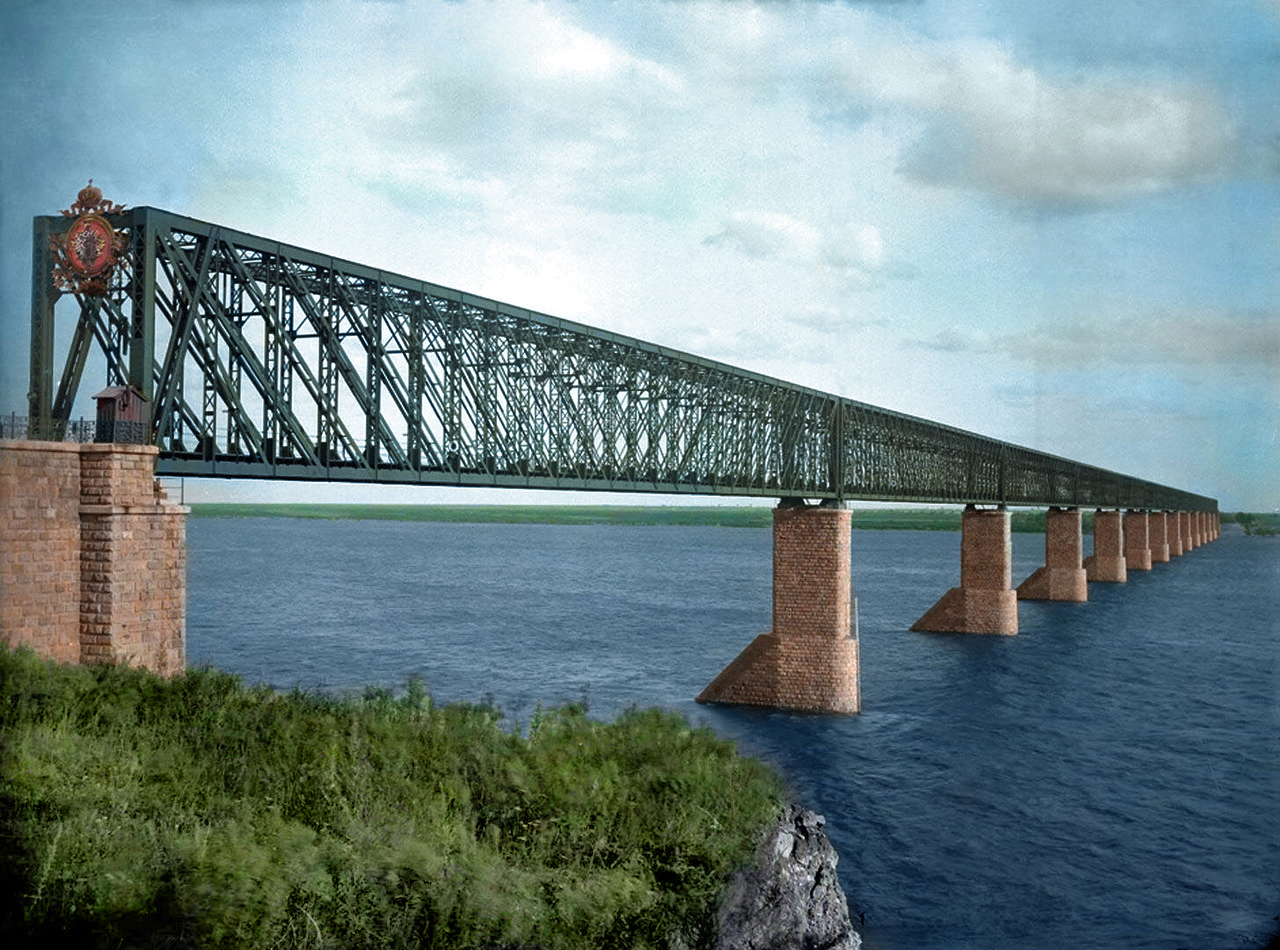
The famous Alexander Railway Bridge. Opened for traffic on August 30, 1880.

The Syzran Bridge across the Volga River near Syzran was designed by Nikolai Belelubsky and Konstantin Mikhailovsky. This remarkable engineering project was the first rail bridge ever built across the lower part of the Volga River. It was officially opened by Konstantin Posyet in 1880 as an integral component of the Samara-Zlatoust Railway.

The bridge's diagonal system consisted of 13 spans, each measuring 107 meters (351 ft) in length. It held the title of being the longest in Europe for a considerable time, with a total length of 1,483 meters (4,865 ft).

Initially, the bridge was named Alexandrovsky, in honor of the 25th anniversary of Emperor Alexander II's reign. However, following the October Revolution, it was decided to rename the bridge as Syzransky.

During the Russian Civil War in 1918, two spans of the bridge were intentionally destroyed by retreating troops of Komuch supporters, but they were promptly restored.

In 1949, the decision to create a second track on the bridge was approved, and its construction was successfully finalized in 1957.

In 1980, there was an incident involving the tanker Volgoneft 268 colliding with the bridge, resulting in minimal damage.

Following the collapse of the Soviet Union, the bridge was given back its original name, however, the additional name still persists. Consequently, the bridge is now recognized by two names, namely Alexandrovsky and Syzransky.

In 2004, a comprehensive renovation of the bridge was successfully carried out, which involved replacing the original spans with brand-new ones.

On August 27, 2010, a commemorative stele was erected to mark the 130th anniversary of the bridge's opening.
