= Kuybyshev Railway =

Subsidiary of Russian Railways

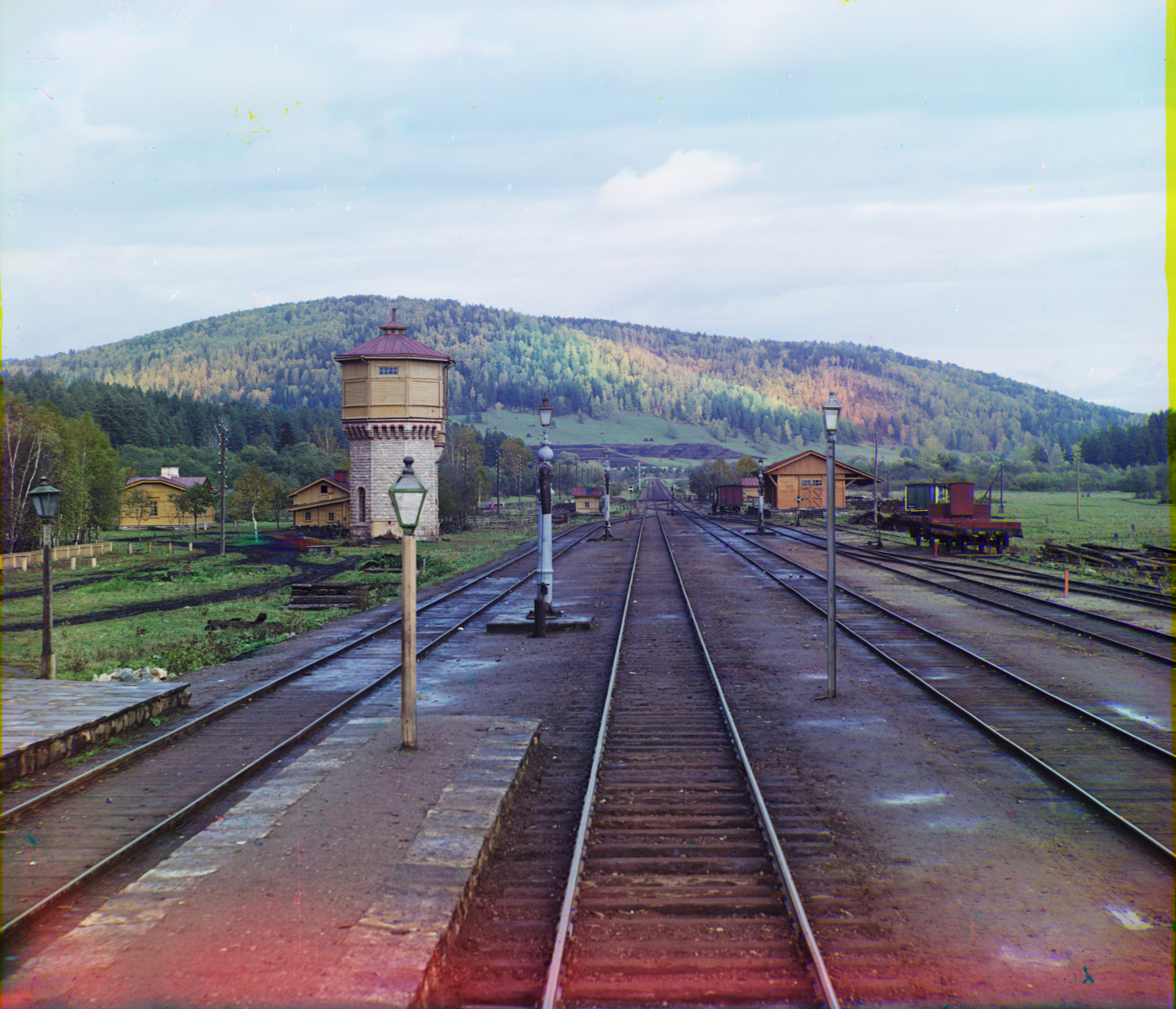
The Syzran–Zlatoust Railway. A photograph by Sergei Prokudin-Gorsky, c. 1910

The Kuybyshevskaya Railway (Ку́йбышевская желе́зная доро́га) is a subsidiary of the Russian Railways, operating in several regions of Russia, such as Tatarstan, Bashkortostan, Mordovia, Ryazan Oblast, Penza, Tambov, Ulyanovsk, Samara, Orenburg, and Chelyabinsk Oblasts of Russia. The headquarters of the railway are located in Samara, and the total length of its route is 11,502 km.

The oldest railway in the network is the one that connects Morshansk and Syzran, which was constructed between 1872 and 1875. In 1880, engineers Nikolai Belelubsky and Konstantin Mikhailovsky designed the Syzran Bridge over the Volga River, which was the longest in Europe at the time. The railway line was extended to Zlatoust in 1890 and to Chelyabinsk two years later. The headquarters of the Samara-Zlatoust Railway was situated in Ufa.

Following the Russian Revolution, a number of railway lines, including those of the Moscow–Kazan Railway and Syzran–Vyazma Railway, were incorporated into the Syzran–Zlatoust Railway. In 1936, the network underwent a renaming to honor Valerian Kuybyshev, along with the city of Samara. In 1989, this railway witnessed the most devastating train accident ever recorded in the Soviet Union, claiming the lives of 575 individuals (see Ufa train disaster).
