= International Exhibition of Science, Art & Industry =

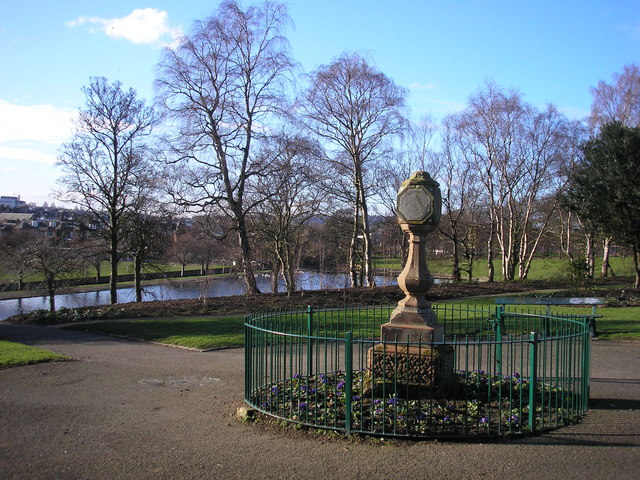
- Sundial in Inverleith Park - exhibit 299D at the exhibition

Overview
- BIE-class: Unrecognized exposition
- Name: International Exhibition of Science, Art & Industry
- Visitors: almost 3 million
- Organized by: William Joseph Kinloch-Anderson (vice chair)

Location
- Country: United Kingdom of Great Britain and Ireland
- City: Edinburgh
- Venue: Meggetland

Timeline
- Opening: 1 May 1890
- Closure: 1 November 1890

The International Exhibition of Science, Art & Industry or Edinburgh International Exhibition was held in 1890 between 1 May and 1 November 1890 in Edinburgh to mark the opening of the Forth Bridge one year earlier.

== Location ==
A horse tram route existed that could transport people from the city centre to Meggetland, to the west Edinburgh, almost 3 million people attended but the exhibition lost money.

== Legacy ==
The vice chair was Councillor William Joseph Kinloch-Anderson who bought exhibit 299D, a sundial designed by Robert Thomson & Sons masons, and later donated it to the City of Edinburgh when Inverleith Park was opened in 1891.

== Souvenirs ==
Souvenirs included glass tumblers and jugs engraved for the purchaser.

== See also ==
- International Exhibition of Industry, Science and Art, similar event in 1886
- Edinburgh Exhibition Cup#1890, football matches played during the exhibition
