= Konstantin Mikhaylovsky =

Russian engineer (1834–1909)

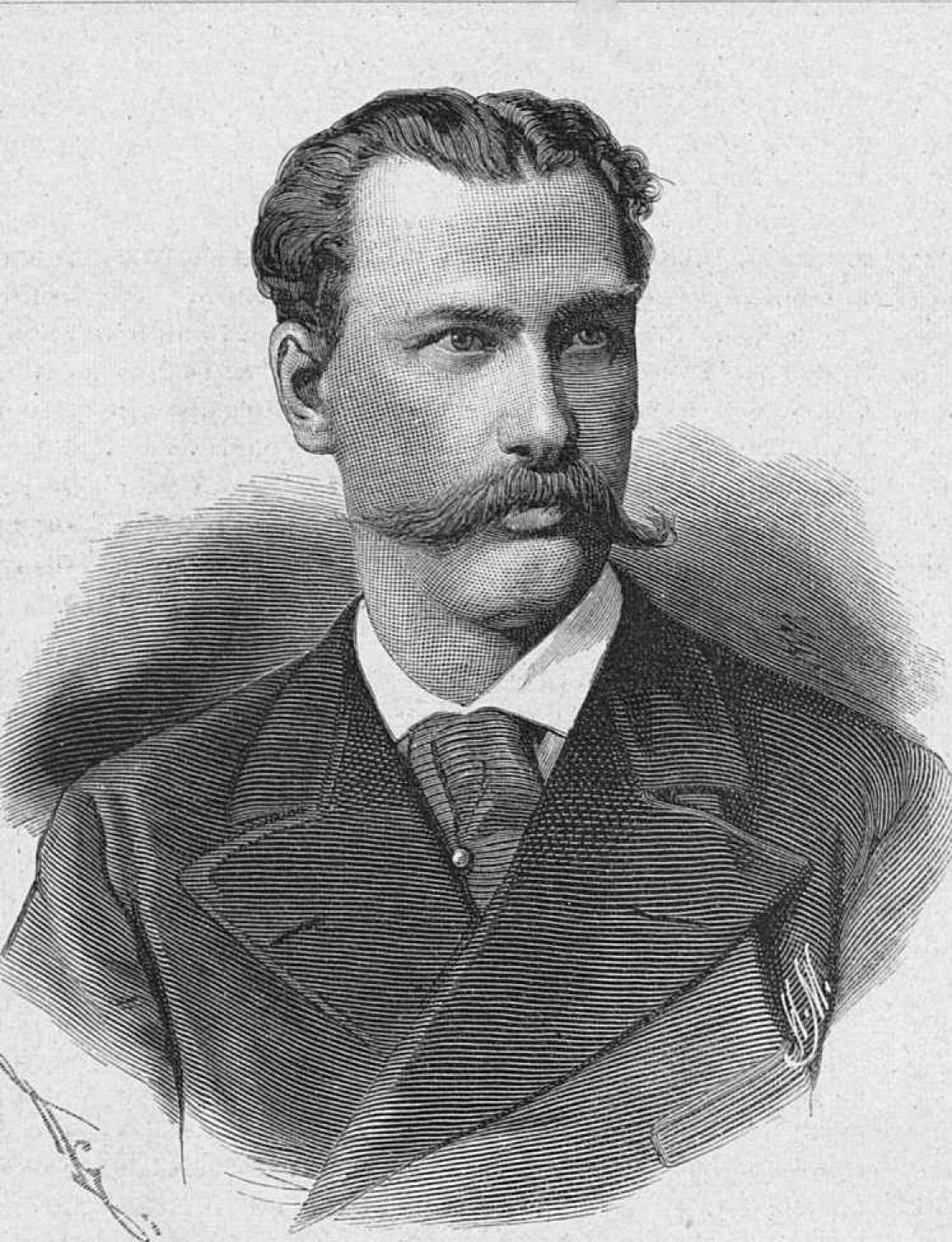
Engineer Mikhailovsky Konstantin Yakovlevich

Konstantin Yakovlevich Mikhaylovsky (Russian: Константин Яковлевич Михайловский; 1834–1909) was a Russian engineer of Polish origin.

== Works ==
Mikhaylovsky designed (with Nikolai Belelubsky and Vladimir Berezin) the Alexander Railway Bridge across the Volga River near Syzran, the first bridge across the lower Volga and at the time of construction (1876–80) the longest bridge in Europe.

Mikhaylovsky also designed the Novomariinsky Canal and other canals of the Mariinsky Water System connecting the Volga with the Baltic Sea (1882–86). He was chief of construction for the Samara–Ufa Railway (1885–88), which was opened to Ufa on 20 September (2 October New Style) 1888. He then served as chief of construction of the Ufa–Zlatoust Railway (1888–90), which was opened to Zlatoust on 20 September (2October) 1890. During this period Mikhaylovsky established workshops at Chelyabinsk to supply iron parts for the construction of iron truss bridges by Belelubsky on the Sim and Yuryuzan rivers. The two lines became the Samara-Zlatoust Railway upon absorbing the Orenburg-Samara Railway on 1 (13) January 1893; in 1934 the system became part of South Ural Railways.

The next project for Mikhaylovsky was service as chief of construction of the Zlatoust–Chelyabinsk Railway (1891–92), which was opened on 22 October (3 November) 1892. He went on to serve as chief of construction of both the Yekaterinburg–Chelyabinsk Railway (1894–96) and the West Siberian Railway (Chelyabinsk-Novonikolayevsk, 1892–96). The West Siberian line was opened on 1 (13) October 1896 and the Yekaterinburg-Chelyabinsk line on 10 (22) November 1896.

In 1898 Mikhaylovsky was named chairman of the committee formed to plan improvements to the Middle Siberian Railway. The work, which was carried out starting in 1904, included adding a second set of tracks, replacement of 18-pound rail with 20-pound rail, and replacement of wooden bridges with stone construction.

== Life ==
Mikhaylovsky was born into a noble family in Chernigov Governorate in 1834. His father was the Chernihiv nobleman Yakov Mikhaylovsky. He graduated from the First Cadet Corps, participated in the Crimean War, and was promoted Podporuchik (second lieutenant) in 1858. He was educated as an engineer at the Institute of Transport (today the St. Petersburg State Transport University), graduating in 1861.

For many years, Mikhaylovsky worked on creating the modern infrastructure of Russian Empire needed for commerce such as the export of wheat to Europe (as in the case of the Mariinsky Water System) or the transportation of cargo and passengers to and from the western regions of Russia across Siberia to the Far East (as in the case of the Trans-Siberian Railway).

Mikhaylovsky was made a Privy Councillor (equivalent to German Geheimrat) in 1899 and an Active Privy Councillor, a high civilian rank equivalent to full general or admiral, in 1907.

Mikhaylovsky died in St. Petersburg on 9 (22) September 1909 and was buried in the Nikolskoe Cemetery in the Alexander Nevsky Monastery in St. Petersburg. The exact location of his grave has been lost.

== Honors ==
During his long service Mikhaylovsky was awarded the following honors:

- Order of St. Stanislaus, third class, also second class (for the construction of canals in the Mariinsky Water System), and first class
- Order of Saint Anne, third class, second class, and first class
- Order of Saint Vladimir fourth class (awarded for the construction of the Alexander Railway Bridge) and second class
- Order of the White Eagle
- Bukhara Emirate's Bukhara Gold Star with diamonds
- Japanese Empire's Order of the Rising Sun, third class

Mikhaylovsky was looked on with the highest Imperial benevolence for the construction of the Imperial road from St. Petersburg to Tsarskoe Selo. For his contributions to railway development, Mikhaylovsky was made an honorary citizen of Chelyabinsk and of Halych. In 1905 Mikhaylovsky was appointed a member of the Council of Ministers of Transport and Communications. On February 24, 1907, his admirer the Emperor Nicholas II awarded him the rank of Actual Privy Councillor.
