= Lysaya Mountain (Zhiguli) =

Mountain in Russia

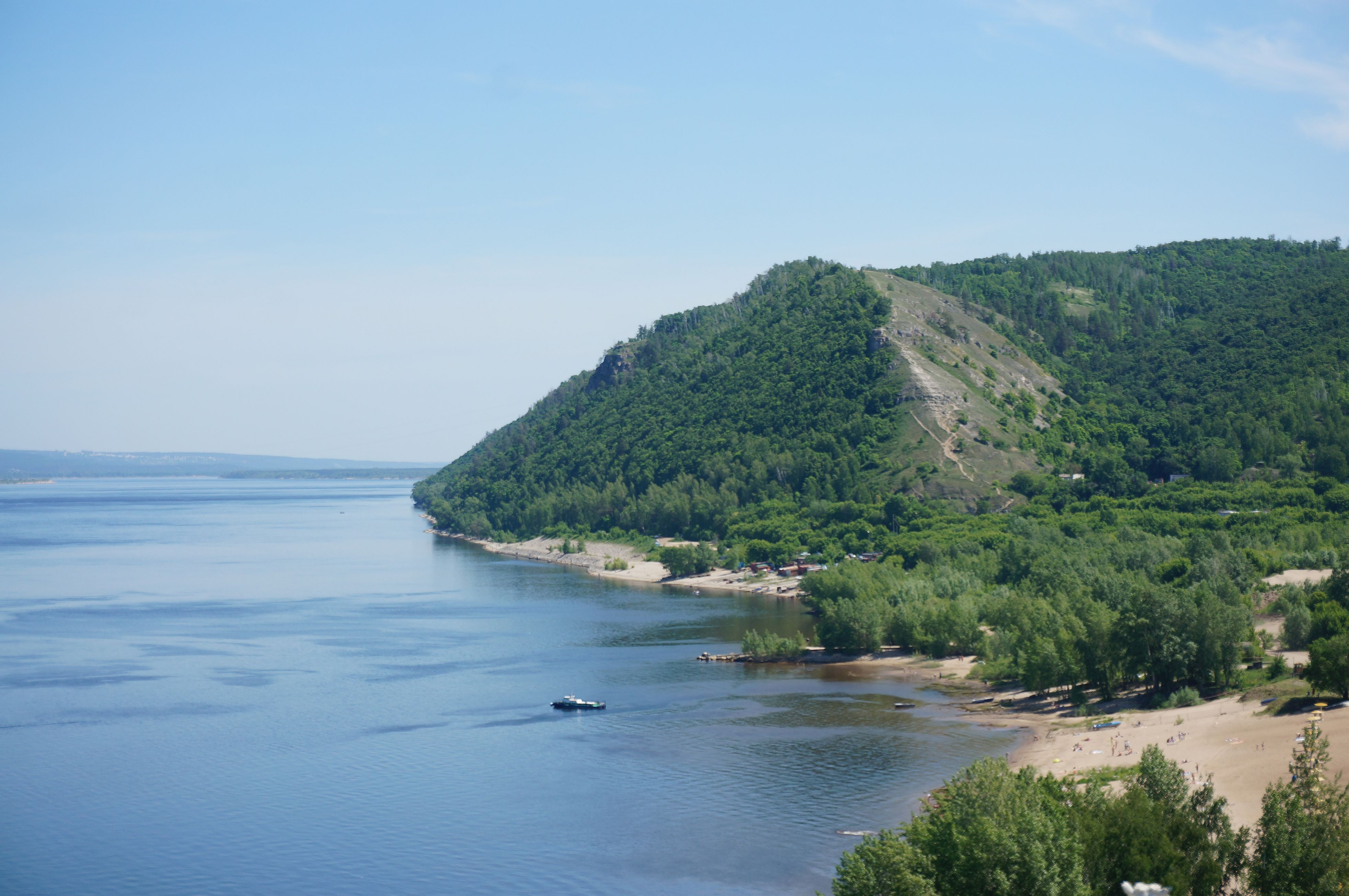
- View of Lysaya Mountain from Mogutova Mountain

Highest point
- Elevation: 275 m (902 ft)
- Coordinates: 53°25′57″N 49°32′52″E

Geography
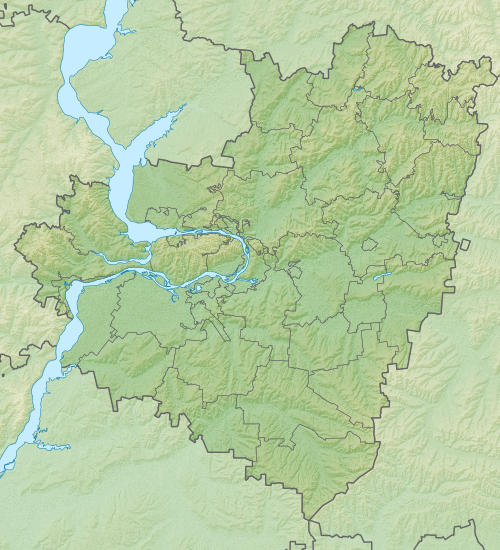
- Location within Samara Oblast Location within European Russia
- Country: Russia
- Region: Samara Oblast
- Parent range: Zhiguli Mountains

Lysaya Mountain (Russian: Лысая гора, IPA: [ˈlɨsəjə ɡɐˈra]), is a peak of the Zhiguli Mountains, located on the border of the city of Zhigulevsk, between the city and the Zhiguli Nature Reserve. It is a unique natural complex combining rich and diverse flora, as well as being a geological, geomorphological monument and a landmark associated with various historical events.

== Description ==
Lysaya Mountain is a peak in the northern, highest part of the Samara Bend — Zhiguli Mountains. It is located to the right of the mouth of the Morkvashinskaya valley, being its strongly eroded slope. The mountain is a narrow range, isolated by the Volga river in the north and a mountain gorge in the south, part of the erosional plateau. It is located on the territory of the Zhiguli forestry, Samarskaya Luka National Park in quarters No. 72 and 73. Opposite, to the left of the mouth of the valley, is Mogutova Mountain, one of the peaks of the Zhiguli Mountains.

The northern slope of the mountain is covered with mixed forests, and the southern slope is steppe, standing out against the background of the right forested slope of the Morkvashinskaya valley with a white treeless ridge, that the mountain was named after. There are significant outcrops of Permian and Carboniferous limestone.

Lysaya Mountain as part of the Zhiguli Mountains belongs to the most important regional structure — Zhigulyovsko-Pugachevsky vault.

== The Sokol Cliff ==
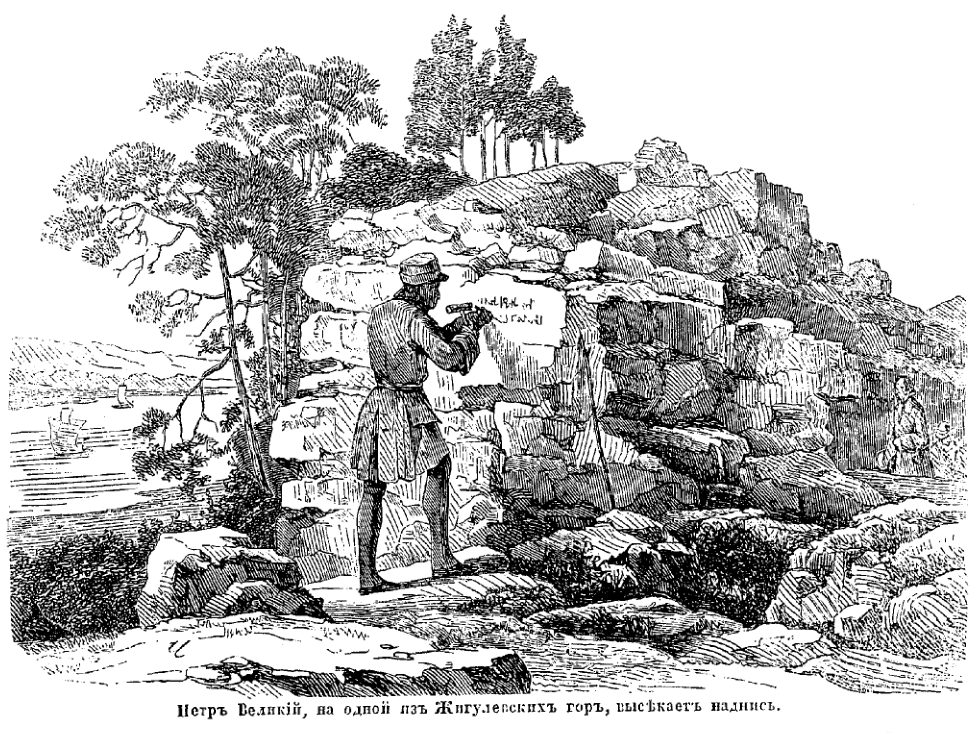
Peter I carves an inscription into a rock. Engraving from 1845

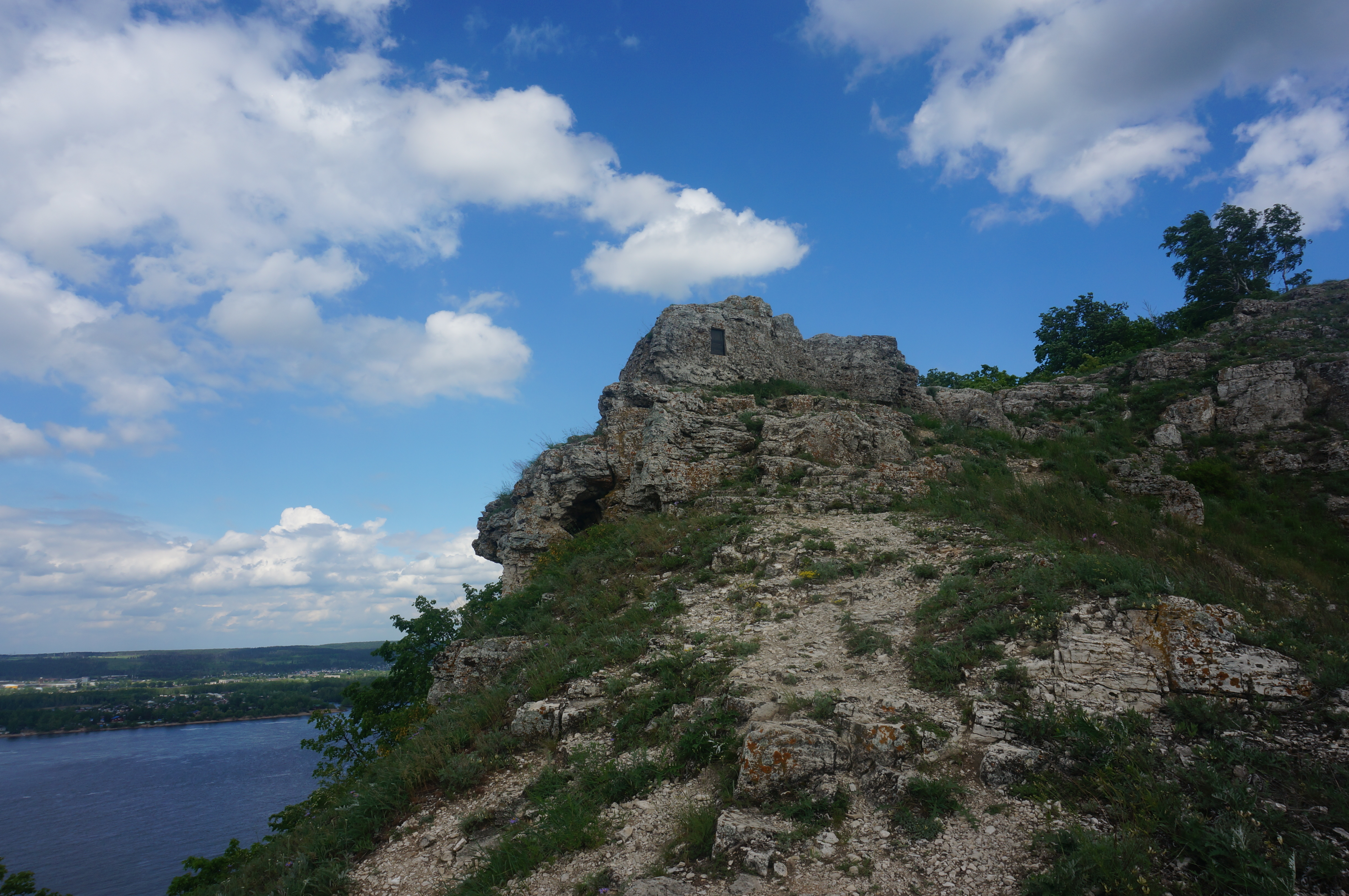
The Sokol Cliff, view from the side of the ascent of the mountain

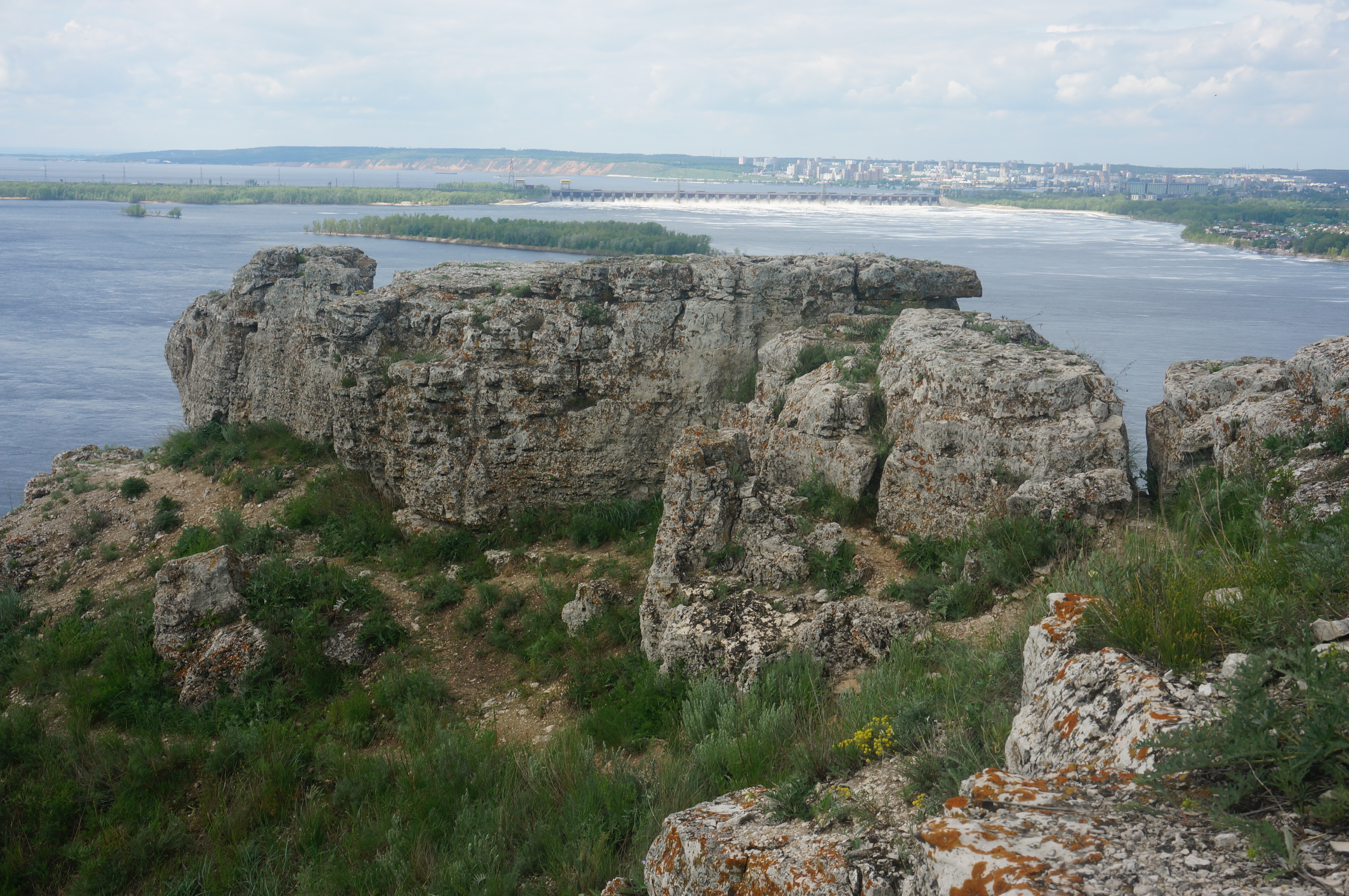
The Sokol Cliff. In the background: Tyelyachiy island, the Zhigulevskaya hydroelectric power plant spillway, Komsomolsky district of Togliatti

The Sokol Cliff (Petrov Stone) is located approximately in the middle of the western slope of the mountain. It is a limestone rock with a flat top, steeply sloping to the north, and having a convenient approach to the top from the west. It is a good viewpoint of the Volga, Zhiguli Hydroelectric Station, Komsomolsky City District.

According to an old legend in 1722 (according to another version, 28 May 1695) Peter the Great climbed Lysaya Mountain and carved his name on the rock, hence the second name of the cliff.

Literary evidence of the existence of an inscription in the XIX century has been preserved. The first mention of it can be found in the diaries of the artists Chernetsov brothers for 1838:

“Not without difficulty we reached the top of Lysaya Mountain; here the guide pointed out to us on a small stone rock carved words, which time has already smoothed out; no matter how hard we tried to find out the content of the inscription, but could not make out anything: many letters had been eradicated, and those that had stayed, those no longer had their present form.“ — Чернецовы Г. Г. и Н. Г. Путешествие по Волге. — Moscow: Мысль, 1970. — p. 108. — 192 p. — 21,000 copies.

A certain inscription on a stone of Lysaya Mountain, seen by him in 1870, was described by Ilya Repin, without, however, giving its contents:

“...we learned that on the nearest rock above the Volga Peter the Great carved his name on a stone by his hand. We went there right away. We were sweating profusely as we climbed up; our collars were soaked, our boots were scuffed. Indeed, there was an inscription, although in some places the sandstone had been greatly weathered by time and bad weather, so it was not easy to make out the inscription“

— Ilya Repin. Далёкое близкое

In the essay "Жегули и Усолье на Волге" published by Sadovnikov Dmitry Nikolayevich in 1872, a more detailed description of the inscription is given:

“ — This very Petrov stone is it," replied the guide. — But I can't find a real inscription, and it was not long ago... A lot of such things were written, but it seems that our men beat off on lime... On the big grey stone, nothing was visible. Finally, we found one small tablet, as my companion called it. In rather large Latin letters there was a mysterious row: A.-N.-T.-O.-A.-N.-i; the year 1720 was marked, and that’s it. It was impossible to distinguish anything else. The letters were covered with mold, and the stone itself was very weathered. The inscription of Tsar Peter disappeared...“ — Sadovnikov Dmitry. Жегули и Усолье на Волге // Беседа: journal. — Moscow, Saint-Petersburg, 1872. — № 12.

Samara local historian Petr Alabin, however, believed the author of the inscription was not Peter I, who was attributed a similar act on the left bank of the Volga, on the Tsar's barrow, but Prince Dimitrie Cantemir, who left an inscription on 11 June 1722 while accompanying the tsar on the Persian campaign of Peter the Great. He left an entry about it in his journal:

“Prince Dmitry... on the 11th of June came near the village (on the Volga river) of Morkvashi, not reaching 40 versts to Samara, saw a large mountain called Lysaya, climbed it, carved his name and the year on a stone“. — Theophilus Siegfried Bayer. История о жизни и делах молдавского господаря князя Константина Кантемира. — Мoscow, 1783. — p. 300. — 408 p.

By the early 20th century, no trace of the inscription remained.

Oleg Rakshin, a modern Samara local historian, believes that the letters of the inscription A.-N.-T.-O.-A.-N.-i seen by D. N. Sadovnikov can be deciphered as: ANTIOHCANTEMiR ANNO 1722 — Antiochus Kantemir — Prince Dmitry's son, who accompanied his father on this trip, and may have accompanied him on the ascent of the mountain as well.

== Gorodishche ==
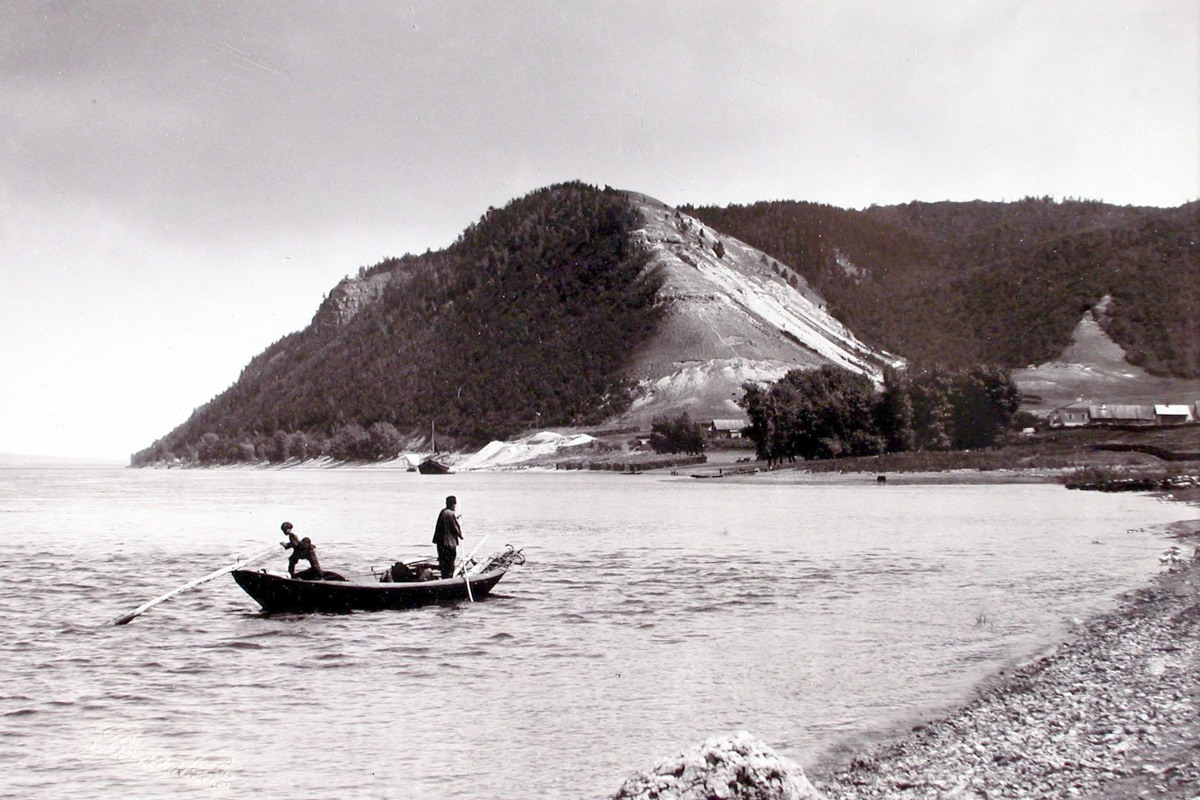
A view of Lysaya Mountain. Historic photo

At the top of the mountain, the ridge forms a flat area. There is a hillfort (Russian: городище, Gorodishche) with traces of ancient settlements — a monument of scientific and historical importance.

In 1923, the territory of the ancient settlement was examined by the expedition of the Society of Archaeology, History, Ethnography and Natural History, established at Samara University. In 1936 the ancient settlement was inspected by archaeologist Grozdilov, G. P. However, full-fledged excavations were not carried out until 1970, when an archaeological expedition of Samara University led by Matveeva, Galina Ivanovna worked on the mountain.

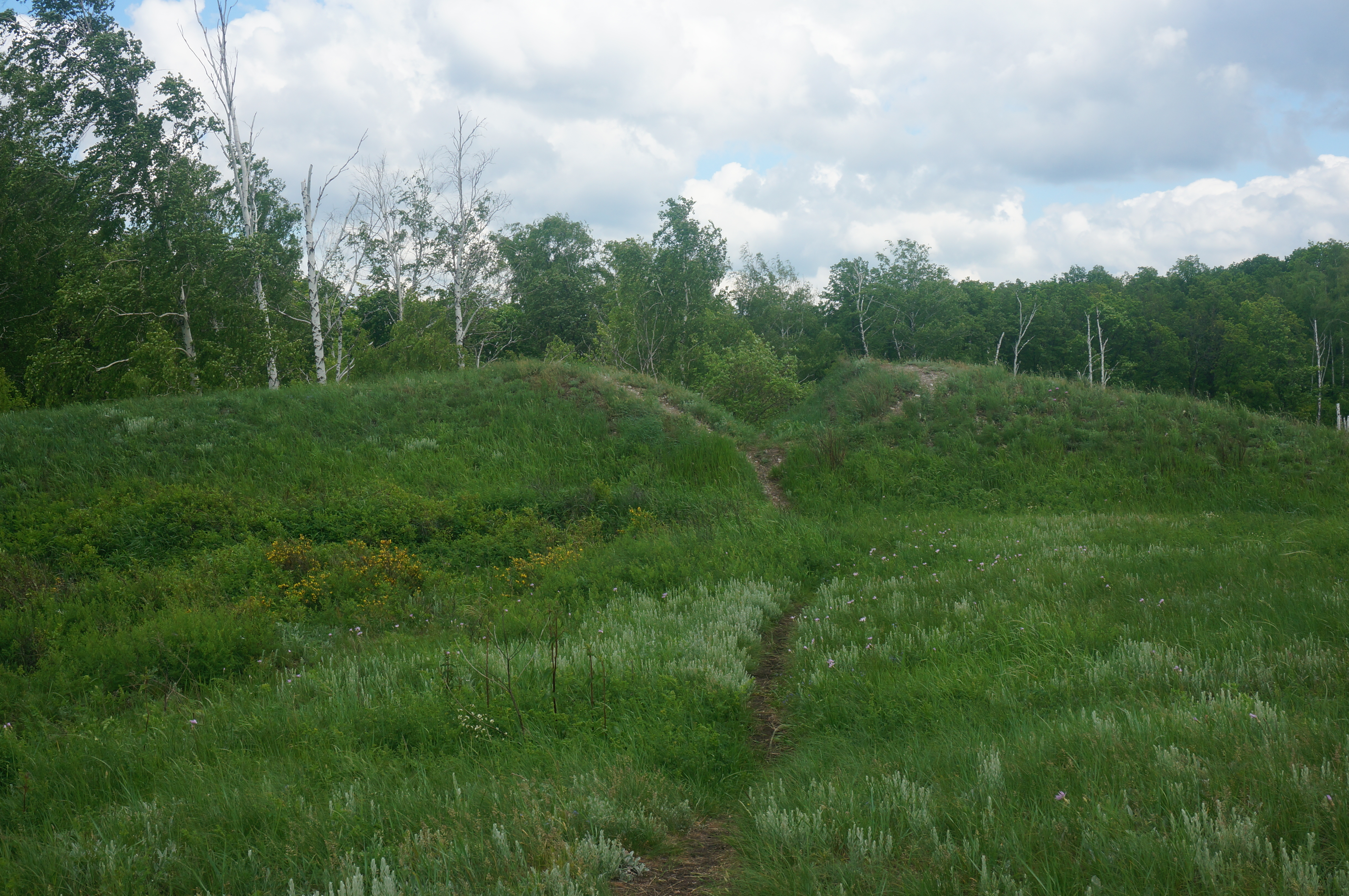
The remains of the rampart near the top

The total area of the settlement was about 2000 m^{2}. The fortifications consisted of three ramparts and moats. The twin ramparts and moats divided the settlement area into two sites. On the floor side, there was another line of ramparts and moats. On the slope of the mountain there are remains of a rampart, which presumably served as a defence of the middle part of the hillfort, enclosed between the two fortification systems. Presumably there was a palisade, which turned the settlement, located on the top of a mountain with steep slopes, into an almost impregnable fortress. However, it was inconvenient to live permanently in such a high and narrow place, so it is believed that people mostly lived in some other village or settlement (Russian: селище, selishche) located nearby, and hid in the settlement on the mountain at the moments of danger.

A total of 244 m^{2} of the site was researched, where the utility pits were investigated. No traces of dwellings remained, so it was concluded that they were wooden and located about the ground. The occupation debris of the settlement is thin and extremely poor, consisting of dusty forest loams, saturated with angular rocks and stones. The biggest category of finds is ceramics. No unbroken samples of ceramics were found. The expedition collected fragments of pottery of two different types.

Some of the pottery samples are made of clay with limestone crumbs, round-bottomed, with a high neck decorated with rectangular impressions. They were characterized by hatched internal and external surfaces. The ornament was applied with the end of a triangular or rounded stick. Such ware of the "Belair type", belonging to Finno-Ugric tribes, was widespread in the region in the VII-IV centuries BC, being named after the settlement of Belaya Gora, located on the Samara Bend near the village of Podgory (Samara region). It is now considered to be a Belogorsk variant of the Ananyino culture. The second type of ware — rough, with knobby surface, with notches decorating the corollas, belongs to the Imenkovskaya culture, widespread in the Middle Volga Region in the V—VII centuries and indicates that the settlement was inhabited repeatedly.

== Research ==
Besides archaeologists, Lysaya Mountain has long been actively studied by scientists of other specialties: the calcareous outcrops of the mountain and its nature have been investigated by geologists Pavlov Alexei Petrovich, Noinsky Mikhail Eduardovich, paleontologist Stukenberg Alexander Antonovich, geomorphologists Barkov Alexander Sergeyevich, Obedientova Glafira Vitalievna.

Much attention was devoted to the mountain by botanists. In the summer 1868, the Kazan Society of Nature Testers sent here Baum, Otton Ottonovich (1842–1892) to collect a herbarium on the mountain. His collections included such species as Hedysarum grandiflorum, Astragalus rupifragus, Scabiosa isetensis, Gypsophila juzepczukii, Veronica incana, Sedum acre.

In 1889, botanist Zhilyakov, Nikolai Pavlovich counted 124 species of plants while compiling a summary of the flora of Lysaya Mountain. In 1926, Sprygin Ivan Ivanovich was exploring the mountain during an expedition to select the site of the Zhiguli Nature Reserve. Apart from them, the flora of Lysaya Mountain was also studied by Sergey Korzhinsky, Abolin Robert Ivanovich, Cherepnin Leonid Mikhailovich, Plaksina Tamara Ivanovna.

== Flora ==
According to the scheme of phytochorion Samara Bend by Professor Saxonov Sergey Vladimirovich, Lysaya Mountain is a part of the Zhiguliovsky floristic area and belongs to the Lysogorsky elementary floristic subarea. The modern flora of Lysaya Mountain has 426 species, accounting for 61.7% of the number of species of the Zhigulyov floristic region.

The sunny slopes: west, south-west and south-south-east are the most floristically interesting. Several variations of unique plant communities can be found here: grey rosette grass, communities of rocky screes, and rocky outcrops. A number of endemic species are represented, including Astragalus helmii, Astragalus zingeri, Cerastium zhiguliense, Euphorbia zhiguliensis, and Gypsophila juzepczukii. Several relict species are also represented here: Aster alpinus, Clausia aprica, Ephedra distachya, Helianthemum nummularium, Helictotrichon desertorum, Krascheninnikovia ceratoides, and others.

Meadow steppe communities occur on the plateau-like summit of the mountain, where plants of steppe shrub communities, permissive forests, and rocky steppe communities occur simultaneously: Dianthus campestris, Fritillaria ruthenica, Melica transsilvanica, Tulipa biebersteiniana, and others.

The western and north-western foothills of the mountain have been heavily modified. There is a tarmac road, and there are traces of quarry work, which has dug up the bottom of the slope. As a result, the flora here is rich in weedy and trivial species: Elymus repens, Artemisia absinthium, Artemisia sieversiana, Chicory, Echinops sphaerocephalus, Cynoglossum officinale, Echium vulgare, and others.

The northern slope of the mountain, facing the Volga, is covered with forests. These are mainly lime and maple forests, with small aspen and birch forests along the ravines. On the ridges and in the upper part of the mountain there are pine forests, which turn into broad-leaved pine forests. The main species are: the small-leaved lime, the Norway maple, common aspen and the European red pine.

In the undergrowth are common: the common hazel, fly honeysuckle, Euonymus verrucosus, bird cherry, rowan, and guelder-rose. The field layer is composed of non-moral mesophilic species: European wild ginger, hairy sedge, Viola mirabilis, the sweet woodruff, the Solomon's seal, the American milletgrass, the spring pea, Pulmonaria mollis, ground elder, and others.

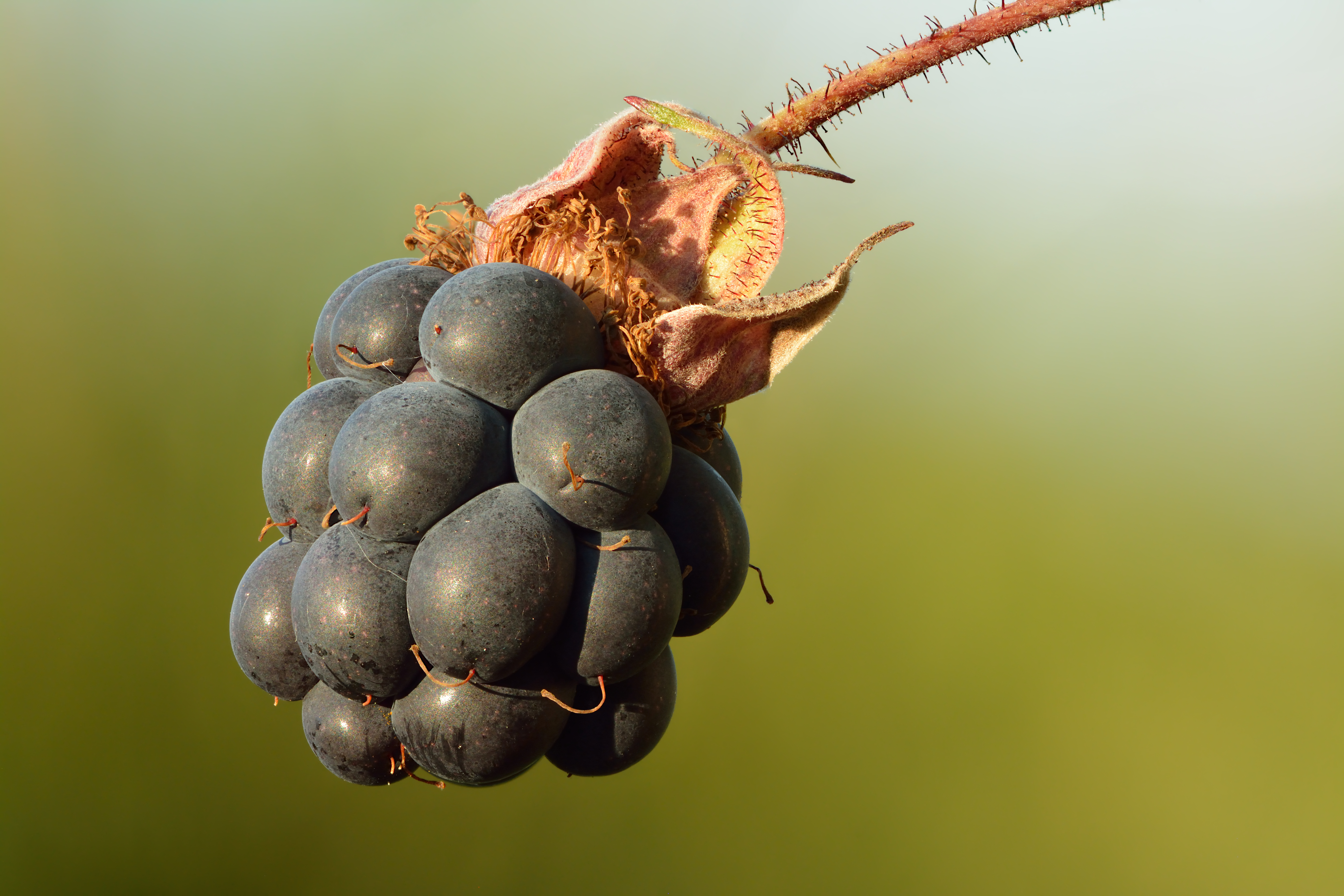
European dewberry

The foot of the northern slope is a narrow (30–50 m) abrasion terrace, a remnant of the Volga floodplain, flooded during the rise of the Saratov Reservoir. On the terrace, upland deciduous forests gradually give way to valley sedge and alder forests. Forests of the black poplar are sparse, light-coloured, with inclusions of silver poplar and white willow in both small groups and solitary specimens.

The shrubby layer is made up of representatives of Dewberry, Dyer's Green, Buckthorn and Cinnamon Rose. The herbs are represented by the great burnet, bent, Tansy, rough horsetail, Bromus inermis, and others.

The transition between the upper part of the abrasion terrace and the driftwood is occupied by the common alder with a similar floristic composition. On the towpath there are plants characteristic of river floodplains: European bedstraw, leafy spurge. In general, it is rather species-rich with a relatively low project herbaceous cover (10-15%).

=== Protected species ===
48 plant species native to Lysaya Mountain are listed in the Red Book of the Samara Region.

- Adonis vernalis
- Alyssum lenense
- Asperula petrea
- Asplenium ruta-muraria
- Aster alpinus
- Astragalus helmii
- Astragalus zingeri
- Bupleurum falcatum
- Campanula wolgensis
- Cerastium zhiguliensis
- Clausia aprica
- Cotoneaster melanocarpus
- Crataegus volgensis
- Ephedra distachya
- Epipactis helleborine
- Euphorbia virgata
- Euphorbia zhiguliensis
- Ferula tatarica
- Festuca wolgensis
- Fritillaria ruthenica
- Gagea bulbifera
- Galatella angustissima
- Gentiana cruciata
- Gypsophila juzepczukii
- Gypsophilla zheguliensis
- Hedysarum grandiflorum
- Helianthemum nummularium
- Helictotrichon schellianum
- Hylotelephium zheguliense
- Hypericum elegans
- Koeleria sclerophylla
- Laser (plant)
- Linum ucranicum
- Lotus zhegulensis
- Neottia nidus-avis
- Pinus sylvestris
- Polygala sibirica
- Populus alba
- Primula macrocalyx
- Pulsatilla patens
- Scabiosa isetensis
- Schivereckia podolica
- Stipa pennata
- Stipa pulcherrima
- Tanacetum sclerophyllum
- Thymus zheguliensis
- Tulipa biebersteiniana
- Valeriana tuberose

== Fauna ==
The fauna of Lysaya Mountains has been researched to a much lesser extent. Three species of amphibians have been described: European green toad, marsh frog and moor frog — make up a third of the total number of amphibian species on the Samara Lane. This is due to the lack of water bodies suitable for breeding and larval development and to the high anthropogenic impact.

== See also ==
- Zhiguli Mountains
- Samara Bend
- Samara Oblast

== Bibliography ==
- Зудина, В. Н. "О состоянии изученности культур оседлого населения раннего железного века в Самарском Поволжье". 40 лет Средневолжской археологической экспедиции: Краеведческие записки (in Russian) (XV). Samara: Офорт: 101–110.
- Конева, Н. В.; Саксонов, С.В.; Сенатор, С. А. (2009). "117 лет изучения флоры Лысой горы на Самарской Луке". Фиторазнообразие Восточной Европы (in Russian) (7). Togliatti: Institute of Ecology of the Volga Basin RAS: 146–170. ISSN 2072-8816.
- Любославова, Л. Н. (2013-06-07). "Петр Первый, солнцепоклонники, ракушки и все, все, все". Волжская коммуна (in Russian). Togliatti.
- Саксонов, С. В.; Сенатор, С. А., eds. (2013). Могутова гора и её окрестности. Подорожник (PDF) (in Russian). Togliatti: Кассандра. p. 6.
- Ульянов, В.; Плаксина, Т. (1995). "Лысая гора Жигулей". In Захаров, А. С. (ed.). «Зелёная книга» Поволжья: Охраняемые природные территории Самарской области. Samara: Book Publishing House. pp. 245–246. ISBN 5-7575-0465-X.
