= Middle Volga Integrated Biosphere Reserve =

Specially protected natural area in Samara Oblast, Russia

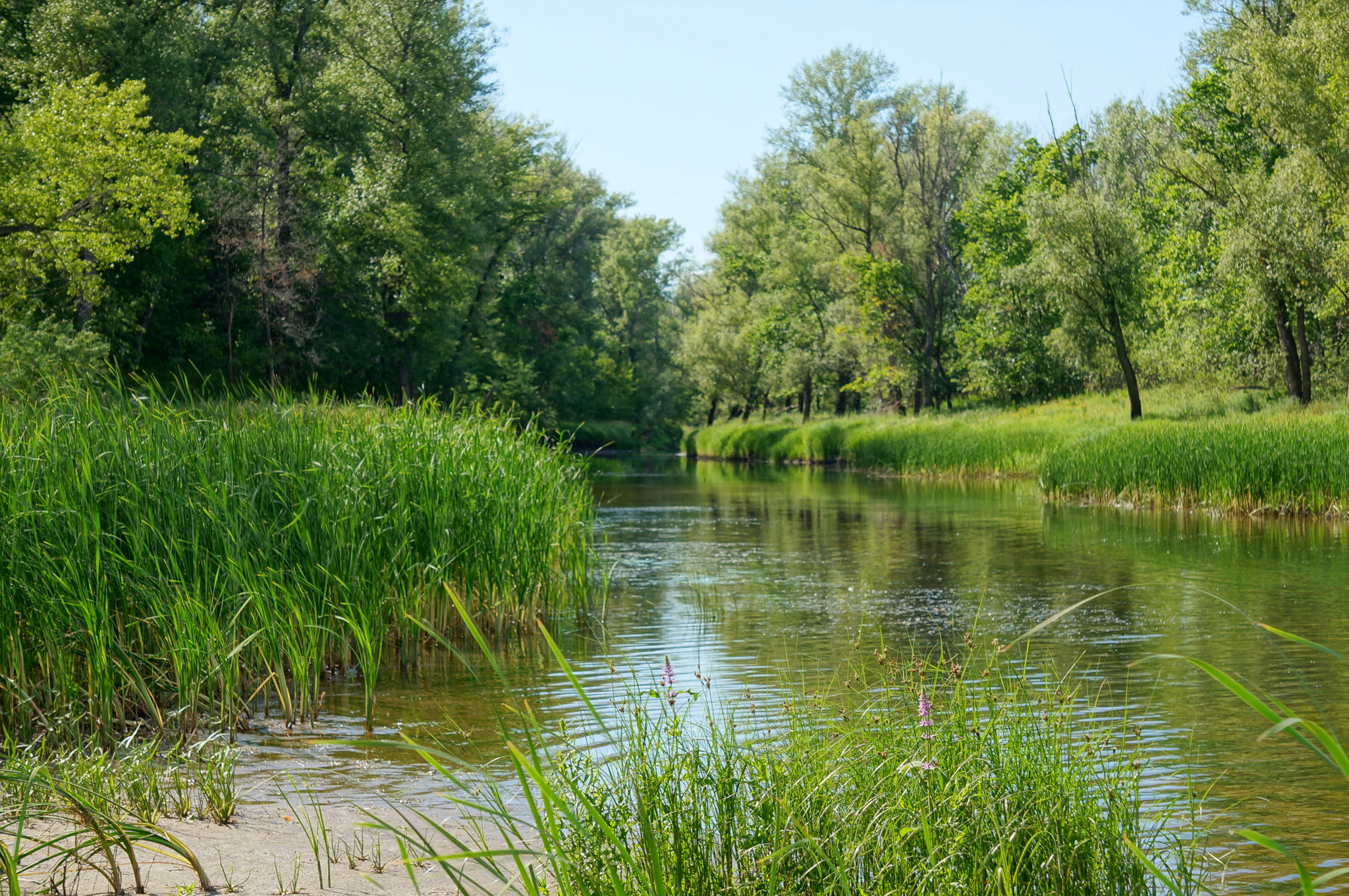
- Protected Volga island Seryodysh

- Location within Russia
- Nearest city: Zhigulevsk
- Coordinates: 53°17′47″N 49°29′16″E
- Area: 400,000 ha (1,500 sq mi)
- Established: 27.10.2006
- Visitors: 1.5 million people per year (in 2011)
- Governing body: Zhiguli Nature Reserve; Samarskaya Luka National Park

The Middle Volga Integrated Biosphere Reserve is a specially protected natural area located in the Samara Oblast in Russia. Established in 2006, it is a combination of the Zhiguli Nature Reserve and the Samarskaya Luka National Park, making it the first integrated biosphere reserve in Russia.

== Description ==
The World Network of Biosphere Reserves included the reserve on 27 October 2006. It was created by merging the adjacent Zhiguli Nature Reserve and the Samarskaya Luka National Park, making it the first integrated biosphere reserve in Russia.

The reserve aims to protect the landscapes of the Zhiguli mountains and the forest-steppe of the Middle Volga region, organize environmental monitoring, develop a system of careful nature management, and create a model territory for sustainable development. The reserve covers a total area of approximately 400,000 hectares, with the core area accounting for about 30.1 thousand hectares (7.5% of the total area), the protection (buffer) zone covering 97.1 thousand hectares (24.3%), and the transition (cooperation zone) covering 272.8 thousand hectares (68.2%). Sources often refer to much smaller, incorrect figures (Core - 30 thousand ha, buffer zone - 50 thousand ha, transitional - 70 thousand ha). The reserve's altitude ranges from 30 to 382 meters above sea level.

The reserve is primarily situated within the Samarskaya Luka, at the centre of the Samara-Togliatti agglomeration. The majority of the Luka area remains largely unaffected by human activity. In 1927, the first protection measures were implemented for a portion of the territory. The reserve also covers parts of the territories of the left bank of the Usa River and the left bank of the Volga River, specifically in the urban forests of Togliatti. This includes areas within four municipal districts (Volzhsky, Stavropolsky, Syzransky, Shigonsky) and two urban districts (Zhigulevsk and Togliatti). Population estimates within the reserve are only approximate. They state that the core zone has no permanent population, while the buffer zone has around 20,000 people and the transition zone has between 40,000 and 80,000 people depending on the season.

The reserve's landscapes and ecosystems are subject to varying degrees of exploitation, ranging from protected areas to agricultural, industrial, and urban development.

== Protected sites ==
The Middle Volga Integrated Biosphere Reserve is characterised by great biological diversity, with unique limestone mountain communities, typical forest-steppe ecosystems of the Samarskaya Luka plateau and the valleys of the Volga and Usa rivers. The limestone mountains are home to stony steppes, pristine steppe pine barrens and mixed coniferous forests on the rendzina and brown earth soils. Furthermore, the plateau of Samarskaya Luka boasts preserved areas of meadow and true steppes, as well as indigenous forests such as linden, oak, and birch forests, and derived communities including aspen, maple, birch, and elm forests.

The ecosystems of the Volga floodplain are represented by floodplain oak forests, forests dominated by black poplar, white willow, silver poplar and black alder, talnik thickets and flood meadows. In limestone mining areas, special natural communities have formed, including adits that have become Eastern Europe's largest hibernation sites for bats.

A large portion of the land is covered by deteriorated steppe and meadow ecosystems, as well as cultivation on chernozem and gray forest soils.

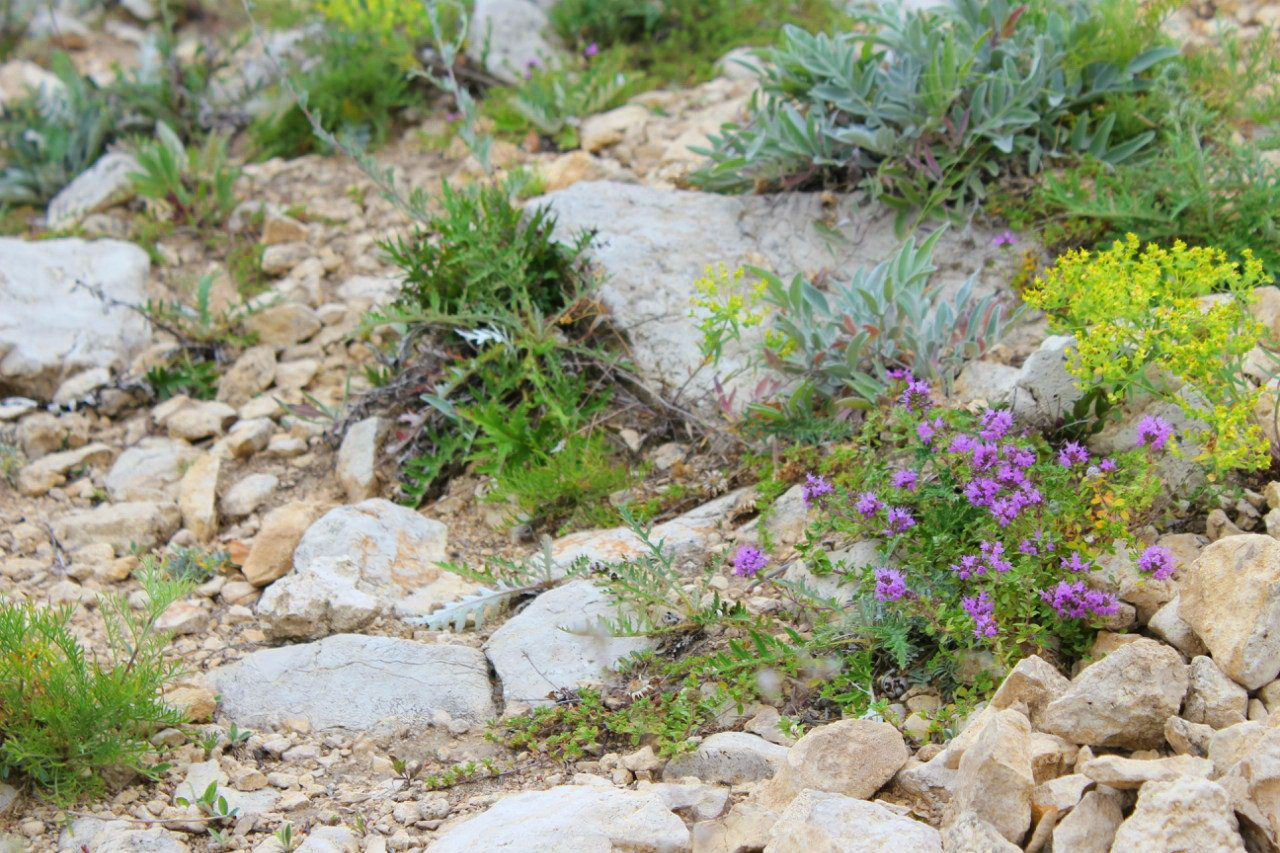
Stony steppe

The Zhiguli Mountains are especially valuable. They are a tectonic upland located along a deep fault line that stretches latitudinally. This area is the highest part of the Russian Plain. Since the Pliocene epoch, the Zhiguli Mountains have remained free from glacial coverage and have not been flooded during transgressions of the Caspian Sea that reached their foothills, which has resulted in Zhiguli becoming a refugium that still preserves representatives of flora and fauna characteristic of long-gone climatic epochs. The reserve contains a significant number of endemic and relict fauna species, some of which are associated with specific insect species. Relict communities, including mountain forests, oak forests, and mixed coniferous forests with a combination of steppe and taiga flora, rocky vegetation, and stony steppes, have been preserved within the reserve.

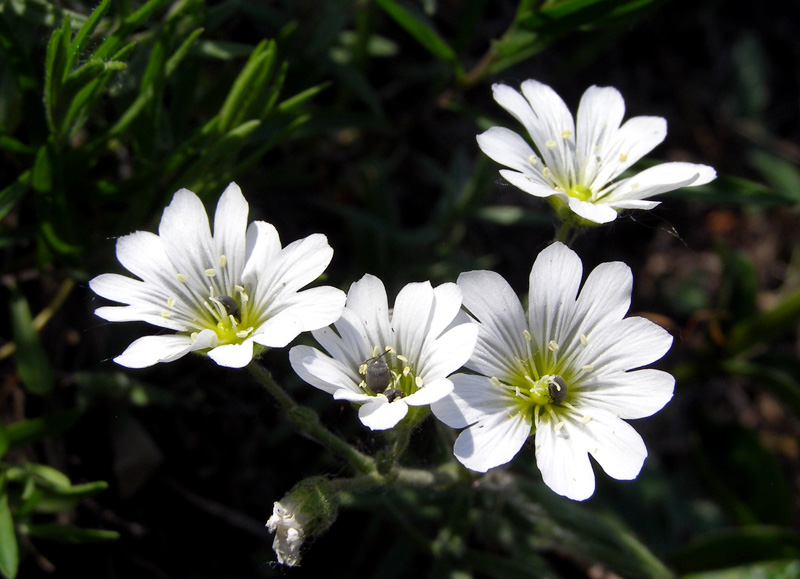
Endemic - Cerastium Zhiguliense

The fragmentarily preserved steppe areas of the reserve are of great value. They are found only on small unploughed remnant areas on the Volga coastal slopes, in the Zhiguli Mountains and Sengiley Hills. These are remnants of steppe vegetation that once covered most of the plateau of Samarskaya Luka. Although small in size, these areas of steppes cover all steppe types found in Samara Oblast: meadow (northern) steppes, true (southern) steppes consisting of Volga fescue and Stipa, as well as special variants of steppes such as shrub steppes, stony and sandy steppes. Stony steppes are present on the open southern and south-western slopes of the Zhiguli Mountains. These areas range from a few tens of square metres to several hectares, with the largest being located on Strelnaya Gora and Molodetsky Kurgan (up to 13 hectares), as well as in the southern part of the Sengileevskaya Upland - on the chalk hills stretching along the bank of the Volga River from Podvalye to Klimovka. Shrub steppes are present in Zhiguli, as well as in the central, southern, and south-western parts of Samarskaya Luka, and in Shiryaevskaya, Askulskaya, and Brusyanskaya valleys. There are fragments of true steppes in areas that are not suitable for ploughing in the central and south-western parts of Samarskaya Luka. Meadow steppes are preserved in the south-east of Samarskaya Luka, with a few dozen hectares remaining in the Levashov forest steppe, a smaller area near the village of Podgory, and even smaller areas in the Shiryaevskaya, Kochkarskaya and Morkvashinskaya valleys. Sandy steppes can be found on the Usinsk coast, in the vicinity of Novinki village, in the Racheyskiy Bor, and on the islands.

The high diversity of natural communities has resulted in a significant number of plant and animal species. Thus, over 1500 species of flowering plants, 4 species of gymnosperm, 21 species of ferns, 9 species of horsetails, approximately 170 species of mosses, around 200 species of lichens, and roughly 800 species of macromycete fungi have been studied within the reserve. There are over 300 species of vertebrates, including 62 mammals, more than 200 bird species, 8 amphibian species, 9 reptile species, and 68 fish species. The invertebrate fauna under study comprises approximately 7,000 species, of which around 5,000 are insects. Of particular interest are the endemics, consisting of 5 plant species and 11 invertebrate species, and relicts, comprising over 60 plant species and more than 80 invertebrate species, as well as 21 plant species, 2 mammal species, 19 bird species, and 37 invertebrate species that require special protection and are listed in the Red Book of Russia. The Zhiguli Mountains are a classic habitat for 12 species of plants and it was here that the first systematic descriptions of these species were made.

There are 22 natural monuments of Samara Oblast on the territory of the reserve. The reserve also serves to preserve valuable evidence of disappeared cultures, including the Savromatian (6th - 4th centuries BC), Sarmatian (4th - 2nd centuries BC), Srubnaya (6th - 3rd centuries BC), Imenkovskaya (5th century), Novinkovskaya (7th - 8th centuries), and Volga Bulgaria (8th - 9th centuries). There are approximately 200 archaeological monuments located on the territory in total. Additionally, the reserve contains preserved noble estates from the mid-19th century.

== Problems ==
A serious threat to the reserve remains from some industrial operations, particularly oil fields and limestone quarries.

In 2010, the reserve was significantly impacted by fires. Over 1,000 hectares of unique and typical plant communities were affected within the reserve, while in the urban forest of Togliatti, located in the transition zone of the reserve, 1057 hectares of forest were completely destroyed and another 792 hectares were partially damaged.

== Reserve management ==
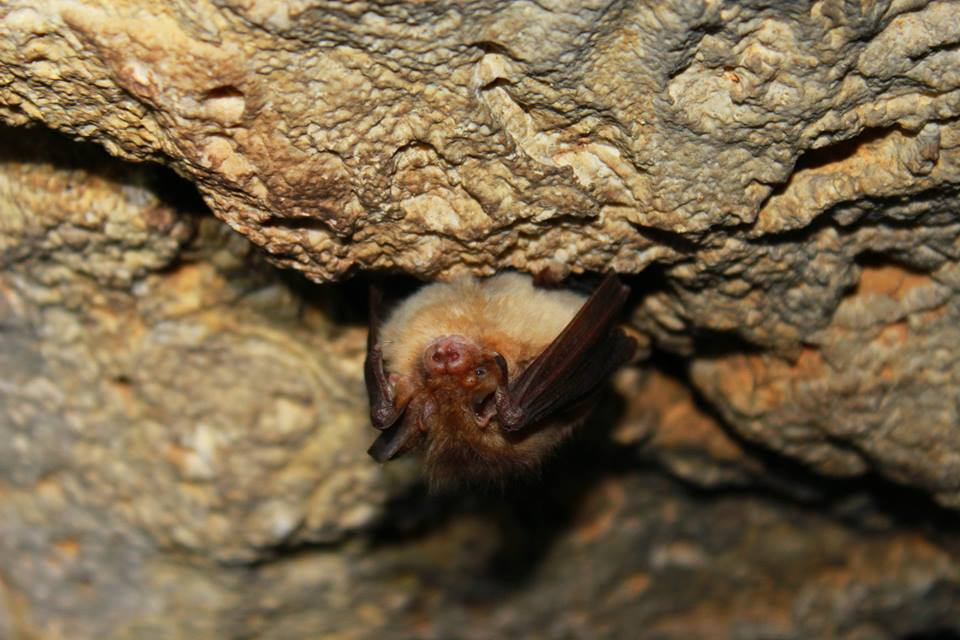
Bat

No special management structure has been established for the reserve yet. The functions of the reserve are carried out by the Zhiguli Nature Reserve, the Samarskaya Luka National Park, research institutes and executive authorities.

In 2010, bars were installed at the entrances to the Popova Gora adits near Shiryaevo village. This is the most effective measure to preserve the hibernation site of bats.

== Tourism ==
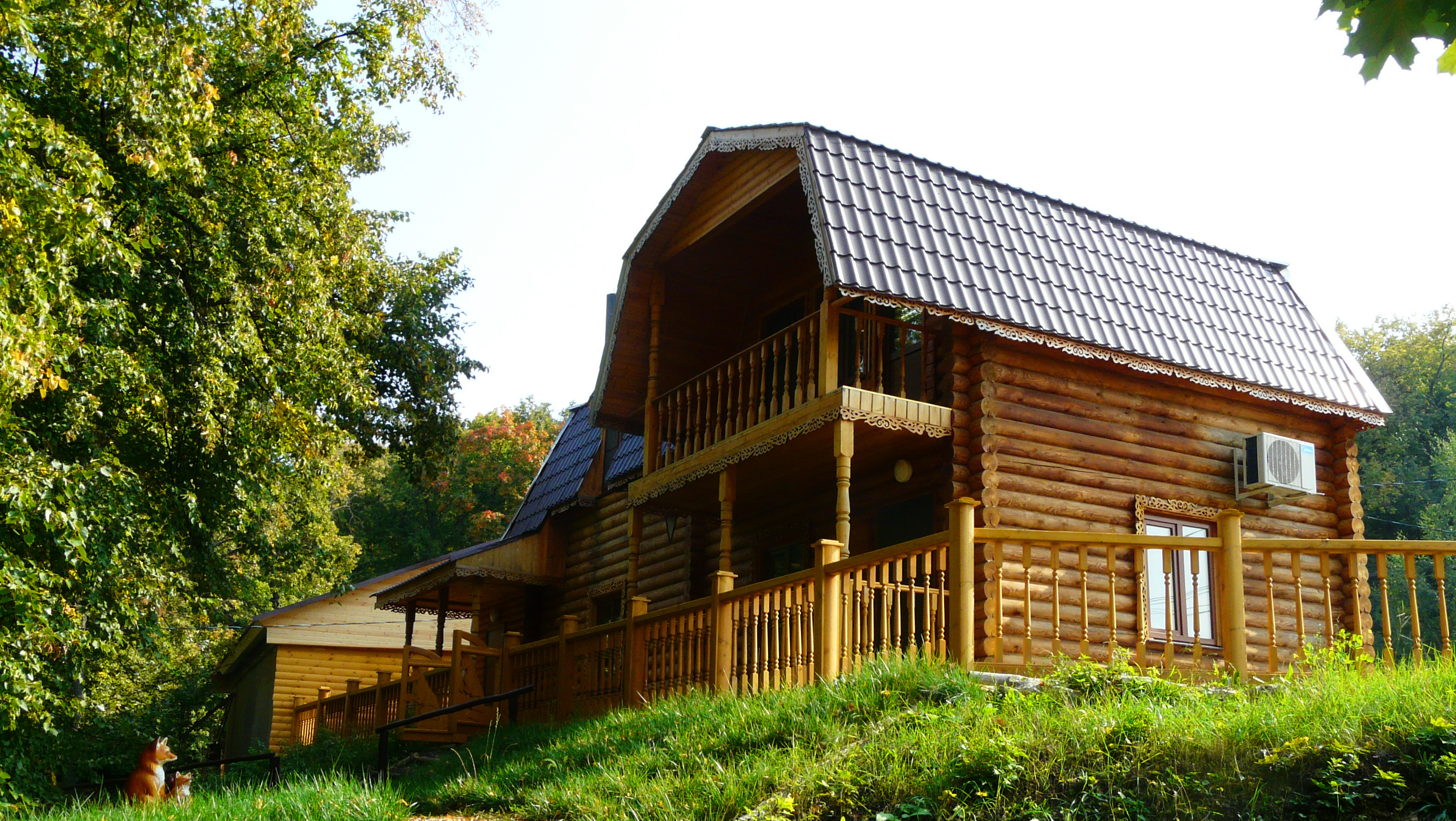
Fox House Museum in the National Park

As part of the regional tourism development programme in the Samara Oblast, one of the priority areas is tourism in the Middle Volga Reserve, particularly in the Samarskaya Luka area. Samarskaya Luka is the primary destination for ecological tourism in the region. Currently, the reserve receives an estimated 1 million unorganized visitors per year, with an additional 500,000 people covered by guided tours and ecological trails.

However, both the protected area staff and natural resources often struggle to cope with the influx of tourists. Preserved species of steppes are particularly vulnerable to recreational impact. In 2008, the administration of Samarskaya Luka National Park was forced to close Molodetsky Mound, a popular recreation site, for over a year due to critical conservation concerns. The slopes needed restoration, territories required cleaning, and eco-trails had to be equipped.

Currently, the reserve offers several organized tourist routes, such as 'Molodetsky Kurgan and Mount Devya', 'Shiryaevo Village and Mount Camel', 'Kamennaya Chasha tract', 'Witch Lake', 'Stepan Razin's Cave', and 'Mordovinskaya Floodplain' in the Samarskaya Luka National Park. Additionally, there is a car route called 'Strelnaya Mountain' and a pedestrian route named 'Kamennaya Chasha' in the Zhigulevsky Natural Reserve.

The reserve hosts the LukAmorye eco-cultural festival and several tourist centres, including the Samarskaya Luka history and local history museum, the history museum in Usolye, the historical museum complex in the Shiryaevo village, and the Lukomorye educational complex.

=== Tourism facilitation ===
The Ministry of Construction of the Samara Oblast has developed a project to create a tourist and recreational complex named 'Zhigulevskaya Pearl'. The project entails the establishment of three all-season resorts in Shiryaevo, Podgory, and Rozhdestveno. The plan includes the construction of hotel and recreational complexes, two skiing complexes with toboggan runs as well as a snowboard park, golf courses and sports complexes, the improvement of the beach area, the reconstruction of existing berths and the construction of new berths for yachts and private vessels. The project also includes the construction of a cable car across the Volga River called 'Samara - Rozhdestveno' with a capacity of 900 people per hour and a 15 km motorway from Podgory to Shiryaevo.

The total area of the tourism and recreation complex will be 701.8 hectares, with a capacity of up to 3,298 people, and 660 employees will be needed to support its operation.

The project has been approved by the Ministry of Natural Resources and Environment of the Russian Federation, and appropriate amendments have been made to the Rozhdestveno Territory Planning Project and the Zhigulevsk General Plan. However, the project has many opponents.

It is noted that the Zhigulevsk Pearl project has not undergone any public environmental impact assessment, it does not take into account any potential effects on protected areas of federal significance, and there is no list of measures to minimise such effects. Even with the existing recreational pressure in the area of the village of Shiryaevo, the reserve and the national park have serious problems with the protection of the territory, and the expected increase in the number of visitors will only intensify them.

The project also calls for the area of the reserve to be reduced by almost 7,000 hectares, in direct contravention of the federal law 'On Specially Protected Natural Areas'. A number of environmental scientists, supported by the Russian branch of Greenpeace, opposed such a change in the reserve's protected areas. A public petition demanding the cancellation of the decision of the Ministry of Natural Resources and Environment of the Russian Federation on the construction of the Zhigulevskaya Pearl tourist and recreational complex has gathered more than 25,000 signatures.

There are also alternative projects for the development of tourism in the reserve. It is a project to create a tourist village "Novaya Ryazan" on the territory of the Samarskaya Luka National Park, where on the area of 150 hectares it is planned to build a hotel complex, farms, greenhouse and pond farms, orchards, vegetable gardens, chicken coops, cowsheds, stables, etc. There are also plans to build a wharf complex. However, even this project does not take into account the need to preserve the natural complexes of the National Park.

The third idea for tourism development in the reserve is the 'Zhigulevsky Ark - Belogorye' tourist and recreational complex project. The project aims to use the national park resources sparingly. The plan is to develop a museum and hotel complex, a children's park, an arboretum, a horse farm, a farm, a crafts village, and a festival glade on a 35-hectare site. This is the only project that involved environmental scientists, as it was developed in collaboration with the Volga Basin Ecology Institute of the Russian Academy of Sciences.

== Research ==
The scientific research history of the Middle Volga Reserve is limited, consisting of only two volumes of the Red Book of the Samara Oblast and two monographs dedicated to the inventory of invertebrate animals and the rare floristic complex of the reserve. Other scientific research is ongoing and is reflected in separate scientific articles on the nature of the Middle Volga Reserve.

A distinct field of study concerns the examination of human influence on ecosystems. Trends in wildlife response to recreational activities are identified, and the results are used to develop recommendations for optimising nature management, as well as recommendations for neutralising the negative effects of recreational activities.

== Bibliograghy ==
- Краснобаев, Ю. П. (2009). "Средне-Волжский комплексный биосферный резерват: характеристика и основные задачи". Материалы VI междунар. науч.-практич. конф. «Татищевские чтения: актуальные проблемы науки и практики» (in Russian). Togliatti: Волжский университет имени В. Н. Татищева: 296–304.
- "Средне-Волжский комплексный биосферный резерват" (PDF). Вестник UNESCO. Комиссия Российской Федерации по делам ЮНЕСКО (in Russian) (12): 168–173. 2010. ISBN 978-5-901642-14-6.
