= Zhiguli Nature Reserve =

Strict nature reserve in Stavropol Oblast, Russia

- Russian: Жигулёвский заповедник имени И. И. Спрыгина (Also: Zhigulevsky Zapovednik "I.I. Sprygin")
- IUCN category Ia (strict nature reserve)
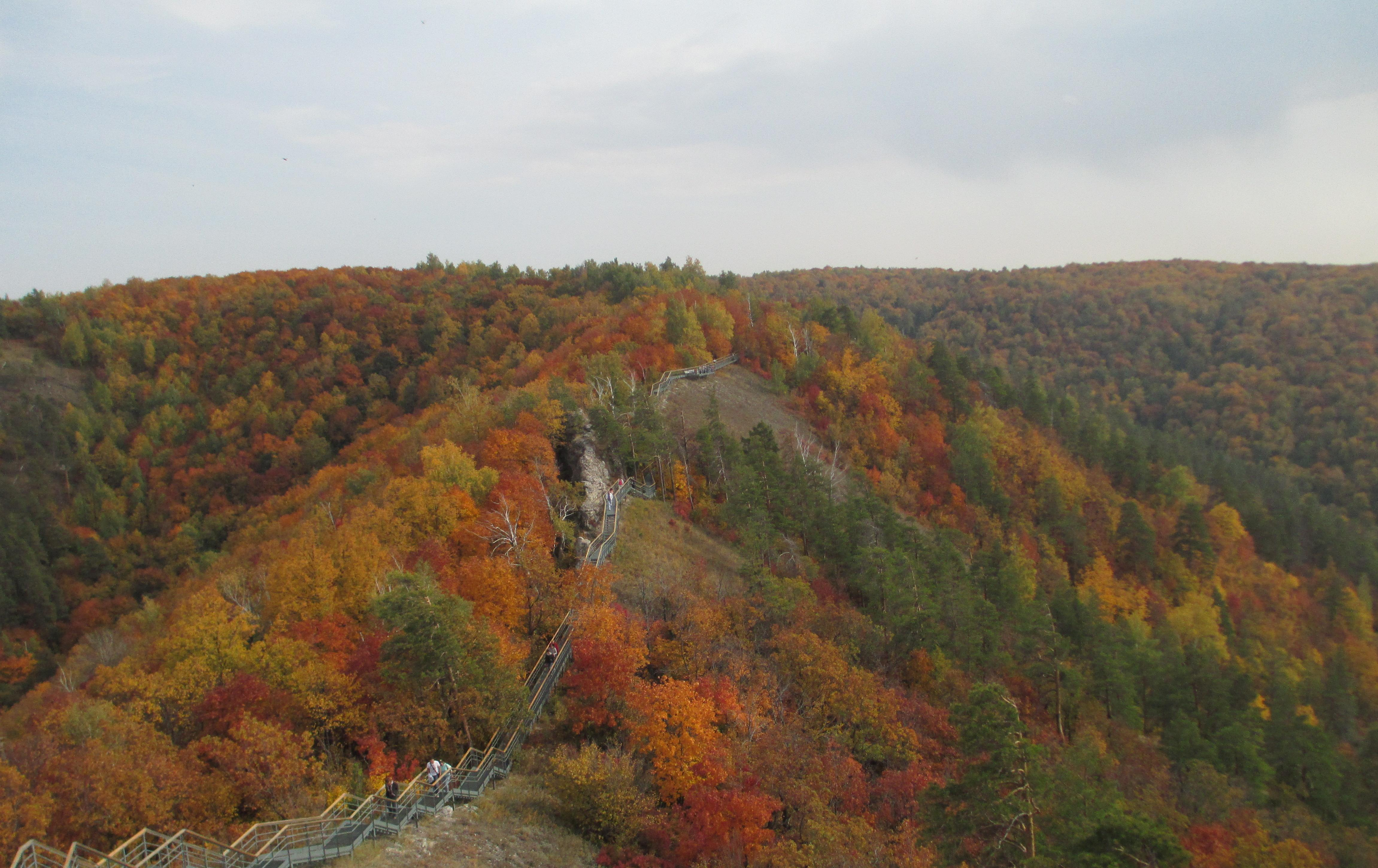
- Zhiguli Zapovednik

- Location within Russia
- Location: Samara Oblast
- Nearest city: Zhigulyovsk
- Coordinates: 53°24′54″N 49°49′17″E
- Area: 23,157 hectares (57,222 acres; 89 sq mi)
- Established: 1966
- Governing body: Ministry of Natural Resources and Environment (Russia)
- Website: http://zhreserve.ru/

The Zhiguli Nature Reserve (Russian: Жигулёвский заповедник им. И. И. Спрыгина; also Zhigulevsky) is a Russian 'zapovednik' (strict nature reserve) located on the Samara Bend in the Samara region, where the Volga River swings around the Zhiguli Mountains. The reserved is situated in the Stavropolsky District of Samara Oblast. The reserve is important because of its scientific value in the biodiversity of its closely placed variety of habitats. In 2007, the Zhiguli Reserve was added to the UNESCO Middle Volga Biosphere Reserve, along with the surrounding Samarskaya Luka National Park.

== Topography ==
The Zhiguli reserve covers the northern middle section of the Samara Bend peninsula. It is bordered on the north by the Kuybyshev Reservoir of the Volga River, and on the west, south and east by Samarskaya Luka National Park. The entirety of the terrain is mountains, with small sections of lowland forest and coast on the reservoir. The ridge within the reserve gradually increases from 250 m in height in the west, to 371 m in the center, then decreases to 250 meters on the eastern border. The ridge is cut by two valleys: the Bakhilova Polyana, and a ravine.

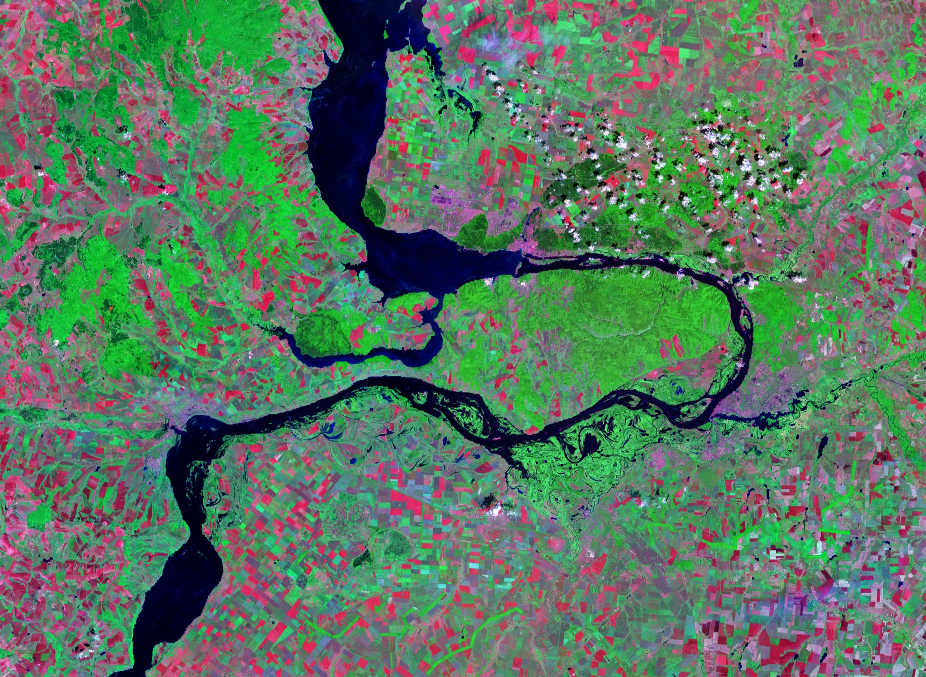
Satellite image of the Samara Bend in the Volga River. The Zhiguli Reserve is the dark green on the north-central section of the peninsula

.

== Climate and ecoregion ==
Zhiguli is located in the East European forest steppe ecoregion. This ecoregion is a transition zone between the broadleaf forests of the north and the grasslands to the south; it is characterized by a mosaic of forests, steppe, and riverine wetlands.

The climate of Zhiguli is Humid continental climate, warm summer (Köppen climate classification (Dfb)). This climate is characterized by large swings in temperature, both diurnally and seasonally, with mild summers and cold, snowy winters.

== Flora and fauna ==
The reserve is covered 94% by mixed coniferous-deciduous and deciduous forests. The remainder is grassland steppe and grass-forb meadows. The limestone and chalk mountains support some virgin steppe pine forest, with representative rocky steppe habitat, sphagnum bogs, floodplain oak and osokorevo-vetlovye forests, and willow thickets. Biodiversity is high and packed into a small area: although Zhiguli is only 0.16% of the Samara region, it contains over 1,000 of the 1,500 higher plant species of the region. 50 species of plants on the site are relics, surviving from previous geological ages. Among the mammals, the reserve is notable for its large number and variety of small rodents, such as the bank vole and the yellow-necked mouse.

== History ==
The Zhiguli Reserve was first officially established in 1927, and has undergone changes in name, status and boundaries since that time. Originally formed as Srednevolzhskiy Reserve in 1927 for scientific research, it was reorganized and renamed Kuibyshev Reserve in 1938 with an expanded focus on forestry managed. During this time, exotic species were introduced, such as the Sika deer and the Amur Cork Tree (Phellodendron amurense), with damaging consequences for the pristine nature of the native plants and animals. During the 1940s, further degradation occurred as commercial oil drilling was introduced to the territory. The reserve was closed in 1961, but re-established in 1966. In 1977, the reserve was officially renamed in honor of Ivan Sprygin, the pioneering naturalist of the Samara Region, and the first director of the Zhiguli Reserve.

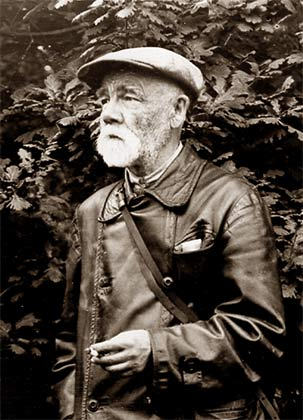
Ivan Sprygin, pioneering botanist for whom the Zhiguli Reserve is officially named

== Ecotourism ==
As a strict nature reserve, the Zhiguli Reserve is mostly closed to the general public, although scientists and those with 'environmental education' purposes can make arrangements with park management for visits. There are two 'ecotourist' routes in the reserve, however, that are open to the public, but require permits to be obtained in advance. The first public route is a car tour to Strelna Mountain, the other is a hike to the "Stone Bowl" (karst formation). Excursions must be made in the presence of reserve officers, and cannot last more than four hours.

== See also ==
- List of Russian Nature Reserves (class 1a 'zapovedniks')
