= Samarskaya Luka National Park =

National park in Russia

- Национальный парк "Самарская Лука" (Also: Samara Bend)
- IUCN category II (national park)
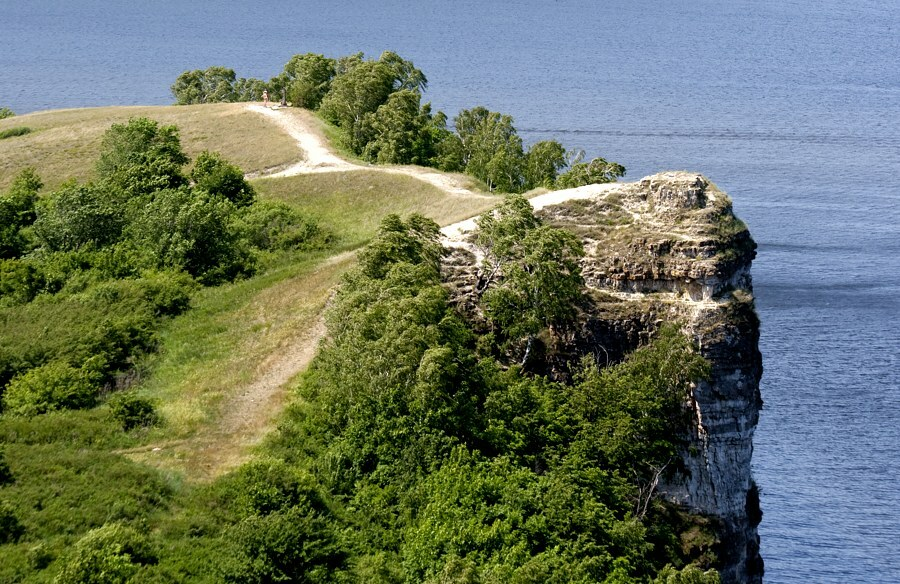
- Deviat Mound, Samara Bend

- Location within Russia
- Location: Samara Oblast
- Nearest city: Zhigulyovsk
- Coordinates: 53°18′N 49°50′E
- Area: 134,000 hectares (331,121 acres; 517 sq mi)
- Established: 1984
- Governing body: Ministry of Natural Resources and Environment (Russia)
- Website: http://www.npsamluka.ru/

The Samarskaya Luka National Park (Russian: Национальный парк "Самарская Лука", lit. 'Samara Bend national park') covers most of the peninsula formed by the 180-degree bend of the Volga River as it flows around the Zhiguli Mountains, near the cities of Samara and Zhigulyovsk in the Stavropolsky District, Samara Oblast. The north shore of the bend is on the Kuybyshev Reservoir, the south side is on the Saratov Reservoir, and on the north it has a border with Zhiguli Nature Reserve. The park is culturally important because of its centrality to a range of peoples back to ancient times, and to its scientific value resulting from the biodiversity of its closely placed variety of habitats. The territory is part of the Middle Volga Integrated Biosphere Reserve.

== Topography ==
The Samara Bend is located at the meeting zone of two geological regions: the Volga Uplands, and the Lower Volga Lowlands. In the Volga Uplands, a region of hills on the East European Plain, the park is found on the northeast edge. Across the Volga on the left bank are the Volga Lowlands, a tectonic trough of clay and sand remaining from the ancient Caspian Sea. The Kuybyshev and Saratov reservoirs of the Volga form the north and south borders of the park.

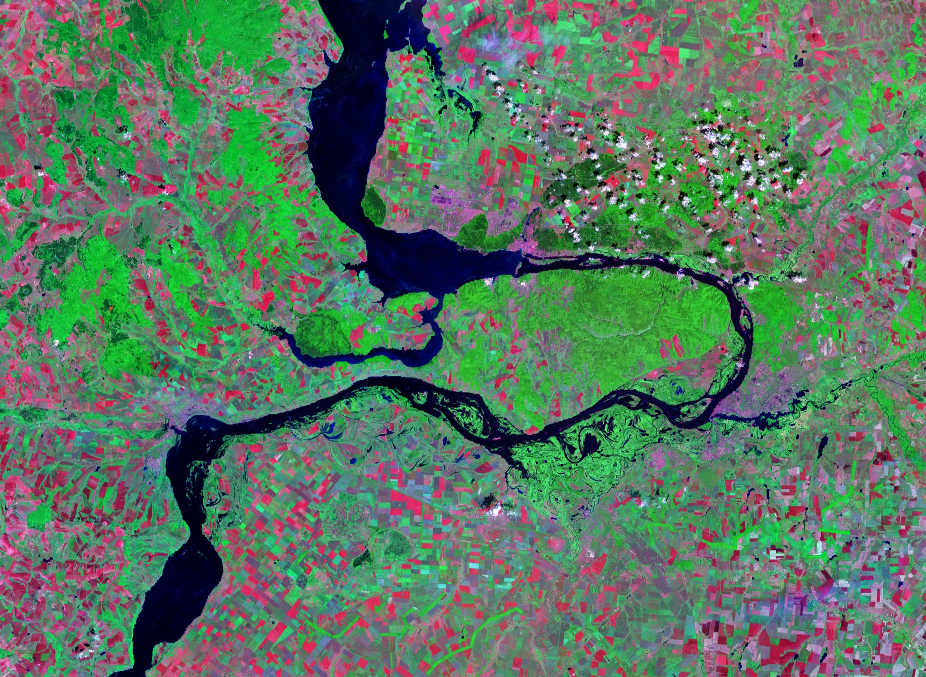
The Samara Bend of the Volga River. The Samarskaya Luka National Park (false color) covers the entire peninsula, except for the middle north section (full green), which is the strict nature reserve Zhuigili

The Volga's detour around the Zhiguli mountains is almost 200 km in length. The Zhiguli, and most of the bedrock in the park, is a karst (limestone) formation, averaging about 300 meters in height. About 18% of the Samara Bend National Park is in the mountainous Zhiguli on the north, 8% is on Volga floodplains to the south, and the remainder is forest and forest-steppe. In the eastern part of the park, the weathering of the limestone has left more than 500 craters over 1 meter to 100 meters in width, and 1 meter to 20 meters in depth.

== Ecoregion and climate ==
East European forest steppe ecoregion. Samarskaya Luka NP is approximately in the center of the ecoregion.

Samarskaya Luka lies in the East European forest steppe ecoregion (WWF ID#419), a transition zone between the broadleaf forests of the north and the grasslands to the south, cutting across the middle of Eastern Europe from Bulgaria through Russia. This forest steppe ecoregion is characterized by a mosaic of forests, steppe, and riverine wetlands.

The climate in Samarskaya Luka is Humid continental climate, warm summer (Köppen climate classification (Dfb)). This climate is characterized by large swings in temperature, both diurnally and seasonally, with mild summers and cold, snowy winters. The coldest month is January (-10 C on average); the warmest month is July (+20 C). Average precipitation is 556 mm. The frost-free period is 156 days. The predominant winds are from the southwest.

Samara Bend, Samara Oblast, Russia

Climate chart (precipitation, max. and min. temperature)
J	F	M	A	M	J	J	A	S	O	N	D
1.3 16 4	0.9 17 4	1 29 15	1.1 52 35	1.3 69 48	1.8 77 56	2 80 60	1.7 77 57	1.5 66 46	1.7 48 34	1.5 31 22	1.4 20 9
- █ Average max. and min. temperatures in °F
- █ Precipitation totals in inches
- Source: GlobalSpecies.org
Metric conversion
J	F	M	A	M	J	J	A	S	O	N	D
33 −9 −16	23 −8 −16	25 −2 −9	28 11 2	33 20 9	46 25 14	51 27 16	43 25 14	38 19 8	43 9 1	38 −1 −6	36 −7 −13
- █ Average max. and min. temperatures in °C
- █ Precipitation totals in mm

== Flora ==
Because of the complexity and centrality of the habitats, biodiversity is high. Plant communities include Eastern European steppe, steppe pine forests, Eastern European deciduous forests, grasslands, and floodplains. Over 1,500 species of vascular plants have been recorded in the park's borders. The trees are almost all deciduous - 97%, with linden, oak and birch the most common. The 3% conifers are in small stands of sparse Scots pine found on the higher slopes and on limestone.

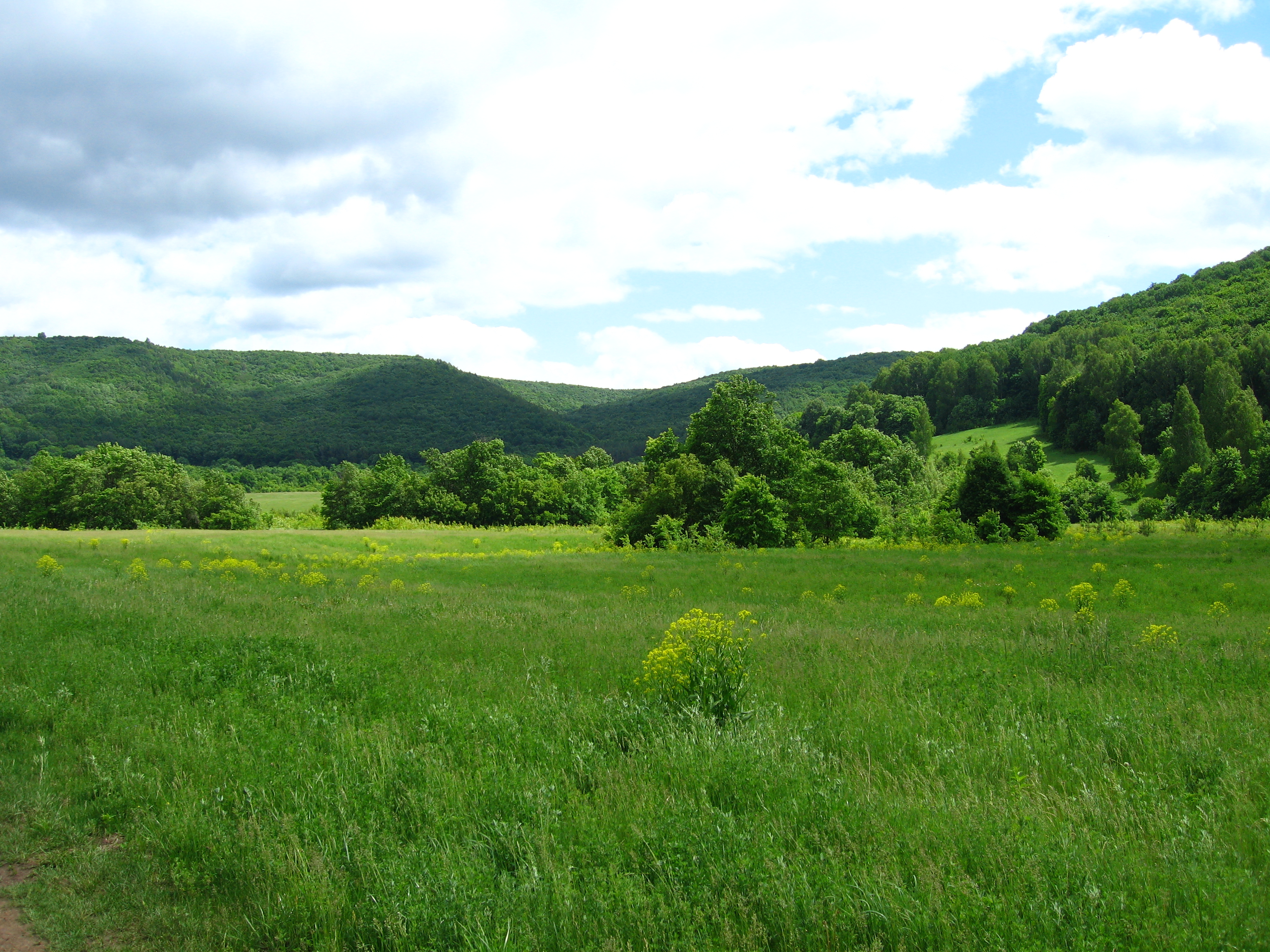
Zhiguli hills, northeast sector of Samaraskaya Luka

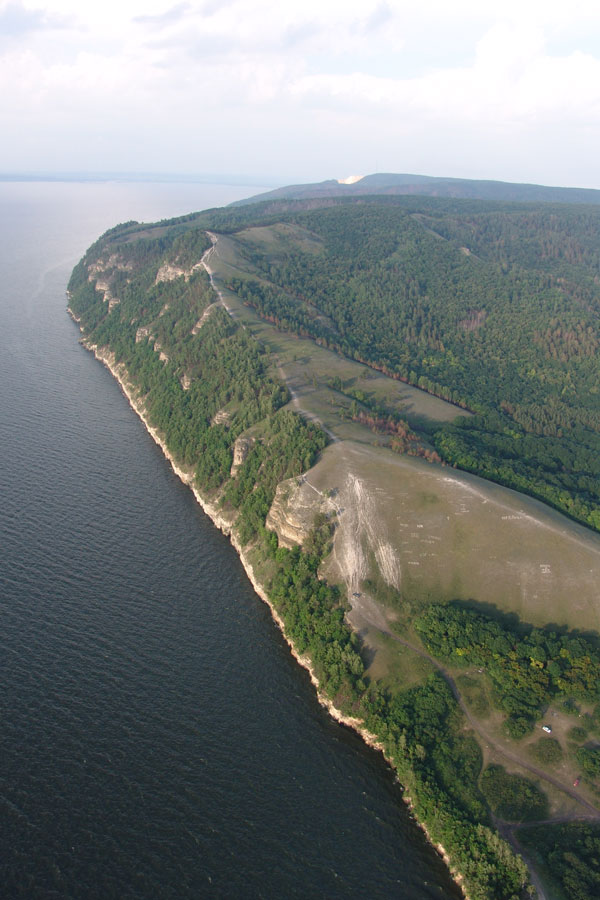
Molodetsky Kurgan ("Valiant Barrow"), on the northwest of Samara Bend, looking east

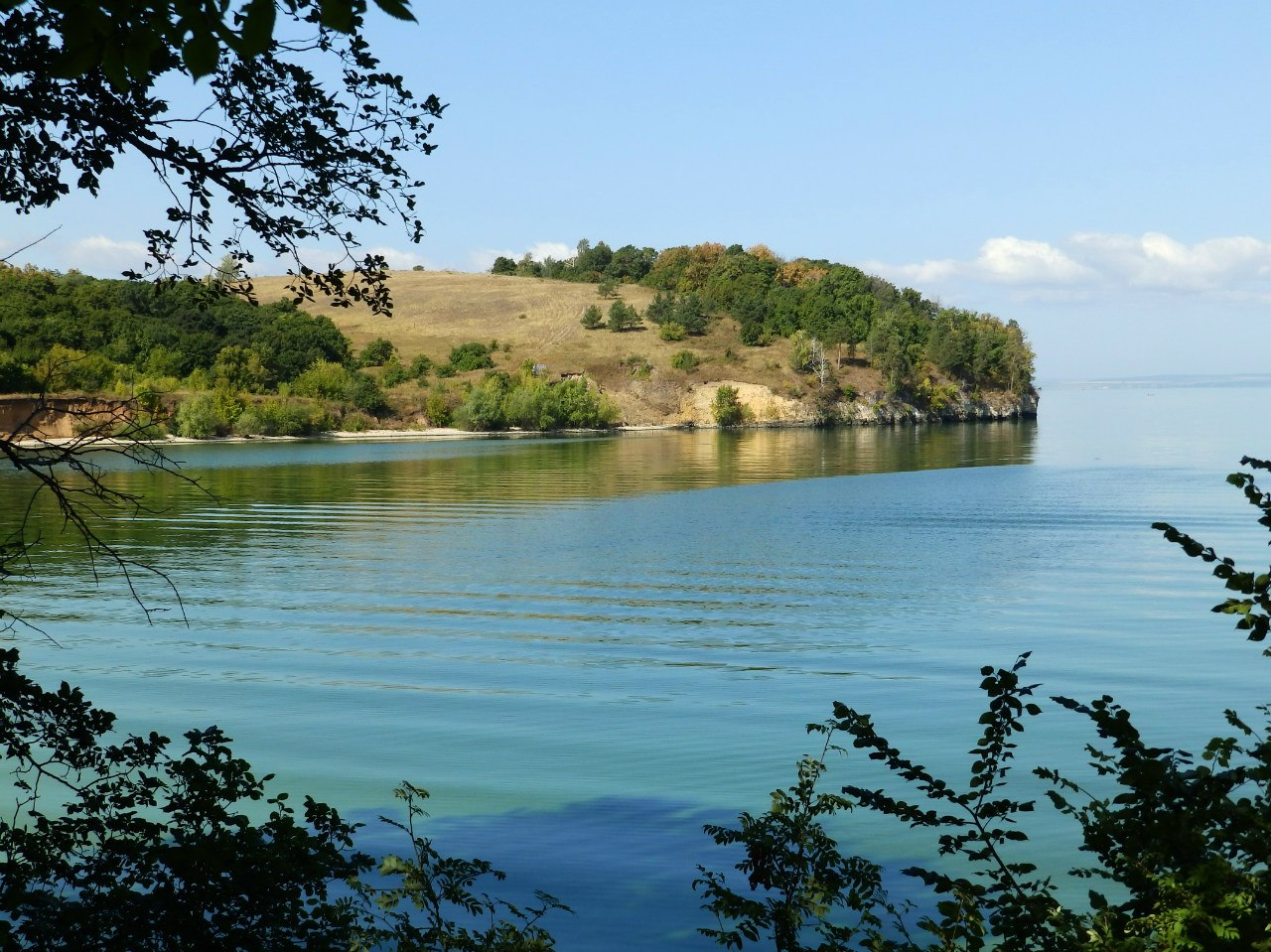
Usinsk Mound, far northwest point of the park

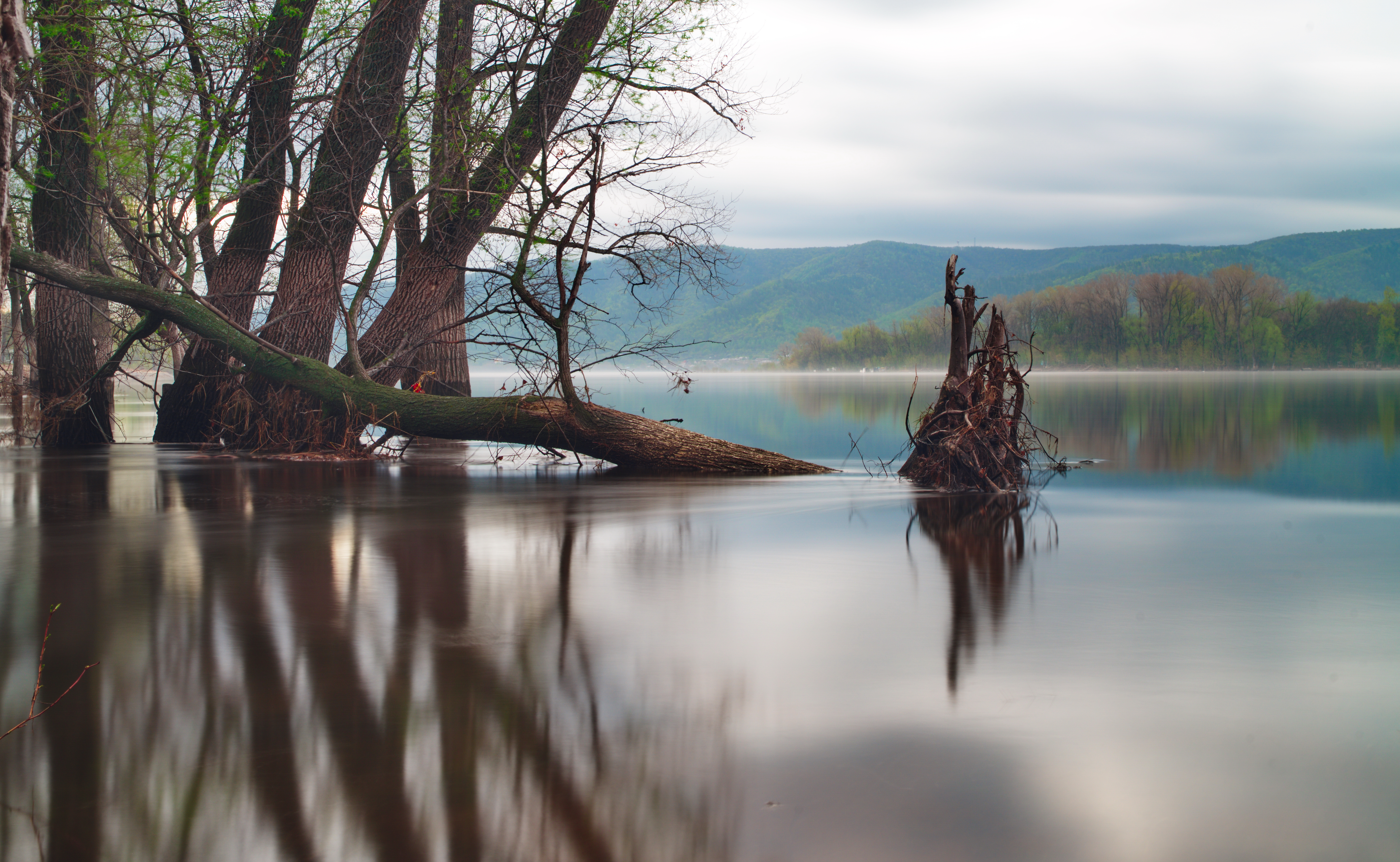
Freshet on Volga River within the park

== Fauna ==
A noteworthy feature of the vertebrates in the park is that 30% of the species are living at the edge of their historical ranges. The result is that northern taiga species, such as the Ural owl, can be found in close proximity to southern steppe species such as the European bee-eater.

== Tourism ==
The park is popular with tourists for hiking and recreation. Tickets can be purchased at travel agencies in the area; the park's website provides a list. Group tickets and guided tours must be arranged through the office in Samara. Camping and fires are not permitted along the trails and protected zones of the park.

Popular trails and landmarks include:

- Molodetsky Kurgan. A 200-meter high ridge that runs along the Volga on the northwest border of the park.
- Deviat Hill. A limestone promontory off the west end of the Molodetsky Ridge.
- Usinsk Mound. ("Cake Hill"). Opposite Deviat Hill on a small bay.
- Stone Bowl Tract. Area of limestone depressions and mineral springs, with a small chapel of St. Nicholas (included on the pilgrimage route of holy sites in Samara).
- Museum Tour. There are six museums on the site of the park, dedicated to cultural and natural features of the Samara Bend and its history.
- Witch Lake Trail. 2 km ecological trail, appropriate for children, with interpretive signs about the natural setting and the ancient myths of the region.
- Stepan Razin's Caves. Limestone caves with history and legend.

The Samarskaya Luka area has six museums, notably Ilya Repin's house. This museum is situated in Shiryaevo on the right bank of the Volga. Repin lived in this village for several months. It is there that he started painting his masterpiece “Barge Haulers on the Volga”.

== See also ==
- Protected areas of Russia
