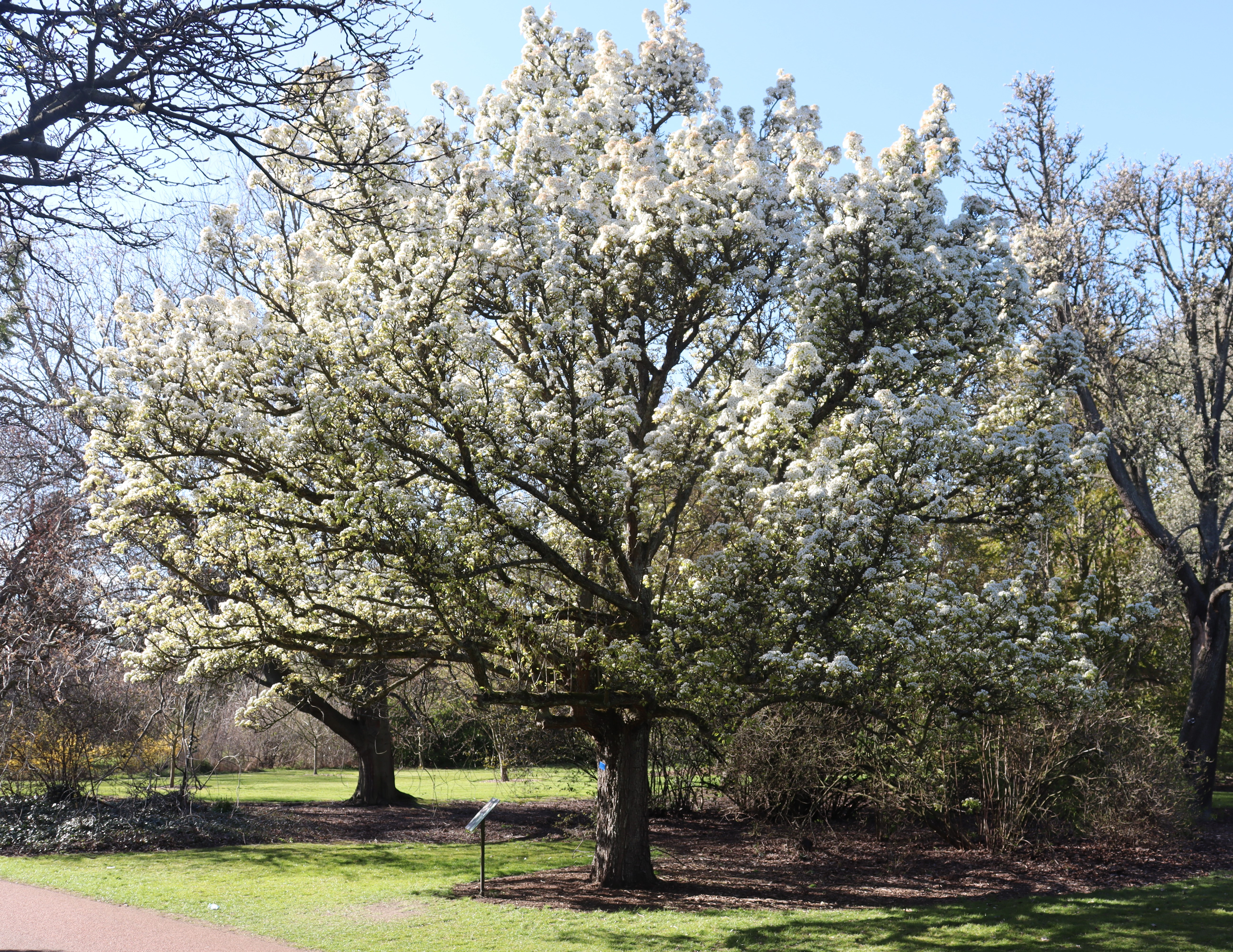

Conservation status
- Critically Endangered (IUCN 3.1)

Scientific classification
- Kingdom: Plantae
- Clade: Tracheophytes
- Clade: Angiosperms
- Clade: Eudicots
- Clade: Rosids
- Order: Rosales
- Family: Rosaceae
- Genus: Pyrus
- Species: P. korshinskyi

Binomial name
- Pyrus korshinskyi Litv.

= Pyrus korshinskyi =

Species of pear tree

Pyrus korshinskyi, also known as the Kazak pear or Bukharan pear, is a wild species of pear tree native to Central Asia, including Afghanistan, Kyrgyzstan, Tajikistan, and Uzbekistan. The Kazak pear is in the genus Pyrus (Rosaceae). The IUCN categorises the pear as critically endangered, with it surviving in remote areas with threats including over grazing, harvesting, and use for rootstock. Genetically the pear has potential use for reducing the impact of disease on domesticated pears. The species is named after Russian botanist Sergei Korzhinsky.
