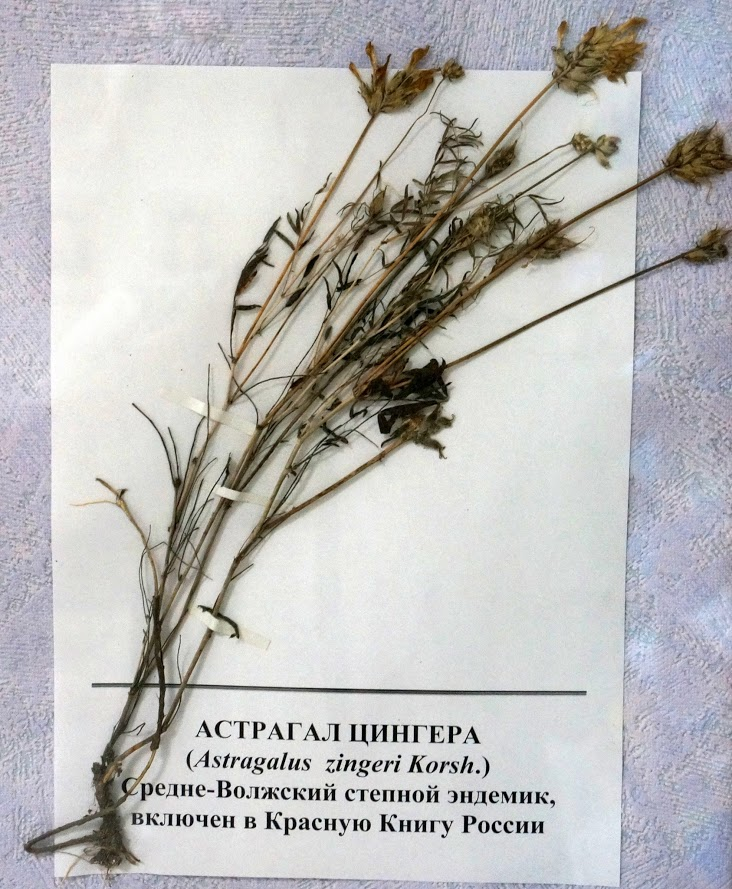

Scientific classification
- Kingdom: Plantae
- Clade: Tracheophytes
- Clade: Angiosperms
- Clade: Eudicots
- Clade: Rosids
- Order: Fabales
- Family: Fabaceae
- Subfamily: Faboideae
- Genus: Astragalus
- Species: A. zingeri

Binomial name
- Astragalus zingeri Korsh.

Synonyms
- Astragalus zingeri var. violascens Popova

= Astragalus zingeri =

Species of flowering plant

Astragalus zingeri is a species of flowering plant in the family Fabaceae.

Astragalus zingeri is a rare herb or shrub. It is a perennial.

The species was first described by Sergei Korzhinsky in 1889.

== Distribution ==
Astragalus zingeri grows in temperate biomes. It is found in Kazakhstan (Aktobe and Oral) and European Russia (Samara, Penza, Saratov, Ulyanovsk, and Volgograd).
