= Alexei Semyonov (ice hockey) =

Russian ice hockey player

- Born: December 10, 1986 (age 38) Zhigulevsk, Russia
- Height: 6 ft 0 in (183 cm)
- Weight: 201 lb (91 kg; 14 st 5 lb)
- Position: Goaltender
- Catches: Left
- KHL team: HC Lada Togliatti
- NHL draft: Undrafted
- Playing career: 2005–present

Alexei Semyonov (born December 10, 1986) is a Russian professional ice hockey goaltender. He is currently playing with HC Lada Togliatti of the Kontinental Hockey League (KHL).

Semyonov made his Kontinental Hockey League debut playing with HC Lada Togliatti during the 2009–10 KHL season.
