= Prunus korshinskyi =

Conservation status
- Vulnerable (IUCN 2.3)

Scientific classification
- Kingdom: Plantae
- Clade: Tracheophytes
- Clade: Angiosperms
- Clade: Eudicots
- Clade: Rosids
- Order: Rosales
- Family: Rosaceae
- Genus: Prunus
- Species: P. korshinskyi

Binomial name
- Prunus korshinskyi Hand.-Mazz.

Species of plant

Prunus korshinskyi (syn. Amygdalus korshinskyi (Hand.-Mazz.) Bornm.) is a species of Prunus in the family Rosaceae. It was first discovered in Syria, and is also locally native in Turkey and southeastern Europe. It is threatened by habitat loss. It is a deciduous shrub growing to 3.5 m tall, related to the almond. The species is named after Sergei Korzhinsky.

== Cultivation and uses ==
The seeds are edible though bitter, similar to a bitter almond. They can be used either raw or cooked.
