= Zhiguli Hydroelectric Station =

Zhiguli Dam
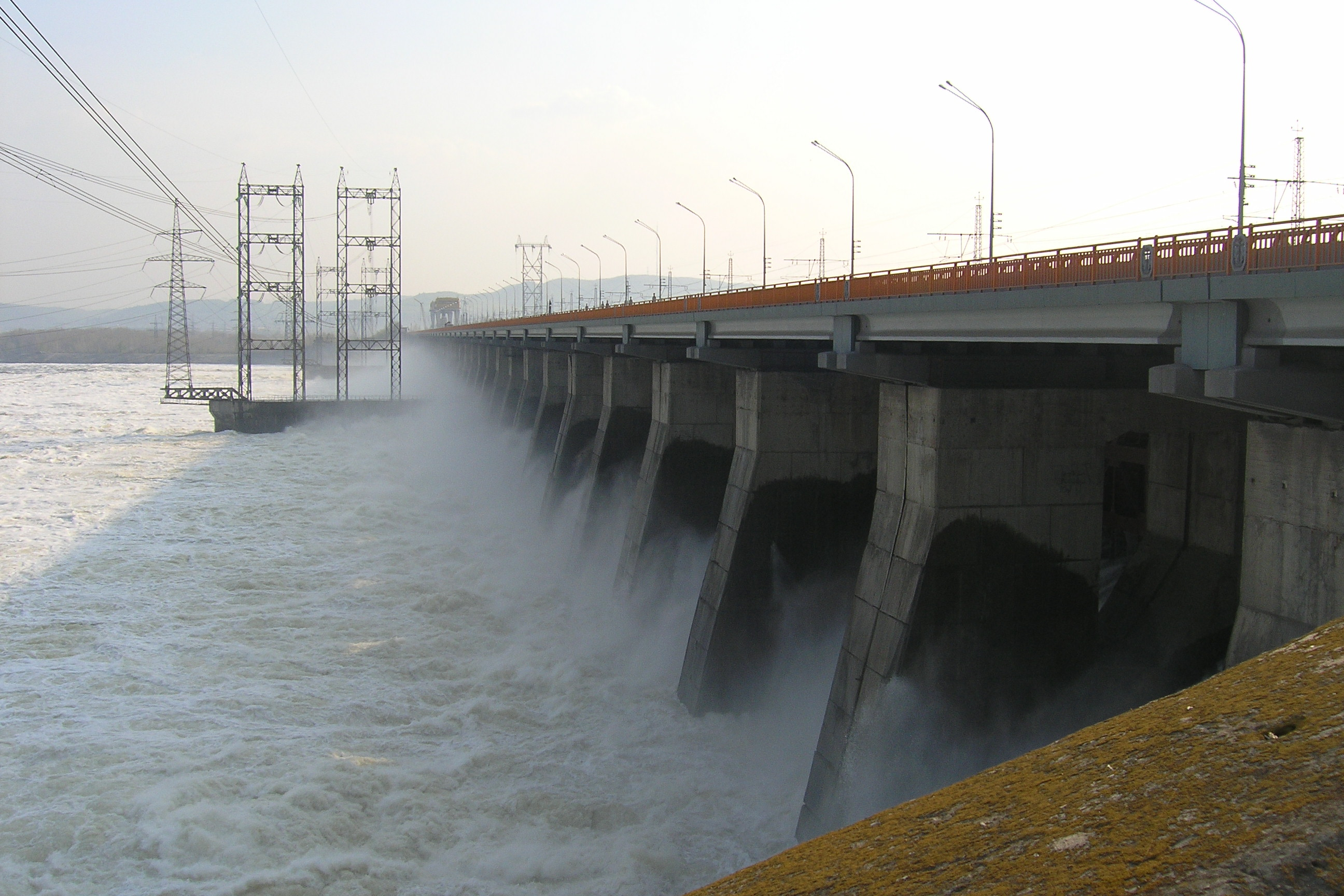

- Location within Russia
- Official name: Жигулёвская ГЭС
- Location: Zhigulyovsk; Russia
- Coordinates: 53°25′36″N 49°28′44″E
- Construction began: 1950
- Opening date: 1957
- Owner: RusHydro

Dam and spillways
- Type of dam: Embankment dam
- Impounds: Volga River
- Height: 52 m (171 ft)
- Length: 2,800 m (9,200 ft)
- Width (base): 750 m (2,460 ft)
- Spillway capacity: 40,000 m^{3}/s (1,400,000 cu ft/s)

Reservoir
- Creates: Kuybyshev Reservoir
- Total capacity: 57.3 km^{3} (13.7 mi^{3})
- Surface area: 6,450 km^{2} (2,490 mi^{2})
- Maximum water depth: 41 m (135 ft)

Power Station
- Turbines: 4 × 120 MW; 16 × 125,5 MW
- Installed capacity: 2,488 MW
- Annual generation: 11,815 GWh

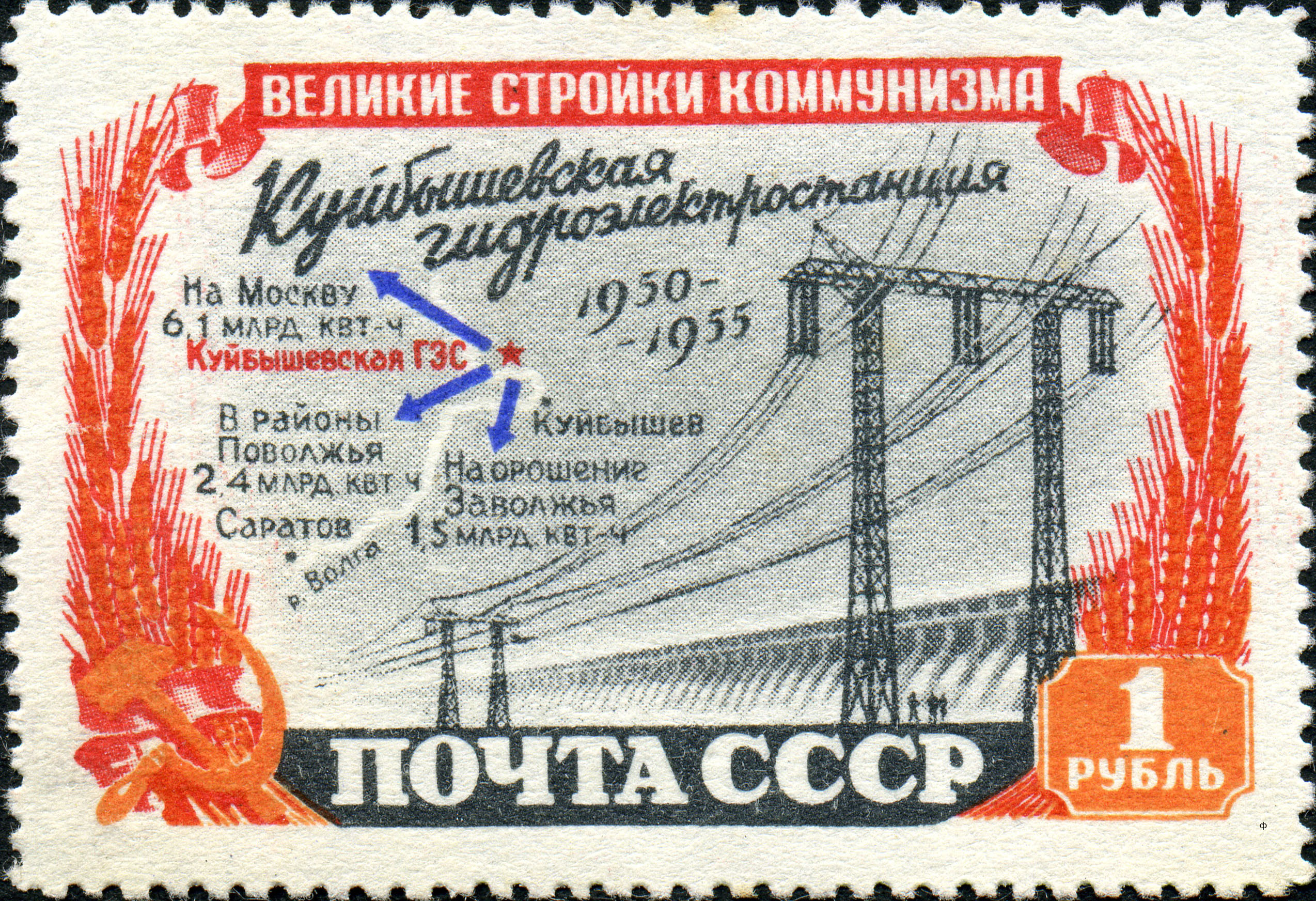
Kuybyshev Hydroelectric Station on a 1951 stamp

The Zhiguli Hydroelectric Station or Zhigulyovskaya Hydroelectric Station (Russian: Жигулёвская ГЭС, romanized: Zhigulyovskaya GES), formerly known as Kuybyshev Hydroelectric Station (Kuybyshev GES) is a large dam and hydroelectric station on the Volga River, located near Zhigulyovsk and Tolyatti in Samara Oblast of Russia. It is the sixth stage of the Volga-Kama Cascade of dams, and the second largest of them by installed power generating capacity.

== General data ==
Construction started in 1950 and was completed in 1957. The complex consists of earth-fill dam, 2800 m long, 750 m wide and 52 m high, concrete spillway dam, 980 m long, power plant house, 700 m long, and two-lane navigable locks. Installed power is 2,488 MW, average annual production is 11,700 GWh. The power house has 20 generator units with Kaplan turbines, 4 of 120 MW and 16 of 125.5 MW at 22.5 m head. The dam forms Kuybyshev Reservoir.

== Economic value ==
The station covers peak loads and maintains frequency stability in the unified power system of Russia (UES), controls flood and maintains navigable waterway. Lower hydroelectric stations are utilised more effectively because of seasonal and over-year regulation provided by the dam. Energy produced by station is transferred by four 500 KV lines – two of them to UES of central Russia and two to UES of the Urals and the Middle Volga.

== History ==
The idea of hydroelectric station on the Volga near Samara Bend was proposed by Gleb Krzhizhanovsky in 1910. Ten years later K. V. Bogoyavlensky proposed a hydroelectric station near Perevoloki, utilizing naturally existing water level difference. The disrupted economic system of the time did not allow this project to be realized.

In the early 1930s the Volga near Samara Bend and Yaroslavl was surveyed, and some dam projects were proposed. In 1937 the project of a dam near the villages of Perevoloki and Krasnaya Glinka was approved. Forced labour from Kuybyshev Camp was used (up to 40,000 people). In the autumn of 1940, oil fields were found near the construction site, causing a halt in construction.

The Hydroproject Institute made a survey in 1949, after which a decision was made to build the hydroelectric station near Zhigulyovsk. On 21 August 1950, the project to create a station with installed power of 2.1 gigawatts was approved. Construction was started, as before, with forced labour used. Construction was completed in 1957.

=== Locks ===
In July 1955 the first steamer vessel passed through the lower locks. The main stream of the Volga was shut off in November of that year, and the first turbine was put under load on 29 December 1955. In less than a year, by October 1956, 1000 gigawatthours of electric energy was produced. In 1956, 12 turbines were put under load and the next 7 in 1957. On 10 August 1958, the station was renamed after Vladimir Lenin, (Russian: Волжская ГЭС им. В. И. Ленина). In May 1959 all constructions were finished.

During construction the main stream of the Volga was shut in record time – in 19.5 hours during the period of minimal discharge ( 3800 m³/s ). Each turbine unit was mounted in an average of one month, half the usual time needed for that type of hydroelectric stations at that time. Later it was revealed that the turbines were actually able to run at an output of 115 megawatts instead of the 105 megawatts designed; this increased the produced power up to 2.3 gigawatts.

== See also ==
- List of power stations in Russia
