= Dmitry Sadovnikov =

Dmitry Nikolayevich Sadovnikov
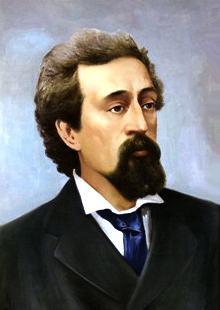
- Born: Дмитрий Николаевич Садовников; 7 May 1847; Ryazan, Russian Empire
- Died: 31 December 1883 (aged 36); Saint Petersburg, Russian Empire
- Occupations: poet, folklorist, ethnographer
- Spouse: Varvara Lazareva

Dmitry Nikolayevich Sadovnikov (Russian: Дмитрий Николаевич Садовников; 7 May 1847 – 31 December 1883) was a Russian poet, folklorist and ethnographer.

His major works include the compilations Riddles of the Russian People (Zagadki russkogo naroda, 1876) and Skazki i predaniya Samarskogo kraya (Fables and legends of the Samara region, 1884). His most famous work is the ballad Stenka Razin and the Persian Princess, which became a popular song.

== Works ==
Notable works include :

- «Русская земля, Жегули и Усолье на Волге» [Russian land, Zheguli and Usolye on the Volga], (in journal «Беседа», 1872, No. 11 и 12),
- «Подвиги русских людей» [Heroic deeds of Russian people] (in «Грамотей», 1873, No. 1, 2, 3, 8, 11 и 12)
- «Загадки русского народа» [The Mysteries of Russian People] (1876)
- «Языческие сны русского народа» [The Pagan Dreams of Russia] (1882), text book
- «Наши землепроходцы» [Our Explorers] (1874, 2nd ed. 1897), text book
- «Из летней поездки по Волге» [From a summer trip along the Volga] (in «Век», 1883, Book I)
- «Сказки и предания Самарского края» [Fables and Legends of the Samara Region] (in «Записки Императорского Русского географического общества» [Imperial Russian Geographical Society journal] vol.12) (1884)

He also wrote poetry under the pseudonyms "D. Volzhanin" and "Zhanrist".

== Legacy ==
The poetic legacy of Sadovnikov who died in poverty and has never received wide recognition, is generally underrated. For one, D.S. Mirsky considered him "worthy of mention", and claimed him to be the second Russian poet of the 1870s after Nekrasov.

Sadovnikov has never received due credit even for his most famous poem, Stenka Razin and the Persian Princess, also known by the incipit: Iz-za ostrova na strezhen (From behind the island in the channel). Set to a popular folk melody, this piece about ataman Stenka Razin is widely considered to be part of Russian musical folklore.
