= Sergei Korzhinsky =

Russian botanist (1861–1900)

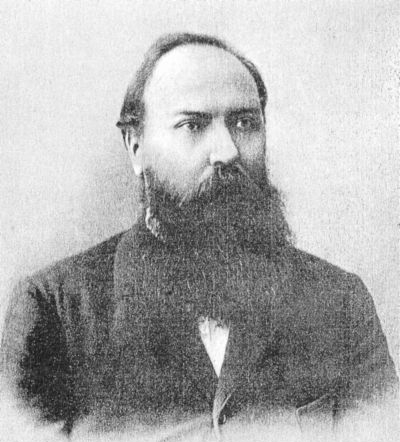

Sergei Ivanovich Korzhinsky (Сергей Иванович Коржинский; also transliterated as Sergei Ivanovitsch Korshinsky; 26 August (7 September) 1861, Astrakhan – 18 November (1 December) 1900, Saint Petersburg) was a Russian botanist who proposed, in 1899, a mutation theory in evolution ("theory of heterogenesis"), which he thought was more accurate than Darwin's. A similar theory was developed, independently, by Hugo de Vries.

At the age of 35 he was elected an academician of the Saint Petersburg Academy of Sciences (one of the first Siberian scientists to be so honored). He died before reaching the age of 40. Several plant species, such as Pyrus korshinskyi and Prunus korshinskyi, are named in his honor, typically bearing the epithet korshinskyi.

== Life and contributions ==
As a young researcher, Korzhinsky studied the flora of the Volga Delta and the arid Astrakhan steppes. He graduated from Kazan University in 1885 and served as a professor at Tomsk University from its inception in 1888 to 1892. He became the first director of the Siberian Botanical Garden, established at Tomsk University. He conducted several scientific expeditions in the Baraba and Kulunda steppes, and visited Lake Balkhash in 1890.

In 1892, he met the future Nicholas II of Russia (who was returning to the capital from Japan through Tomsk) and impressed him so much that Nicholas lobbied for him to be elected into the Academy of Sciences. Korzhinsky moved to Saint Petersburg to serve as a professor at the Bestuzhev Courses. He was appointed chief botanist of the Saint Petersburg Botanical Garden (1892) and director of the Botanical Museum (1893). He provided the first comprehensive description of Central Asian vegetation and proposed a general botanical-geographical zoning of Imperial Russia. Korzhinsky distributed a series of duplicate specimens called Plantae gubernii kasanensis and the exsiccata Herbarium Florae Rossicae, a Museo Botanico Academiae Imperialis Scientiarum Petropolitanae editum, the latter in 1900.

A pioneer of phytocoenology, Korzhinsky developed the theory of forest encroachment on steppes and advanced the geographic-morphological method in plant systematics, alongside a method of historical flora analysis. He introduced the concept of "race" in plant taxonomy and initiated the publication of the Herbarium of Russian Flora in 1898. In Crimea, Korzhinsky studied 112 grape varieties, providing not only botanical descriptions but also practical evaluations, which formed the basis for the first Ampelography of Crimea (with an atlas of illustrations), published posthumously in 1909.

His son, Dmitry Korzhinsky (1899–1985), became a prominent geologist, academician, and Lenin Prize laureate.
