= Zhiguli Mountains =

Mountain range in Russia

Zhiguli
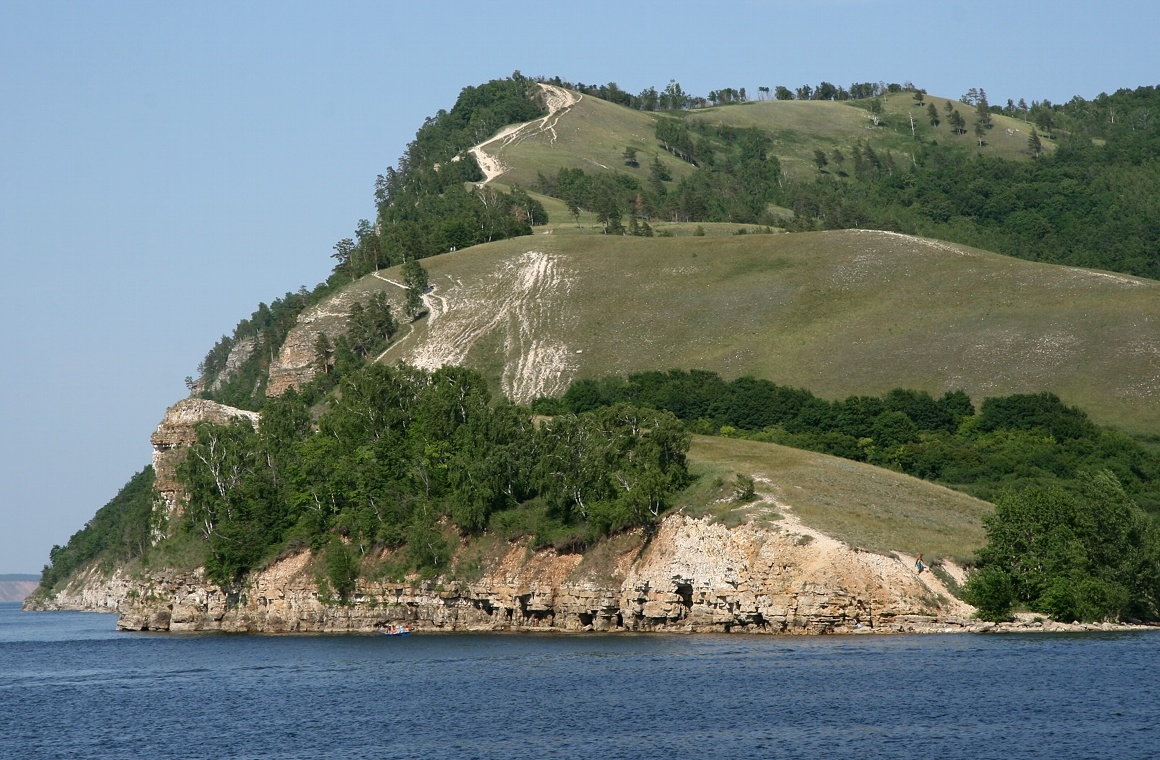
- View to Zhiguli from the Volga River

Highest point
- Peak: Nablyudatel
- Elevation: 381.2 m (1,251 ft)

Dimensions
- Length: 60 km (37 mi)
- Width: 32 km (20 mi)

Geography
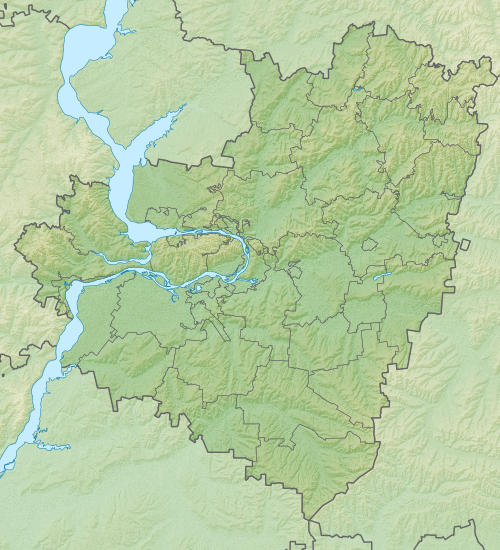
- Location within Samara Oblast Location within European Russia
- Country: Russia
- Region: Samara Oblast
- Range coordinates: 53°25′N 49°30′E
- Parent range: Volga Upland

The Zhiguli Mountains (Russian: Жигулëвские горы) or simply Zhiguli (Russian: Жигули́, IPA: [ʐɨɡʊˈlʲi]), are a range of wooded mountains located in Russia on the right bank of the Volga River, inside the Samara Bend. The mountains are an important source of limestone and oil (extracted since World War II) and are also popular as a scenic area for local and regional tourism. Their altitude reaches a maximum of 381.2 m (1,251 ft). The range is named for a nearby town Zhigulyovka (no longer extant), itself probably named for an early inhabitant, Zhegul (Russian: Жегуль). Formerly, the range was known as the Lada, after the river pirate boats (ладья) who used to hide out in its wooded valleys, a name which is still in popular local usage.

== Geography and geology ==
The range's topography is skewed from north to south: the northern slopes drop very abruptly down to the Volga River, while to the south the hills descend much more gently, forming a wide plateau dissected by a labyrinth of narrow valleys and gullies. The western part of Zhiguli is separated from the main plateau by the broad inlet of the Usa river. The central, highest part of the Zhiguli is an almost flat plateau, which also forms the highest point in the entire central zone of European Russia.

The Zhiguli are considered the only tectonically active mountains in European Russia, first having formed around 7 million years ago. The summits and other exposed areas of the Zhiguli are composed of limestone and dolomite sediments laid down 230–350 million years ago, in the Permian and Carboniferous periods. The slopes of Zhiguli are mostly formed from products of aeration of the Permian and Carboniferous bedrock.

== See also ==
- Zhigulyovsk
- Zhiguli Hydroelectric Station
- Zhiguli (car brand)
- Lysaya Mountain
