= Samara Bend =

Large hairpin bend of the middle Volga river

Coordinates: 53°07′N 50°04′E

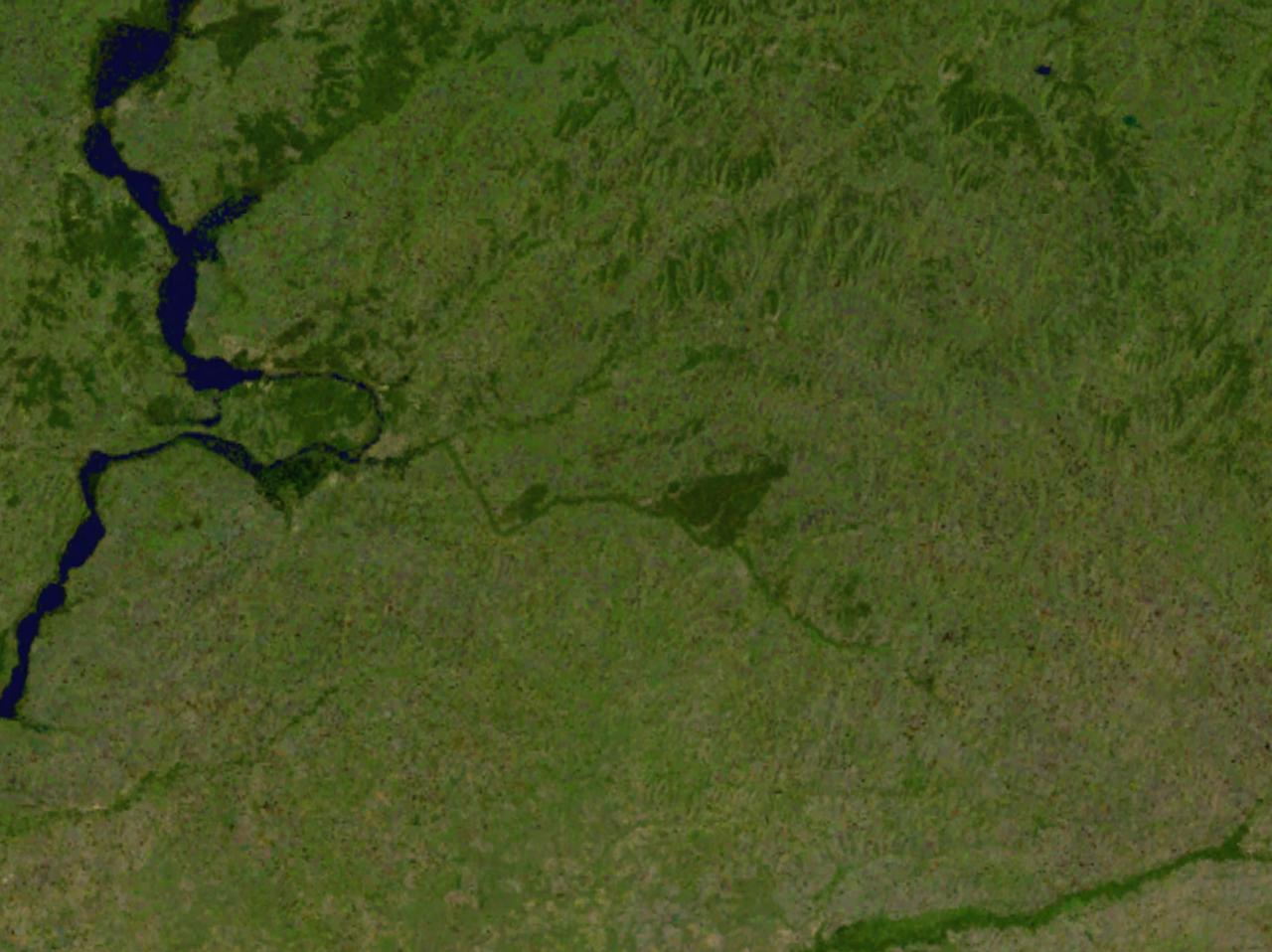
Samara Bend and Samara River from space.

The Samara Bend (Samarskaya Luka; Russian: Самарская Лука) is a large hairpin bend of the middle Volga River to the east where it meets the Samara River. It is situated in the Samara region of Russia.

As the Volga enters its middle course it reaches the Zhiguli Mountains. The Samara Bend is formed as the river circles these hills. The Samara Bend National Park, one of the first in the USSR, was established in 1984. Some pockets of the park's territory are among the northernmost points of the Great European Steppe.

The Samara Bend is noted for a remarkable succession of archaeological cultures from 7000 BC to 4000 BC. These sites have revealed Europe's earliest pottery (Elshanka culture), the world's oldest horse burial and signs of horse worship (the Syezzheye cemetery of Samara culture), and the earliest kurgans associated with Proto-Indo-Europeans (e.g., Krivoluchye assigned to Khvalynsk culture).

== See also ==
- Samara Bend National Park
- Battle of Samara Bend
- Lysaya Mountain (Zhiguli)
