= Zhigulevsk =

Zhigulevsk Жигулёвск
- Town
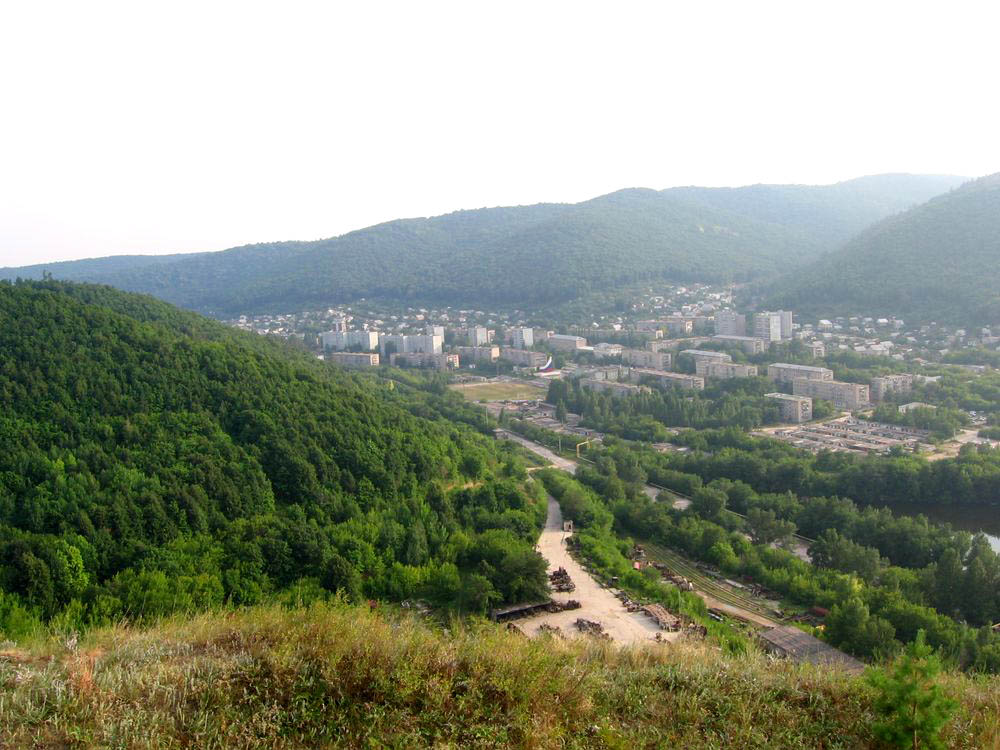
- Yablonevy Ovrag, a part of Zhigulyovsk

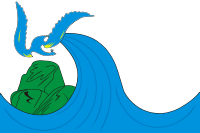
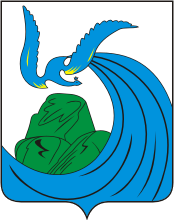
- Flag Coat of arms
- Interactive map of Zhigulevsk
- Location of Zhigulevsk Zhigulevsk (Samara Oblast)
- Coordinates: 53°23′59″N 49°29′43″E
- Country: Russia
- Federal subject: Samara Oblast
- Founded: 1949
- Town status since: 1952
- Elevation: 70 m (230 ft)

Population (2010 Census)
  - Total: 55,565
  - Estimate (2025): 48,070 (−13.5%)
  - Rank: 298th in 2010

Administrative status
  - Subordinated to: town of oblast significance of Zhigulevsk
  - Capital of: town of oblast significance of Zhigulevsk

Municipal status
  - Urban okrug: Zhigulevsk Urban Okrug
  - Capital of: Zhigulevsk Urban Okrug
- Time zone: UTC+4 (MSK+1)
- Postal code: 445350
- OKTMO ID: 36704000001
- Website: www.zhigulevsk.org

Zhigulevsk (Russian: Жигулёвск, IPA: [ʐɨɡʊˈlʲɵfsk]) is a town in Samara Oblast, Russia, located on the right bank of the Volga River in the Samara Bend near the Zhiguli Mountains, 92 kilometers (57 mi) west of Samara. The population was 55,565 (2010 census); 48,770 (2002 census); 44,801 (1989 Soviet census).

== Etymology ==
The name Zhigulevsk is taken from the Zhiguli Mountains, but they are named for an earlier settlement of Zhigulevka, itself probably named for an early inhabitant, Zhegul (Жегуль).

== History ==
The town occupies the territories of former villages of Otvazhnoye (Отва́жное, known since 1840) and Morkvashi (Моркваши, known since 1647). The work settlement of Otvazhny (Отва́жный) was built here to develop the oil deposits. In 1949, it was merged with the villages and renamed Zhigulevsk. It was granted town status in 1952.

Besides oil, the town also develops limestone deposits.

== Administrative and municipal status ==
Within the framework of administrative divisions, it is, together with five rural localities, incorporated as the town of oblast significance of Zhigulevsk—an administrative unit with the status equal to that of the districts. As a municipal division, the town of oblast significance of Zhigulevsk is incorporated as Zhigulevsk urban okrug.

== Notable people ==
- Alexei Semyonov, ice hockey goaltender
- Diana Shnaider, professional tennis player
