= Zhigulyovsk constituency =

Russian legislative constituency

Zhigulyovsk single-member constituency
- Constituency of the Russian State Duma
- Deputy: Andrey Trifonov; United Russia
- Federal subject: Samara Oblast
- Districts: Bezenchuksky, Chapayevsk, Khvorostyansky, Krasnoarmeysky, Oktyabrsk, Pestravsky, Privolzhsky, Shigonsky, Stavropolsky (Aleksandrovka, Bakhilovo, Bolshaya Ryazan, Khryashchevka, Lunacharsky, Osinovka, Sevryukayevo, Sosnovy Solonets, Vasilyevka, Verkhniye Belozerki, Yagodnoye, Zhiguli), Syzran, Syzransky, Tolyatti (Komsomolsky), Zhigulyovsk
- Voters: 439,616 (2026)

Zhigulyovsk constituency (No.162 (Note: Syzran constituency No.153 in 1993-1995, Syzran constituency No.154 in 1995-2007, No.161 in 2016–2026)) is a Russian legislative constituency in Samara Oblast. The constituency covers south-western Samara Oblast, including the industrial cities Syzran, Chapayevsk and Zhigulyovsk as well as eastern Tolyatti.

The constituency has been represented since 2021 by United Russia deputy Andrey Trifonov, former industrial machinery executive, who won the open seat after defeating one-term United Russia incumbent Yevgeny Serper in the primary.

== Boundaries ==
1993–1995 Syzran constituency: Chelno-Vershinsky District, Isaklinsky District, Kamyshlinsky District, Klyavlinsky District, Koshkinsky District, Krasnoyarsky District, Oktyabrsk, Pokhvistnevo, Pokhvistnevsky District, Sergiyevsky District, Shentalinsky District, Shigonsky District, Stavropolsky District, Syzran, Syzransky District, Yelkhovsky District, Zhigulyovsk
The constituency stretched from western to northern Samara Oblast, covering the cities Syzran, Zhigulyovsk, Oktyabrsk and Pokhvistnevo as well as Tolyatti suburbs and northern Samara exurbs. This seat also completely surrounded Tolyatti constituency.

1995–2007 Syzran constituency: Alexeyevsky District, Bezenchuksky District, Bogatovsky District, Bolshechernigovsky District, Bolsheglushitsky District, Borsky District, Khvorostyansky District, Krasnoarmeysky District, Neftegorsky District, Oktyabrsk, Pestravsky District, Shigonsky District, Stavropolsky District, Syzransky District, Syzran, Zhigulyovsk
The constituency was significantly altered following the 1995 redistricting, losing north-eastern Samara Oblast to Novokuybyshevsk constituency and northern Samara suburbs and exurbs – to Promyshlenny constituency. This seat instead gained rural southern and south-eastern parts of the region from Novokuybyshevsk constituency.

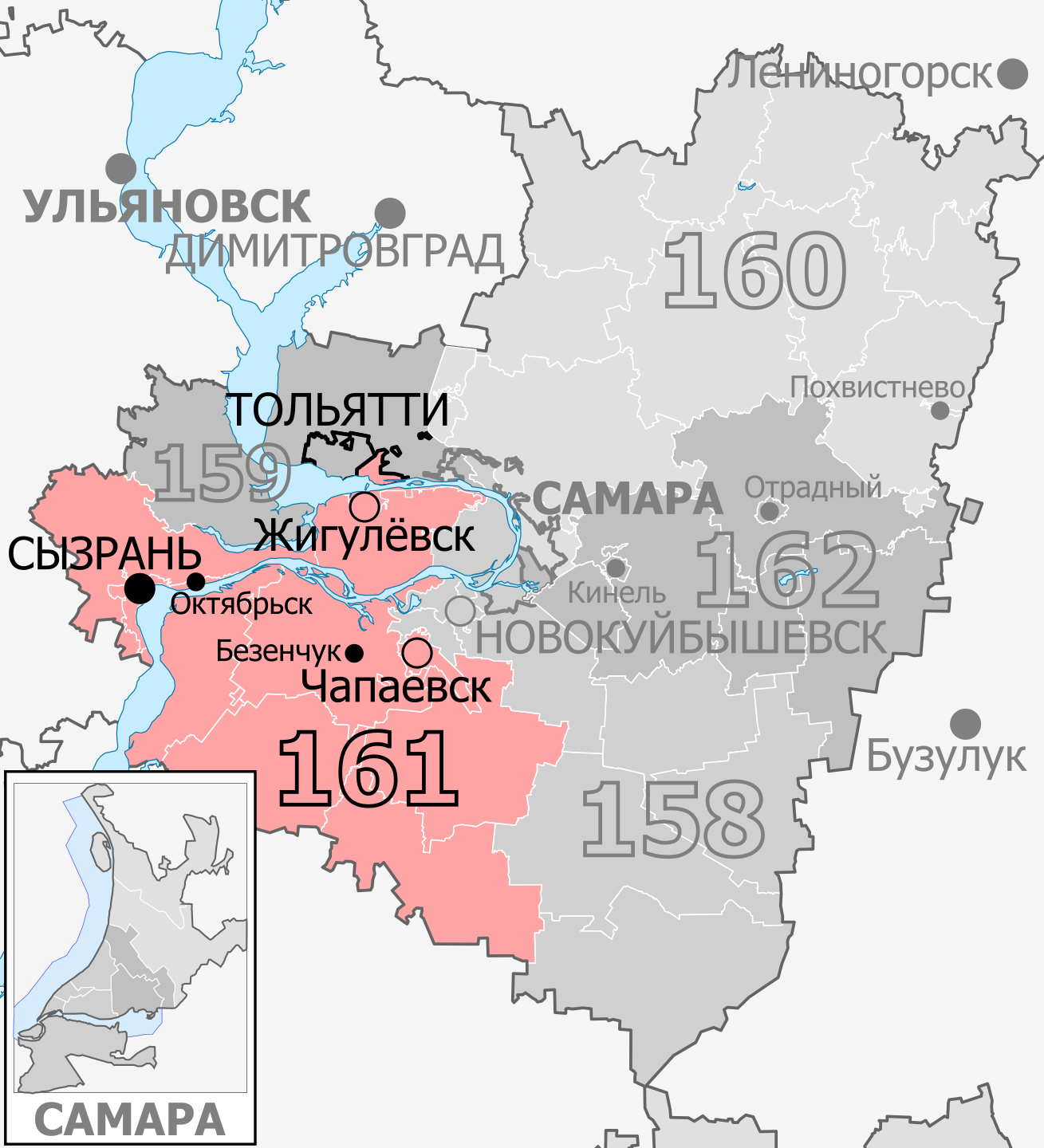
Constituency boundaries from 2016 to 2026

2016–2026: Bezenchuksky District, Chapayevsk, Khvorostyansky District, Krasnoarmeysky District, Oktyabrsk, Pestravsky District, Privolzhsky District, Stavropolsky District (Aleksandrovka, Bakhilovo, Bolshaya Ryazan, Osinovka, Sevryukaevo, Sosnovy Solonets, Vasilyevka, Zhiguli), Syzran, Syzransky District, Tolyatti (Komsomolsky), Zhigulyovsk
The constituency was re-created for the 2016 election under the name "Zhigulyovsk constituency" and retained most of its eastern portion, including Zhigulyovsk, Syzran and Oktyabrsk, losing Bogatovsky and Borsky districts to Promyshlenny constituency, southern corner of Samara Oblast – to Samara constituency, Shigonsky District and most of Tolyatti suburbs – to Tolyatti constituency. This seat instead gained eastern Tolyatti from Tolyatti constituency as well as the industrial city of Chapayevsk from the dissolved Novokuybyshevsk constituency.

2026–present: Bezenchuksky District, Chapayevsk, Khvorostyansky District, Krasnoarmeysky District, Oktyabrsk, Pestravsky District, Privolzhsky District, Shigonsky District, Stavropolsky District (Aleksandrovka, Bakhilovo, Bolshaya Ryazan, Khryashchevka, Lunacharsky, Osinovka, Sevryukayevo, Sosnovy Solonets, Vasilyevka, Verkhniye Belozerki, Yagodnoye, Zhiguli), Syzran, Syzransky District, Tolyatti (Komsomolsky), Zhigulyovsk
After the 2025 redistricting the constituency was slightly changed, gaining Shigonsky District and western part of Stavropolsky District from Tolyatti constituency.

== Members ==
| Election | Member | Party |
|---|---|---|
| 1993 | Yevgeny Gusarov | Independent |
| 1995 | Oleg Savitsky | Agrarian Party |
| 1999 | Vladimir Mokry | Independent |
| 2003 | Vladimir Mokry | United Russia |
| 2007 | Proportional representation - no election by constituency | |
| 2011 | Proportional representation - no election by constituency | |
| 2016 | Yevgeny Serper | United Russia |
| 2021 | Andrey Trifonov | United Russia |
| 2026 | Andrey Trifonov | United Russia |

== Election results ==
=== 1993 ===
Summary of the 12 December 1993 Russian legislative election in the Syzran constituency
| Candidate | Party | Votes | % |
|---|---|---|---|
| Yevgeny Gusarov | Independent | 63,067 | 22.06% |
| Sergey Asanin | Democratic Party | 43,353 | 15.16% |
| Valery Setezhev | Independent | 42,801 | 14.97% |
| Vladimir Belyakov | Independent | 33,660 | 11.77% |
| Vladimir Yemelyanov | Russian Democratic Reform Movement | 21,710 | 7.59% |
| Mark Feygin | Choice of Russia | 6,650 | 2.33% |
| against all | | 46,401 | 16.23% |
| Total | | 285,947 | 100% |

=== 1995 ===
Summary of the 17 December 1995 Russian legislative election in the Syzran constituency
| Candidate | Party | Votes | % |
|---|---|---|---|
| Oleg Savitsky | Agrarian Party | 116,679 | 37.44% |
| Valery Setezhev | Independent | 46,180 | 14.82% |
| Igor Bersenev | Our Home – Russia | 40,199 | 12.90% |
| Yevgeny Gusarov (incumbent) | Independent | 26,639 | 8.55% |
| Sergey Afanasyev | Independent | 21,455 | 6.88% |
| Aleksey Bazarov | Independent | 17,411 | 5.59% |
| Nikolay Gavrilov | Congress of Russian Communities | 16,842 | 5.40% |
| against all | | 20,630 | 6.62% |
| Total | | 311,655 | 100% |

=== 1999 ===
Summary of the 19 December 1999 Russian legislative election in the Syzran constituency
| Candidate | Party | Votes | % |
|---|---|---|---|
| Vladimir Mokry | Independent | 180,871 | 57.98% |
| Oleg Savitsky (incumbent) | Independent | 87,247 | 27.97% |
| Aleksandr Klishin | Liberal Democratic Party | 9,970 | 3.20% |
| Sergey Fedisov | Independent | 8,982 | 2.88% |
| against all | | 19,195 | 6.15% |
| Total | | 311,970 | 100% |

=== 2003 ===
Summary of the 7 December 2003 Russian legislative election in the Syzran constituency
| Candidate | Party | Votes | % |
|---|---|---|---|
| Vladimir Mokry (incumbent) | United Russia | 136,106 | 52.63% |
| Svetlana Kuzmina | Communist Party | 78,712 | 30.44% |
| Nikolay Yevtushenko | Liberal Democratic Party | 10,986 | 4.25% |
| Oleg Bartenev | Union of Right Forces | 3,976 | 1.54% |
| Yevgeny Mineyev | United Russian Party Rus' | 3,003 | 1.16% |
| against all | | 22,137 | 8.56% |
| Total | | 258,835 | 100% |

=== 2016 ===
Summary of the 18 September 2016 Russian legislative election in the Zhigulyovsk constituency
| Candidate | Party | Votes | % |
|---|---|---|---|
| Yevgeny Serper | United Russia | 125,805 | 47.89% |
| Aleksey Krasnov | Communist Party | 29,571 | 11.26% |
| Mikhail Usov | Liberal Democratic Party | 28,456 | 10.83% |
| Andrey Yevdokimov | Party of Growth | 17,926 | 6.82% |
| Nikolay Shishlov | A Just Russia | 14,900 | 5.67% |
| Mikhail Kapishin | Communists of Russia | 13,995 | 5.33% |
| Yulia Ivanova | The Greens | 7,233 | 2.75% |
| Igor Yermolenko | Yabloko | 4,682 | 1.78% |
| Oleg Svintsov | Patriots of Russia | 3,906 | 1.49% |
| Artem Tonkikh | People's Freedom Party | 3,431 | 1.31% |
| Total | | 262,704 | 100% |

=== 2021 ===
Summary of the 17-19 September 2021 Russian legislative election in the Zhigulyovsk constituency
| Candidate | Party | Votes | % |
|---|---|---|---|
| Andrey Trifonov | United Russia | 102,304 | 45.13% |
| Vasily Vorobyev | Communist Party | 48,304 | 21.31% |
| Mikhail Maryakhin | A Just Russia — For Truth | 16,400 | 7.24% |
| Tatyana Bodrova | Party of Pensioners | 15,889 | 7.01% |
| Dmitry Kopylov | Liberal Democratic Party | 14,867 | 6.56% |
| Anton Skorokhodov | New People | 10,461 | 4.62% |
| Lyudmila Shaposhnikova | Russian Party of Freedom and Justice | 4,425 | 1.95% |
| Denis Stukalov | The Greens | 4,268 | 1.88% |
| Total | | 226,669 | 100% |

=== 2026 ===
Summary of the 18-20 September 2026 Russian legislative election in the Zhigulyovsk constituency
| Candidate | Party | Votes | % |
|---|---|---|---|
| Andrey Trifonov (incumbent) | United Russia | 196,014 | 65.78% |
| Mikhail Usov | Communist Party | 38,776 | 13.01% |
| Vasily Gutnik | Liberal Democratic Party | 18,525 | 6.22% |
| Maksim Guseinov | A Just Russia | 17,960 | 6.03% |
| Sergey Pukhayev | New People | 16,694 | 5.60% |
| Total | | 297,995 | 100% |
