= Tolyatti constituency =

Russian legislative constituency

Tolyatti single-member constituency
- Constituency of the Russian State Duma
- Deputy: Leonid Kalashnikov; Communist Party
- Federal subject: Samara Oblast
- Districts: Stavropolsky (Kirillovka, Musorka, Nizhneye Sancheleyevo, Novaya Binaradka, Piskaly, Podstepki, Primorsky, Tashelka, Timofeyevka, Uzyukovo, Verkhneye Sancheleyevo, Vyselki), Tolyatti (Avtozavodsky, Tsentralny)
- Voters: 464,647 (2026)

Tolyatti constituency (No.160 (Note: No.154 in 1993-1995, No.155 in 1995-2007, No.159 in 2016–2026)) is a Russian legislative constituency in Samara Oblast. The constituency covers most of Tolyatti, home to AvtoVAZ car manufacturer, as well as surrounding rural areas.

The constituency has been represented since 2021 by Communist deputy Leonid Kalashnikov, five-term State Duma member and former energy executive, who won the open seat, succeeding one-term United Russia incumbent Vladimir Bokk. Kalashnikov has chaired the Duma Committee on Commonwealth of Independent States Affairs, Eurasian Integration, and Relations with Compatriots since October 2016.

== Boundaries ==
1993–2007: Tolyatti
The constituency covered the entirety of Tolyatti, a major industrial city and home to AvtoVAZ car manufacturer.

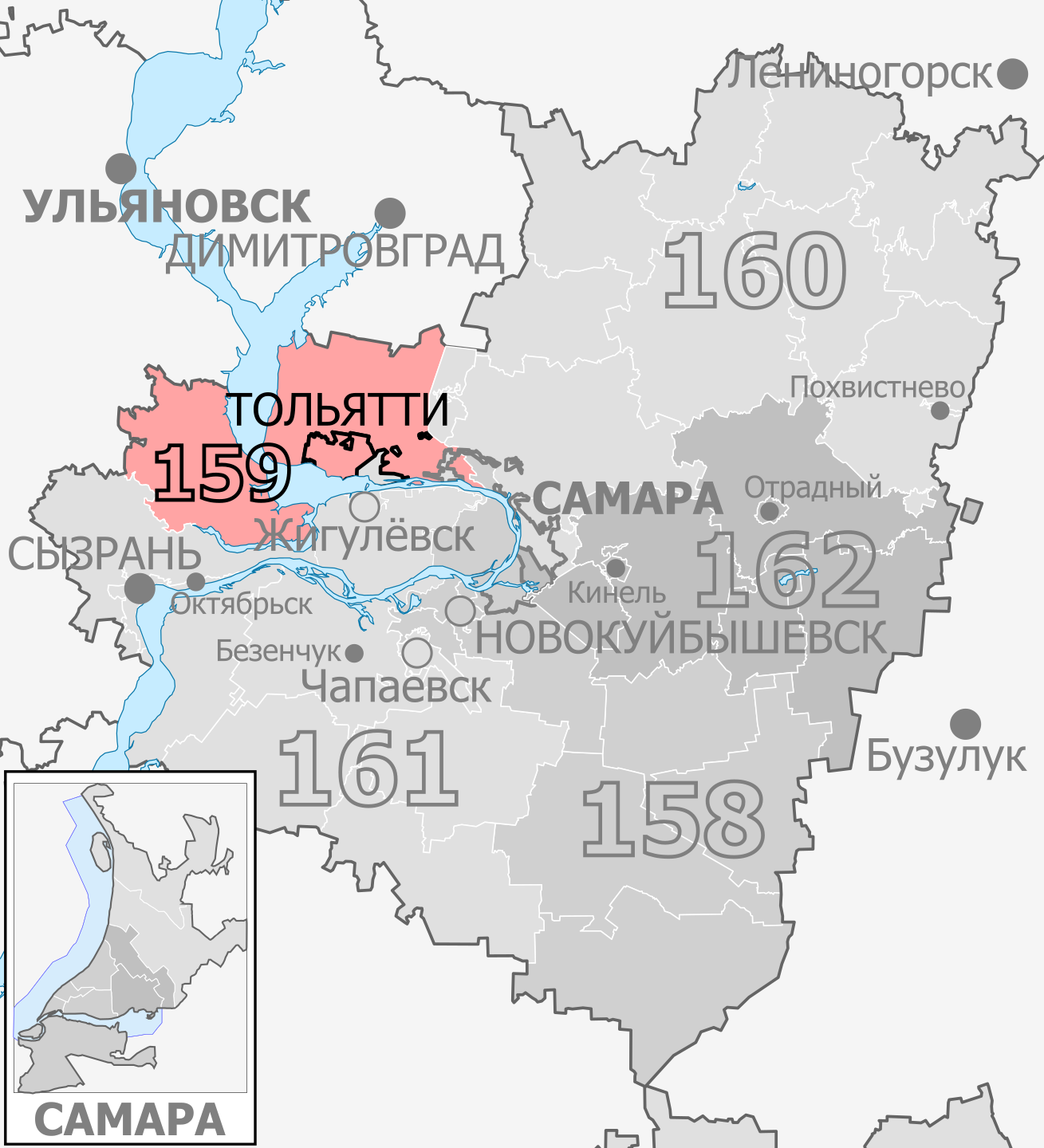
Constituency boundaries from 2016 to 2026

2016–2026: Shigonsky District, Stavropolsky District (Khryashchevka, Kirillovka, Lunacharsky, Musorka, Nizhneye Sancheleyevo, Podstepki, Primorsky, Tashelka, Timofeyevka, Uzyukovo, Verkhneye Sancheleyevo, Verkhniye Belozerki, Vyselki, Yagodnoye), Tolyatti (Avtozavodsky, Tsentralny)
The constituency was re-created for the 2016 election and retained only western and central Tolyatti, losing eastern part of the city to Zhigulyovsk constituency. This seat instead gained the suburbs and exurbs of the city as well as rural Shigonsky District to the west.

2026–present: Stavropolsky District (Kirillovka, Musorka, Nizhneye Sancheleyevo, Novaya Binaradka, Piskaly, Podstepki, Primorsky, Tashelka, Timofeyevka, Uzyukovo, Verkhneye Sancheleyevo, Vyselki), Tolyatti (Avtozavodsky, Tsentralny)
After the 2025 redistricting the constituency shedded some ruralities in Stavropolsky District and the entirety of Shigonsky District to Zhigulyovsk constituency. The constituency also gained territory in western Stavropolsky District from the neighbouring Krasnoglinsky constituency.

== Members ==
Election	Member	Party
1993	Vyacheslav Smirnov	Russian Democratic Reform Movement
1995	Anatoly Morozov	Our Home – Russia
1995	Anatoly Ivanov	Independent
2003	Anatoly Ivanov	People's Party
2007	Proportional representation - no election by constituency	
2011	Proportional representation - no election by constituency	
2016	Vladimir Bokk	United Russia
2021	Leonid Kalashnikov	Communist Party
2026	Leonid Kalashnikov	Communist Party

== Election results ==
=== 1993 ===
Summary of the 12 December 1993 Russian legislative election in the Tolyatti constituency
Candidate	Party	Votes	%
Vyacheslav Smirnov	Russian Democratic Reform Movement	72,388	33.44%
Yulia Danshina	Independent	59,455	27.47%
Vladimir Poplavsky	Independent	26,006	12.01%
Aleksandr Drobotov	Independent	22,431	10.36%
Rakhim Gizatov	Independent	3,765	1.74%
against all		17,209	7.95%
Total		216,455	100%

=== 1995 ===
Summary of the 17 December 1995 Russian legislative election in the Tolyatti constituency
Candidate	Party	Votes	%
Anatoly Morozov	Our Home – Russia	69,451	23.22%
Mikhail Burlakov	Liberal Democratic Party	46,496	15.55%
Yulia Danshina	Stanislav Govorukhin Bloc	34,916	11.68%
Nikolay Sudakov	Agrarian Party	31,140	10.41%
Andrey Polynsky	Independent	29,181	9.76%
Sergey Sedykin	Independent	15,101	5.05%
Vladimir Poplavsky	Derzhava	13,643	4.56%
Vadim Mingalev	Forward, Russia!	12,092	4.04%
Vladimir Lomakin	Congress of Russian Communities	10,821	3.62%
Larisa Bozina	Independent	4,930	1.65%
against all		25,763	8.61%
Total		299,050	100%

=== 1999 ===
Summary of the 19 December 1999 Russian legislative election in the Tolyatti constituency
Candidate	Party	Votes	%
Anatoly Ivanov	Independent	91,011	30.06%
Vitaly Zykov	Independent	37,597	12.42%
Vladimir Chungurov	Communist Party	34,276	11.32%
Vyacheslav Volkov	Independent	30,913	10.21%
Anatoly Morozov (incumbent)	Independent	26,948	8.90%
Dmitry Vasilyev	Unity	21,032	6.95%
Aleksey Kirienko	Fatherland – All Russia	17,592	5.81%
Vladimir Yakushin	Independent	4,587	1.51%
Andrey Zherebyatyev	Party of Pensioners	4,211	1.39%
Vladimir Kozlyayev	Liberal Democratic Party	3,515	1.16%
Vyacheslav Kolesov	Independent	3,216	1.06%
Andrey Demidov	Independent	1,750	0.58%
Sergey Sankov	Congress of Russian Communities-Yury Boldyrev Movement	821	0.27%
Pavel Safronov	Spiritual Heritage	497	0.16%
against all		21,024	6.94%
Total		302,781	100%

=== 2003 ===
Summary of the 7 December 2003 Russian legislative election in the Tolyatti constituency
Candidate	Party	Votes	%
Anatoly Ivanov (incumbent)	People's Party	81,348	29.31%
Aleksandr Taratynov	United Russia	57,947	20.88%
Svetlana Peunova	Independent	30,083	10.84%
Borislav Grinblat	Union of Right Forces	26,419	9.52%
Vladimir Chungurov	Independent	17,933	6.46%
Lyudmila Balashova	Liberal Democratic Party	13,762	4.96%
Igor Safonov	Independent	5,385	1.94%
Boris Zhigalev	Agrarian Party	3,721	1.34%
Vladimir Konovalov	For a Holy Russia	2,014	1.34%
Roman Kolosov	United Russian Party Rus'	1,467	0.53%
against all		33,112	11.93%
Total		278,102	100%

=== 2016 ===
Summary of the 18 September 2016 Russian legislative election in the Tolyatti constituency
Candidate	Party	Votes	%
Vladimir Bokk	United Russia	82,398	34.70%
Leonid Kalashnikov	Communist Party	73,840	31.09%
Sergey Mikhaylov	Liberal Democratic Party	23,307	9.81%
Mikhail Maryakhin	A Just Russia	16,175	6.81%
Anatoly Ivanov	Communists of Russia	9,489	4.00%
Sergey Simak	Yabloko	5,044	2.12%
Andrey Gavrilov	Rodina	4,997	2.10%
Natalya Semikova	The Greens	4,988	2.10%
Mikhail Kurbakov	Party of Growth	3,989	1.68%
Vitaly Yerkayev	People's Freedom Party	3,198	1.35%
Total		246,017	100%

=== 2021 ===
Summary of the 17-19 September 2021 Russian legislative election in the Tolyatti constituency
Candidate	Party	Votes	%
Leonid Kalashnikov	Communist Party	77,988	38.71%
Irina Dolgopolova	United Russia	43,644	21.66%
Ivan Popov	A Just Russia — For Truth	18,924	9.39%
Andrey Urusov	New People	9,565	4.75%
Boris Ardalin	Party of Pensioners	8,066	4.00%
Aleksandr Kotlyar	Liberal Democratic Party	7,322	3.63%
Vadim Nuzhdin	Rodina	6,327	3.14%
Valery Lebedev	Communists of Russia	6,133	3.04%
Nikolay Stepanov	Russian Party of Freedom and Justice	4,918	2.44%
Yevgeny Zverev	The Greens	4,243	2.11%
Oleg Burlak	Party of Growth	4,201	2.09%
Total		198,275	100%

=== 2026 ===
Summary of the 18-20 September 2026 Russian legislative election in the Tolyatti constituency
Candidate	Party	Votes	%
Leonid Kalashnikov (incumbent)	Communist Party	78,212	38.62%
Oleg Sakeyev	United Russia	43,915	21.68%
Vladimir Motryukov	New People	22,130	10.93%
Mikhail Maryakhin	A Just Russia	18,359	9.07%
Aleksandr Naydenov	Liberal Democratic Party	14,527	7.17%
Roman Yershov	Communists of Russia	7,019	3.47%
Svetlana Perfilova	The Greens	5,429	2.68%
Valery Barsuk	Rodina	3,020	1.49%
Total		202,523	100%
