= Bogaty =

Bogaty (Russian: Бога́тый; masculine), Bogataya (Бога́тая; feminine), or Bogatoye (Бога́тое; neuter) is the name of several rural localities in Russia:

- Bogaty, Belgorod Oblast, a khutor in Novooskolsky District of Belgorod Oblast
- Bogaty, Stavropol Krai, a khutor in Kazinsky Selsoviet of Shpakovsky District of Stavropol Krai
- Bogaty, Tula Oblast, a settlement in Velyenikolskaya Rural Administration of Chernsky District of Tula Oblast
- Bogatoye, Belgorod Oblast, a selo in Ivnyansky District of Belgorod Oblast
- Bogatoye, Kaliningrad Oblast, a settlement in Krasnotorovsky Rural Okrug of Zelenogradsky District of Kaliningrad Oblast
- Bogatoye, Krasnoyarsk Krai, a village in Bychkovsky Selsoviet of Bolsheuluysky District of Krasnoyarsk Krai
- Bogatoye, Samara Oblast, a selo in Bogatovsky District of Samara Oblast
- Bogatoye, Saratov Oblast, a selo in Volsky District of Saratov Oblast
