= Avtozavodsky City District, Tolyatti =

Avtozavodsky City District Автозаводский район (Russian)
- District
- Coat of arms

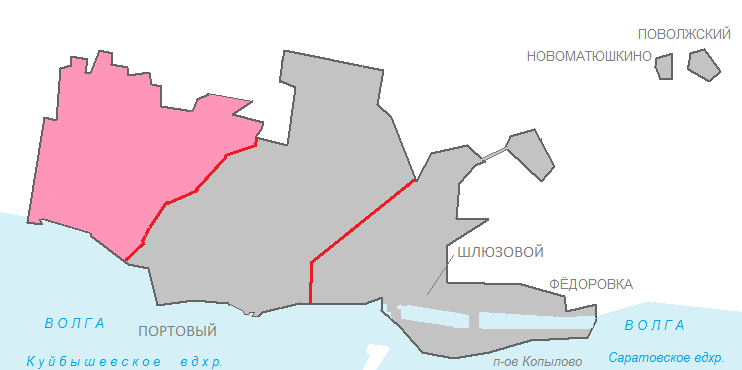
- Location of Avtozavodsky City District on the map of Tolyatti
- Coordinates: 53°31′45.98″N 49°18′14.00″E
- Country: Russia
- Federal subject: Samara Oblast
- Established: 1972
- Administrative center: Tolyatti

Area
  - Total: 88.7 km^{2} (34.2 sq mi)

Avtozavodsky City District (Russian: Автозаво́дский райо́н, lit. 'District of the Automobile Plant') is one of the three districts of the city of Tolyatti, Russia. Population: 442,007 (2010 Census); 429,262 (2002 Census); 369,407 (1989 Soviet census).

== Geography ==
The district is located in the west of the city. It borders the Tsentralny City District of the city in the east, and is surrounded by the Stavropol district of the Samara region from the west and north. In the south, it overlooks the Volga River (the first one downstream).

It is geographically divided into 28 blocks bounded by main highways, and a boulevard usually runs inside each block.
