= Leonid Kalashnikov =

Russian politician (born 1960)

- Леонид Калашников
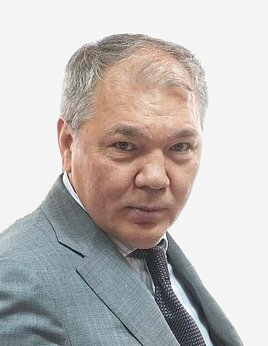

Chairman of the State Duma Committee on Commonwealth of Independent States' Affairs
- Incumbent
- Assumed office 5 October 2016
- Preceded by: Leonid Slutsky

Member of the State Duma
- Incumbent
- Assumed office 24 March 2010
- Preceded by: Julius Kvitsinsky
- Constituency: Samara Oblast; Tolyatti (No. 159)

Personal details
- Born: 6 August 1960 (age 66) Stepnoy Dvorets, Buryat ASSR, RSFSR, USSR
- Party: Communist Party of the Russian Federation
- Education: East Siberian Technological Institute

Leonid Ivanovich Kalashnikov (Russian: Леони́д Ива́нович Кала́шников; born 6 August 1960) is the chairman of the State Duma Russia committee on Commonwealth of Independent States Affairs from 5 October 2016.

He is the Deputy for the Communist Party in the 7th State Duma of the Russian Federation.
