= Andrey Trifonov =

Russian politician

- Андрей Трифонов
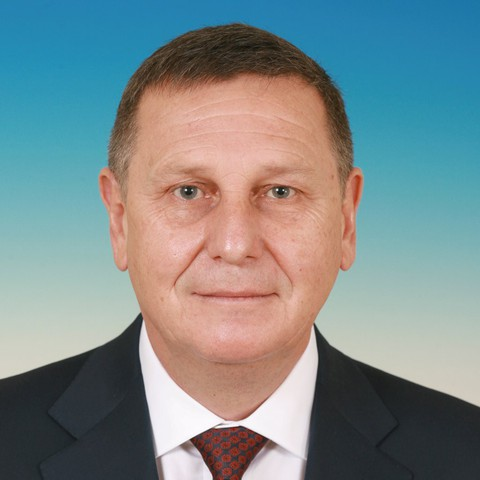
- official portrait, circa 2021

Member of the State Duma for Samara Oblast
- Incumbent
- Assumed office 12 October 2021
- Preceded by: Yevgeny Serper
- Constituency: Zhigulyovsk (No. 161)

Personal details
- Born: 1 May 1965 (age 61) Debaltsevo, Donetsk Oblast, Ukrainian SSR, Soviet Union
- Party: United Russia
- Education: Russian State Agrarian University – Moscow Timiryazev Agricultural Academy

Andrey Fedorovich Trifonov (Russian: Андрей Фёдорович Трифонов; born 1 May 1965) is a Russian political figure and a deputy of the 8th State Duma.

From 1987 to 1992, Trifonov worked as a chief economist of the sovkhoz Yantarny located in the Rostov Oblast. From 1992 to 2000, he was the director of the small state enterprise Contact. In 2005, he was appointed director for special equipment of the machine-building enterprise JSC Tyazhmash (Syzran). From 2007 to 2008, he was the First Deputy General Director of the JSC Tyazhmash. In December 2010, Trifonov became the CEO of the enterprise. Since September 2021, he has served as deputy of the 8th State Duma.
