= Tatishchev Monument (Tolyatti) =

Coordinates: 53°28′26″N 49°20′55″E

The Tatishchev Monument (Russian: Памятник Татищеву) is an equestrian statue on the banks of the Volga at Tolyatti. Completed in 1998, it honors Vasily Tatishchev, the founder of Tolyatti.

== Vasili Tatishchev ==
Vasili Tatishchev (1686–1750) was a prominent Russian statesman, historian, geographer, and economist, and author of History of Russia Since Ancient Times, the first major comprehensive Russian history. He founded the cities of Perm and Yekaterinburg and, in 1737, Stavropol-on-Volga – the city which is now Tolyatti.

== The monument ==
The masonry pedestal uses limestone from the Shiryaevo quarry in Zhigulyovsk. The pedestal is 14 metres (46 ft) high, the statue itself is bronze and is 7.5 metres (25 ft) tall. The statue was cast in Poland and Belarus, with some of the most complex elements being cast in the Czech Republic.

The monument was financed by the Spiritual Heritage fund and donations by organizations, institutions and citizens. The total cost was 14,134,451.75 rubles, with an additional 835,000 spent on improvements to the monument's surroundings.

The architect was A. Kochekovsky, the chief sculptor was People's Artist of Russia Alexander Rukavishnikov, and the project chief engineer was Mikhail Petukhov. The construction was by PSO AO Gidromontazh under the direction of B. Goritsky.

The monument is in the form a miniature fortress of Peter the Great's era - masonry walls with protruding polygonal towers. In the center sits the great statue on the gigantic pedestal. According to Rukavishnikov, during the construction some changes were made in the statue: initially it had been planned that the rider would point to the drowned city of Stavropol-on-Don, but later it was decided that it would be better for him to gesture toward the modern city of Tolyatti.

The monument was officially opened on September 2, 1998 by the then mayor of Tolyatti, Sergei Zhilkin. The opening was attended by Nicholas and Mary Zhestkova, descendants of Vasili Tatishchev.

The monument is located on the shores of the Kuybyshev Reservoir, a location preferred by Rukavishnikov as a better setting than the urban area of Tolyatti. And so Tatishchev is again near the city he founded, which lies now at the bottom of the man-made lake.

Although the monument was created with the people's money, it does not enjoy great popularity among the townspeople. Hooligans hang balloons on the horse periodically, and the pedestal is sometimes marred with graffiti which, from lack of resources, the authorities usually clean only when preparing the monument for some celebration.

But the statue is the image most commonly associated with the city, becoming almost its official symbol, and representations of it can be seen everywhere, from tickets to cognac labels.

== Notes ==
1. The ruble experienced severe volatility during this time (see 1998 Russian financial crisis) so precise exchange rates are difficult to quantify.
