= Bogatoye, Samara Oblast =

Rural locality in Samara Oblast, Russia

Coordinates: 53°03′58″N 51°19′43″E

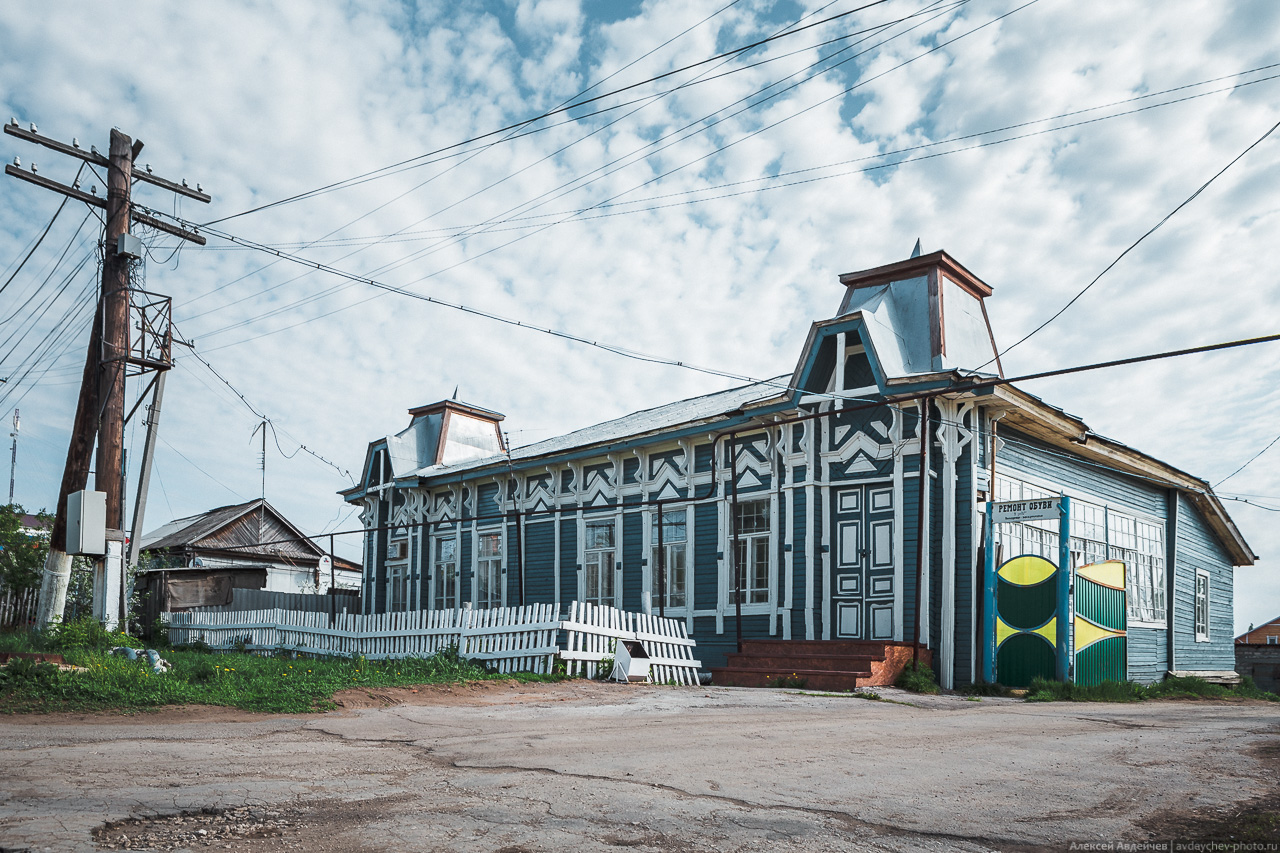
Old post office

Bogatoye (Russian: Богатое) is a rural locality (a selo) and the administrative center of Bogatovsky District, Samara Oblast, Russia. Population: 5,922 (2010 census); 6,441 (2002 census); 6,333 (1989 Soviet census).
