= Komsomolsky City District =

Komsomolsky City District Центральный район
- District
- Coat of arms

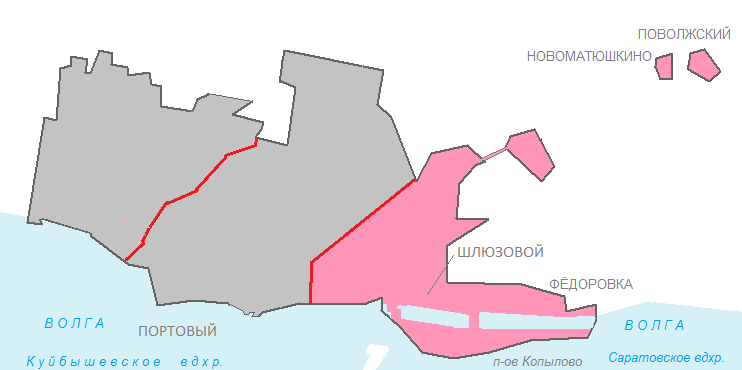
- Location of omsomolsky City District on the map of Tolyatti
- Coordinates: 53°28′54.98″N 49°28′40.01″E
- Country: Russia
- Federal subject: Samara Oblast
- Established: 1972
- Administrative center: Tolyatti

Komsomolsky City District (Russian: Комсомо́льский район) is one of the three districts of the city of Tolyatti, Russia. Population: 157,669 (2010 Census); 160,362 (2002 Census); 163,090 (1989 Soviet census).
