= Oktyabrsk =

Town in Samara Oblast, Russia

Oktyabrsk Октябрьск
- Town
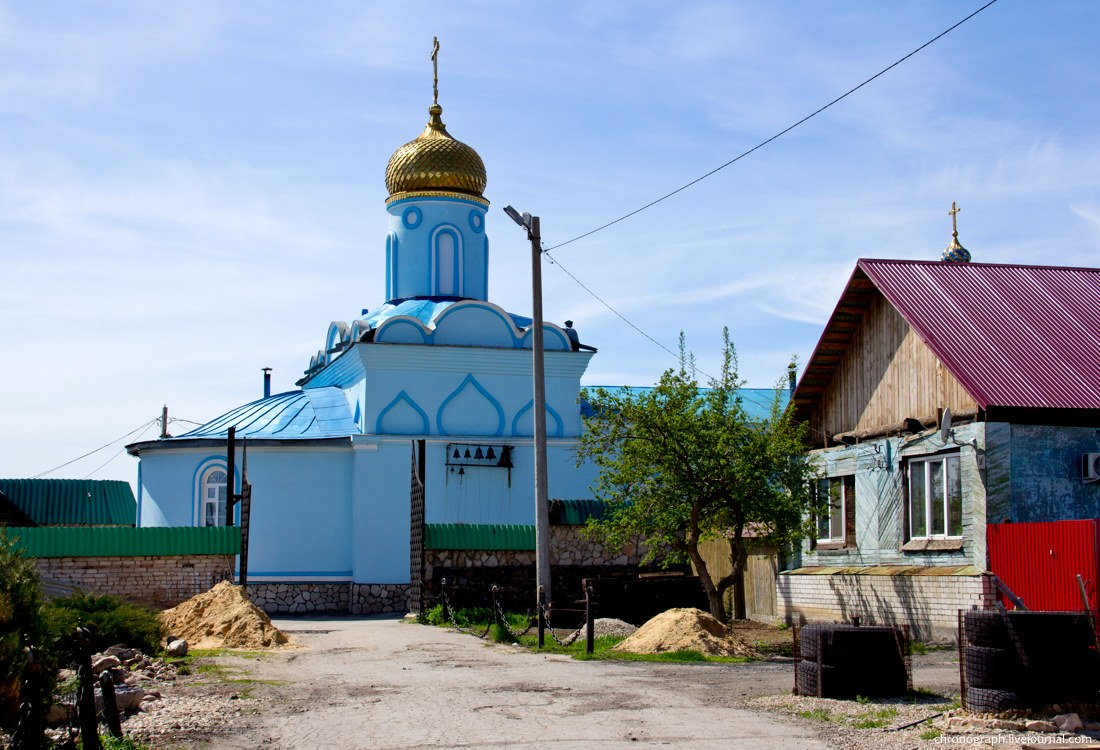

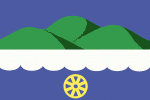
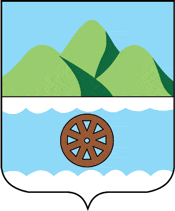
- Flag Coat of arms
- Interactive map of Oktyabrsk
- Location of Oktyabrsk Oktyabrsk (European Russia) Oktyabrsk (Europe)
- Coordinates: 53°10′N 48°40′E
- Country: Russia
- Federal subject: Samara Oblast
- Founded: 1956

Area
  - Total: 21.8 km^{2} (8.4 sq mi)
- Elevation: 50 m (160 ft)

Population (2010 Census)
  - Total: 27,244
  - Estimate (2021): 20,703 (−24%)
  - Density: 1,250/km^{2} (3,240/sq mi)

Administrative status
  - Subordinated to: town of oblast significance of Oktyabrsk
  - Capital of: town of oblast significance of Oktyabrsk

Municipal status
  - Urban okrug: Oktyabrsk Urban Okrug
  - Capital of: Oktyabrsk Urban Okrug
- Time zone: UTC+4 (MSK+1)
- Postal code: 445240
- Dialing code: +7 7 84646
- OKTMO ID: 36718000001
- Website: oktyabrskadm.ru

Oktyabrsk (Russian: Октя́брьск) is a town in Samara Oblast, Russia, located on the right bank of the Volga River (Saratov Reservoir), 154 kilometers (96 mi) from Samara. Population: 27,244 (2010 census); 25,336 (2002 census); 27,449 (1989 Soviet census).

== History ==
It was founded in 1956 by consolidating of three settlements: Batraki, Pravaya Volga and Permomaysky.

== Administrative and municipal status ==
Within the framework of administrative divisions, it is incorporated as the town of oblast significance of Oktyabrsk—an administrative unit with the status equal to that of the districts. As a municipal division, the town of oblast significance of Oktyabrsk is incorporated as Oktyabrsk Urban Okrug.

== Transportation ==
There is a railway station in the town.
