= Pokhvistnevo =

Pokhvistnevo (Russian: Похвистнево) is the name of several inhabited localities in Russia.

Urban localities

- Pokhvistnevo, Samara Oblast, a town in Samara Oblast; administratively incorporated as a town of oblast significance

Rural localities

- Pokhvistnevo, Oryol Oblast, a village in Lomovetsky Selsoviet of Trosnyansky District of Oryol Oblast
- Pokhvistnevo, Penza Oblast, a selo in Studensky Selsoviet of Belinsky District of Penza Oblast
