= Stavropolsky District =

Stavropolsky District Ставропольский район (Russian)
- District
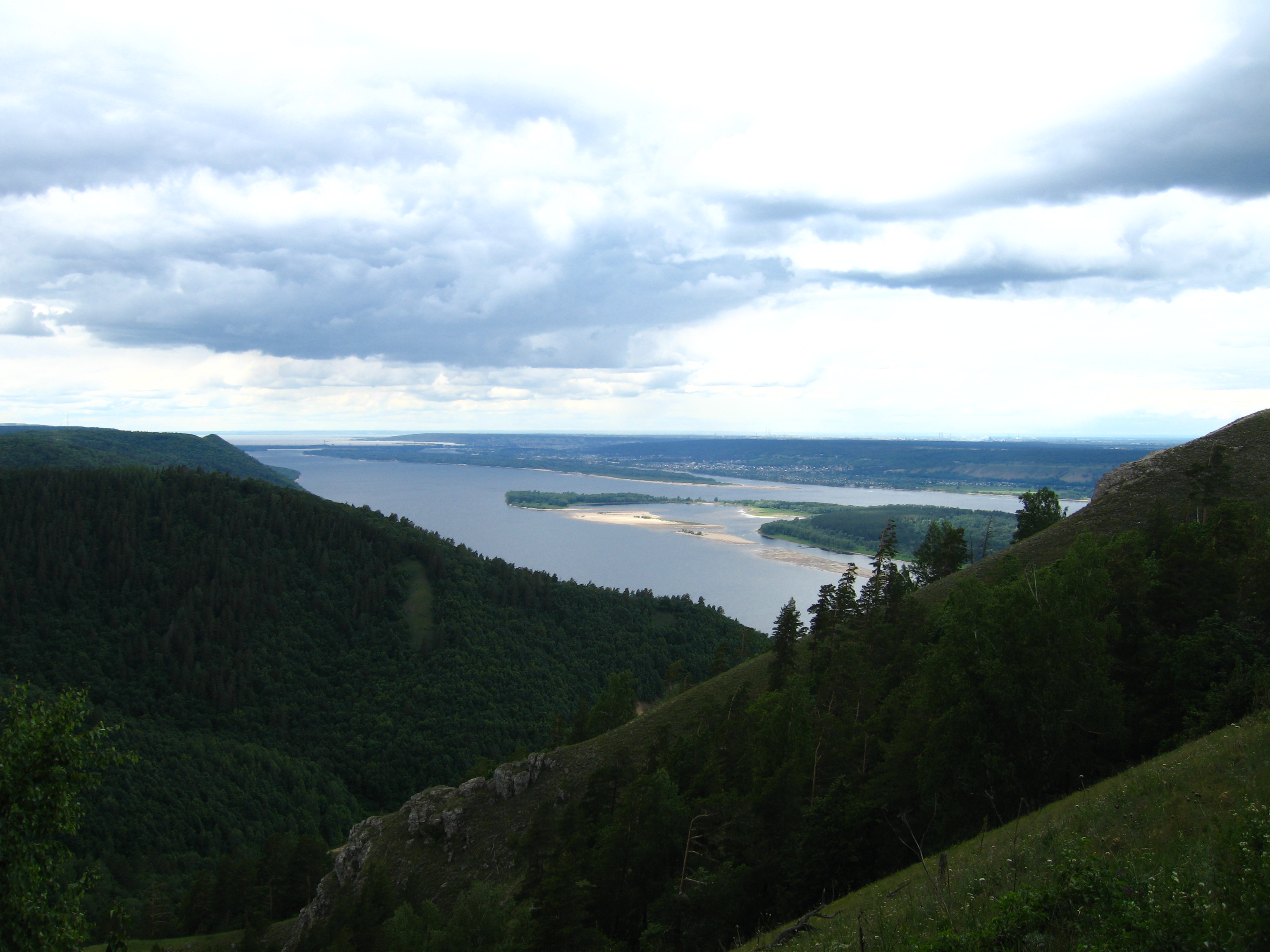
- View from Strelna, Stavropolsky District

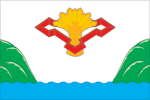
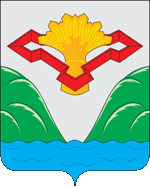
- Flag Coat of arms
- Location of Stavropolsky District in Samara Oblast
- Coordinates: 53°29′N 49°31′E
- Country: Russia
- Federal subject: Samara Oblast
- Established: 16 July 1928
- Administrative center: Tolyatti

Area
  - Total: 3,662 km^{2} (1,414 sq mi)

Population (2010 Census)
  - Total: 54,181
  - Density: 14.80/km^{2} (38.32/sq mi)
  - Urban: 0%
  - Rural: 100%

Administrative structure
  - Inhabited localities: 51 rural localities

Municipal structure
  - Municipally incorporated as: Stavropolsky Municipal District
  - Municipal divisions: 0 urban settlements, 24 rural settlements
- Time zone: UTC+4 (MSK+1)
- OKTMO ID: 36640000
- Website: http://stavr.samgd.ru/

Stavropolsky District (Russian: Ставропо́льский райо́н) is an administrative and municipal district (raion), one of the twenty-seven in Samara Oblast, Russia. It is located in the west of the oblast. The area of the district is 3,662 square kilometers (1,414 sq mi). Its administrative center is the city of Tolyatti (which is not administratively a part of the district). Population: 54,181 (2010 Census); 45,167 (2002 census); 40,347 (1989 Soviet census).

== Administrative and municipal status ==
Within the framework of administrative divisions, Stavropolsky District is one of the twenty-seven in the oblast. The city of Tolyatti serves as its administrative center, despite being incorporated separately as a town of oblast significance—an administrative unit with the status equal to that of the districts.

As a municipal division, the district is incorporated as Stavropolsky Municipal District. The city of oblast significance of Tolyatti is incorporated separately from the district as Tolyatti Urban Okrug.
