= Tsentralny City District, Tolyatti =

Tsentralny City District Центральный район
- District
- Coat of arms

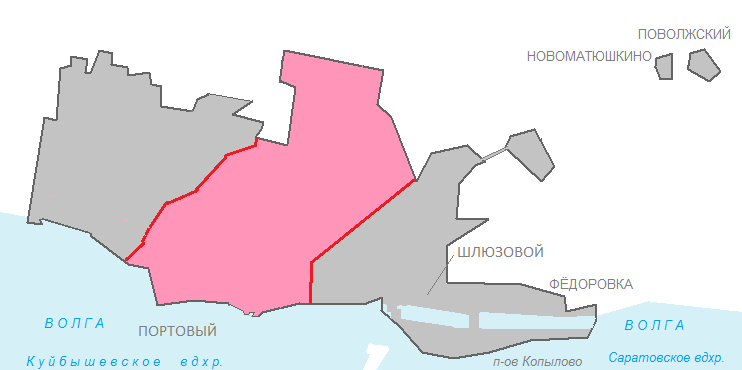
- Location of Tsentralny City District on the map of Tolyatti
- Coordinates: 53°31′0.01″N 49°25′59.99″E
- Country: Russia
- Federal subject: Samara Oblast
- Established: 1972
- Administrative center: Tolyatti

Tsentralny City District (Russian: Центральный район) is one of the three districts of the city of Tolyatti, Russia. Population: 119,956 (2010 Census); 113,295 (2002 Census); 98,046 (1989 Soviet census).
