= Tolyatti =

Tolyatti Тольятти
- City
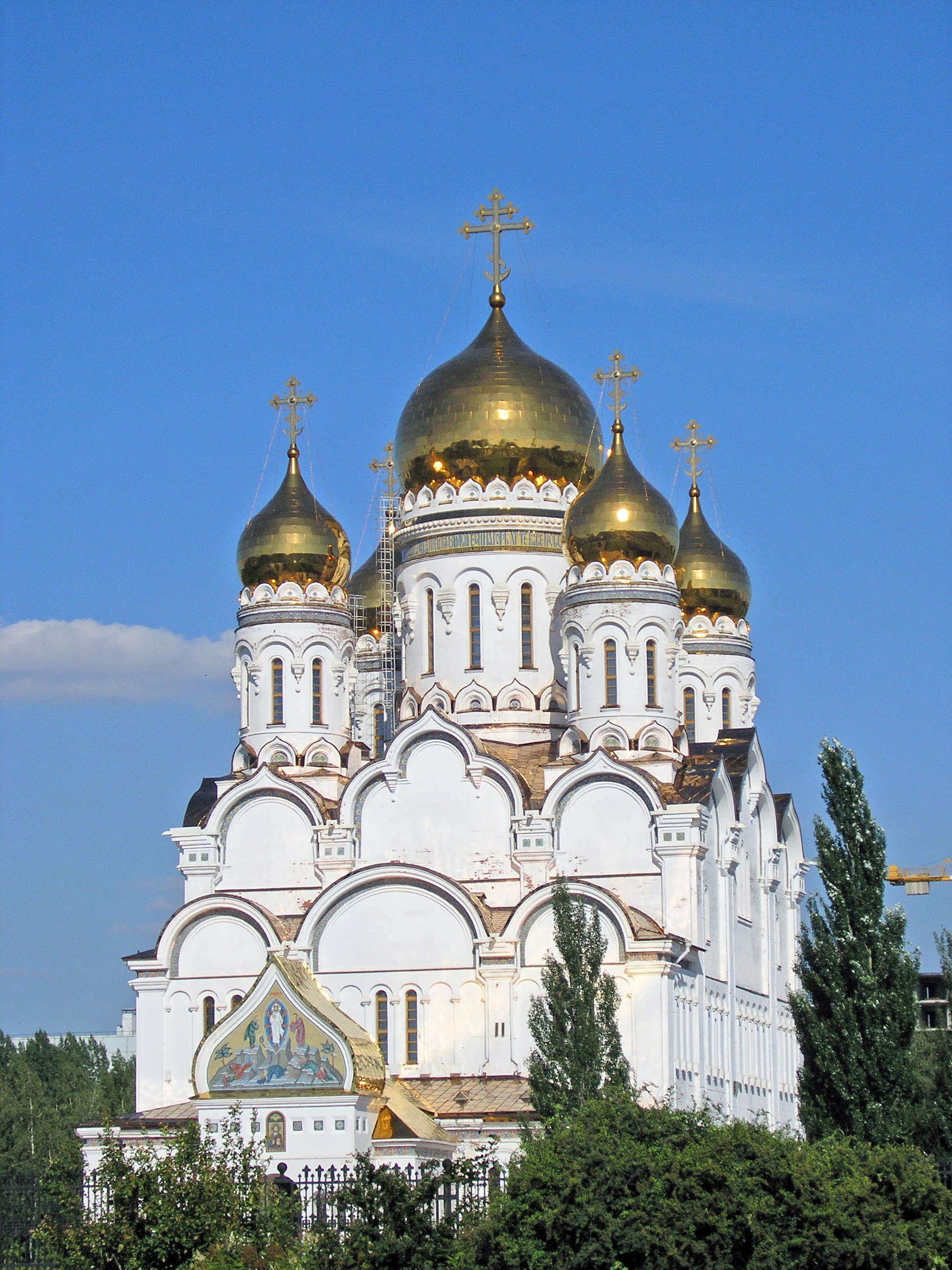
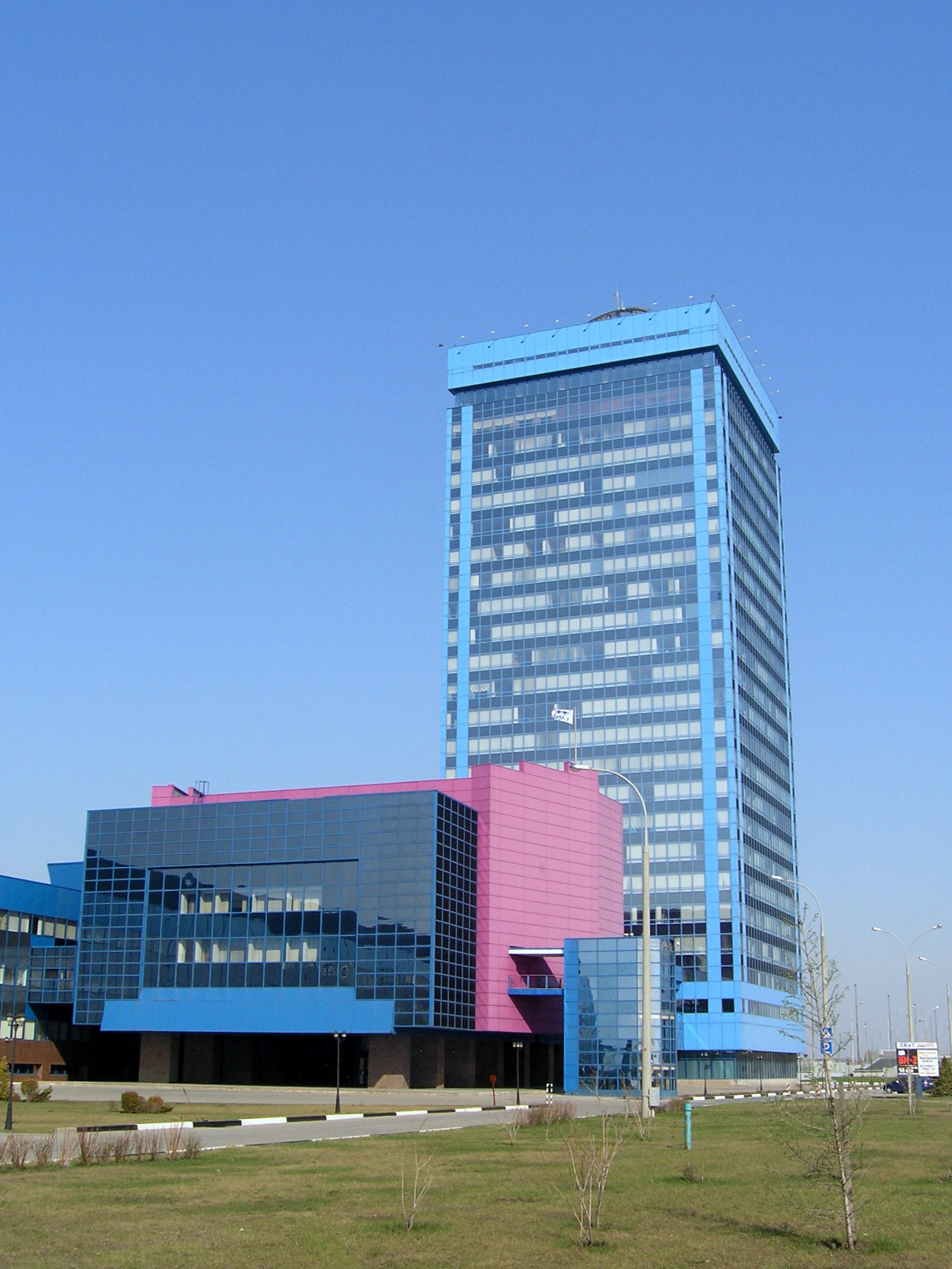
- The Tatishchev Monument Tolyatti Cathedral Mosque Spaso-Preobrazhensky Cathedral The administration building of AvtoVAZ City Hall of Tolyatti

- Flag Coat of arms
- Interactive map of Tolyatti
- Location of Tolyatti Tolyatti (European Russia) Tolyatti (Europe)
- Coordinates: 53°30′32″N 49°25′20″E
- Country: Russia
- Federal subject: Samara Oblast
- Founded: 1737; 289 years ago

Government
  - Body: City Duma
  - Head: Ilya Sukhikh
- Elevation: 90 m (300 ft)

Population
  - Estimate (2025): 662,683 )

Administrative status
  - Subordinated to: city of oblast significance of Tolyatti
  - Capital of: Stavropolsky District, city of oblast significance of Tolyatti

Municipal status
  - Urban okrug: Tolyatti Urban Okrug
  - Capital of: Tolyatti Urban Okrug, Stavropolsky Municipal District
- Time zone: UTC+4 (MSK+1)
- Postal code: 445xxx
- Dialing code: +7 8482
- OKTMO ID: 36740000001
- Website: tgl.ru

Tolyatti or Togliatti, (Note: /tɒlˈjɑːti/ tol-YAH-tee, US also /toʊlˈ-/ tohl-, UK also /ˌtɒliˈæti/ TOL-ee-AT-ee; Russian: Тольятти, IPA: [tɐlʲˈjætʲ(ː)ɪ].) known before 1964 as Stavropol, (Note: Russian: Ста́врополь, IPA: [ˈstavrəpəlʲ]. Also referred to as Stavropol-on-Volga (Ста́врополь-на-Во́лге, Stávropol-na-Vólge) or Stavropol-Volzhsky (Ста́врополь-Во́лжский) to distinguish it from Stavropol-Kavkazsky.) is the second-largest city in Samara Oblast, Russia, after the administrative center, Samara. It is the largest city in Russia which is neither the administrative center of a federal subject, nor the largest city of a subject.

Historical population
Year	Pop.	±%
1897	5,969	—
1926	6,473	+8.4%
1939	9,345	+44.4%
1959	61,281	+555.8%
1970	250,853	+309.3%
1979	502,036	+100.1%
1989	630,543	+25.6%
2002	702,879	+11.5%
2010	719,632	+2.4%
2021	684,709	−4.9%
Source: Census data

The city is best known as the home of Russia's largest car manufacturer AvtoVAZ (Lada). For this reason, Tolyatti is often dubbed "Russia's motor city" or "Russia's Motown" (in reference to Detroit in the United States—the spiritual home of the American automotive industry). It was renamed after Italian communist politician Palmiro Togliatti in 1964, upon his death in the Soviet Union.

== History ==
Stavropol was founded as a fortress in 1737 by the Russian statesman Vasily Tatishchev, partially to house ethnic Kalmyks, who had converted to Russian Orthodoxy. It was often informally referred to as Stavropol-on-Volga to distinguish it from Stavropol, a larger city in southwest Russia, although Stavropol-on-Volga was never its official name.

The construction of the Kuybyshev Dam and Hydroelectric Station on the Volga River in the 1950s created the Kuybyshev Reservoir, which flooded the existing location of the city, and it was completely rebuilt on a new site.

In 1964, the city was chosen as the location of the new VAZ (now AvtoVAZ) automobile plant: a joint venture between Fiat and the Soviet government. It was then renamed Tolyatti after Palmiro Togliatti, the longest-serving secretary of the Italian Communist Party, who had been instrumental in setting up the venture with Fiat and had died in August of that year in Yalta. Much of the modern city was constructed in the 1960s to house the workers of the factory, and as of 2023 AvtoVAZ dominates the economy of the city.

In July and September of 2010, severe forest fires destroyed more than 2,000 hectares of urban forest in Tolyatti (20-25%), causing significant environmental damage. According to the official account, the fires were triggered by extreme heat and drought; strong winds caused power lines to snap, which ignited the blazes.In the years that followed, large-scale reforestation efforts were launched in the city: volunteers, business representatives, and municipal services planted pine saplings and carried out regular maintenance to restore the affected areas. In 2018–2019, pedestrian and bicycle paths were constructed through this zone.

== Administrative and municipal status ==
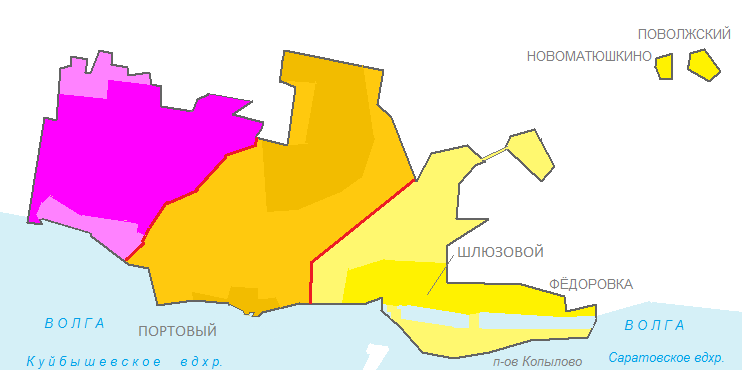
City divisions Avtozavodsky City District Tsentralny (Central) City District Komsomolsky City District

Within the framework of administrative divisions, Tolyatti serves as the administrative center of Stavropolsky District, even though it is not a part of it. As an administrative division, it is incorporated separately as the city of oblast significance of Tolyatti—an administrative unit with the status equal to that of the districts. As a municipal division, the city of oblast significance of Tolyatti is incorporated as Tolyatti Urban Okrug.

=== City divisions ===
For the administrative purposes, the city is divided into three districts:

- Avtozavodsky (Автозаво́дский), also called Novy Gorod (literally New City), is the most modern; it was designed to host the workers of the city's AvtoVAZ factory, home of the Lada car;
- Tsentralny (Центра́льный), also called Stary Gorod (lit. Old City), home of the city government and industrial center;
- Komsomolsky (Комсомо́льский), the oldest district, built to house Hydroelectrical Plant builders.

== Economy ==
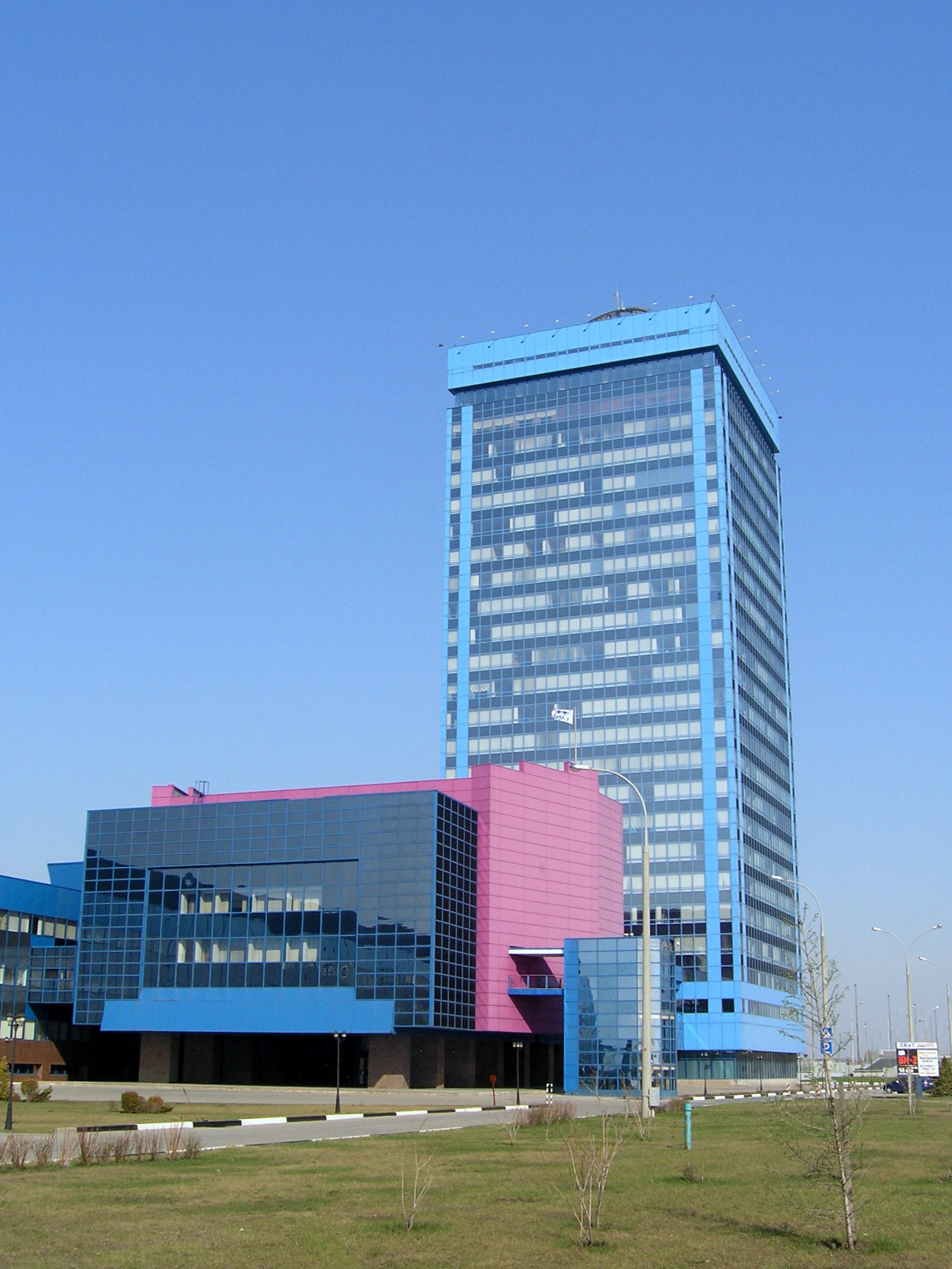
AvtoVAZ administration building

The city's main claim to fame has been automobiles Lada (Zhiguli) manufactured by AvtoVAZ car plant employing some 110,000 people: in cooperation with Italy's Fiat since 1970, with General Motors since 2001 and with the Renault-Nissan Alliance since 2012, and once again becoming an independent, state-owned enterprise in 2022.

Other industries have moved into Tolyatti because it is close to abundant supplies of electricity and water. Petrochemicals are well represented in the city. Among the significant enterprises based there are "TogliattiAzot" (Russia's biggest ammonia manufacturer headed by Sergei Makhlai) and "KuibyshevAzot" (a nitrogen fertilizer manufacturer and Russia's biggest caprolactam and polyamide producer). Other industries include building materials production, ship repair and electrical equipment and electronics.

In 2011 the Tolyatti Special Economic Zone was launched in order to develop the region further and diversify the economy of the city. Several auto-component producers (German Mubea and Japanese Sanoh among them) have since been registered, as well as large industrial manufacturers (Praxair and Edscha). By November 2012 the value of project investment totalled 10 billion Rubles and around 3000 jobs were being created.

=== Transportation ===
The transport system is well developed in the city. Public transport includes municipal buses and trolley-buses, and so-called "alternative" (commercial) transport or marshrutkas.

External transport routes are provided by two bus stations, two railway stations and a city harbour. Tolyatti has its airport as well, but it is used by personal aircraft only (the nearest international airport, Kurumoch, is located 40 km away, towards Samara). The city is linked to the federal road network by the M5 "Ural" highway.

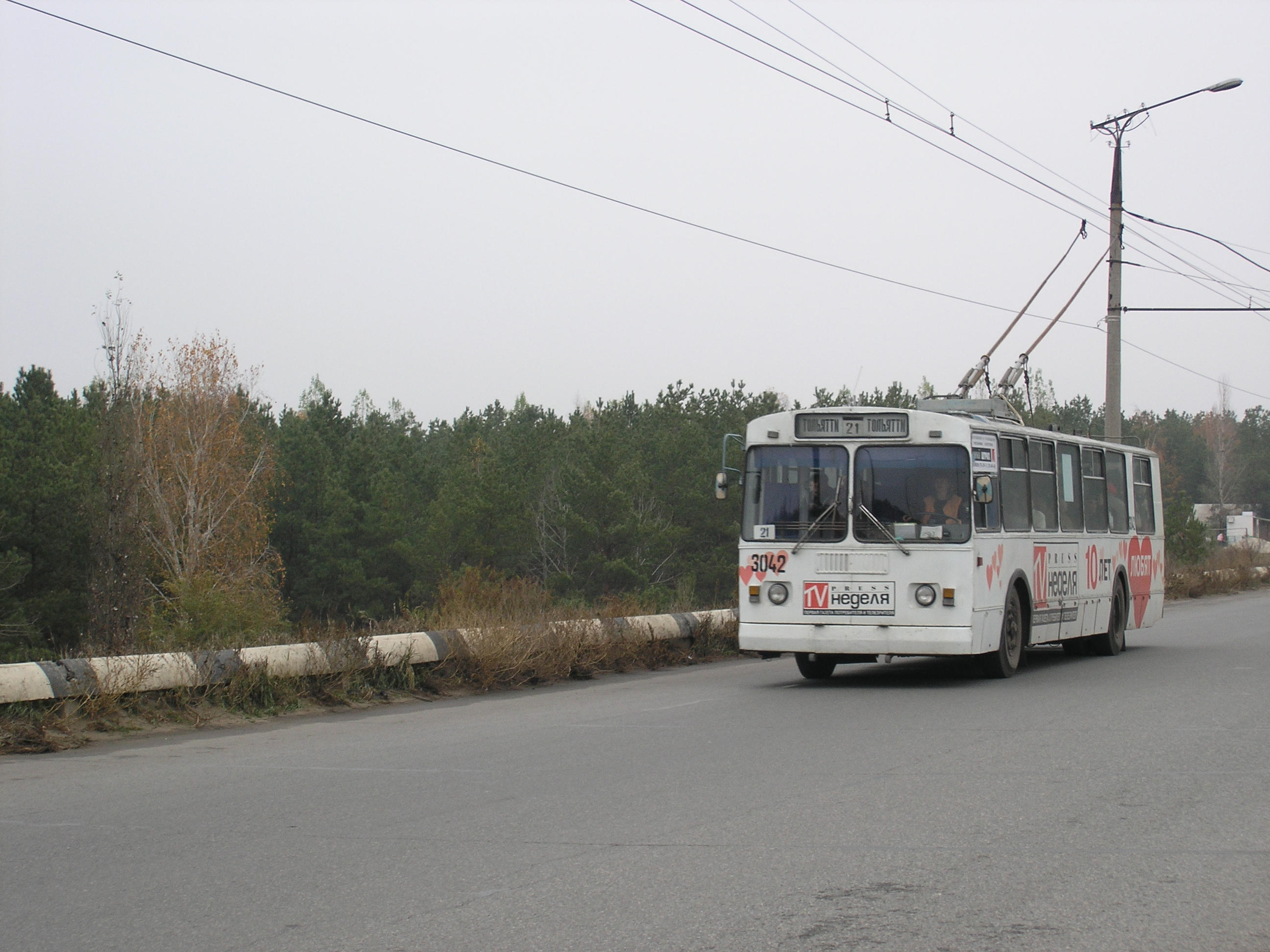
A ZIU-9 Trolleybus

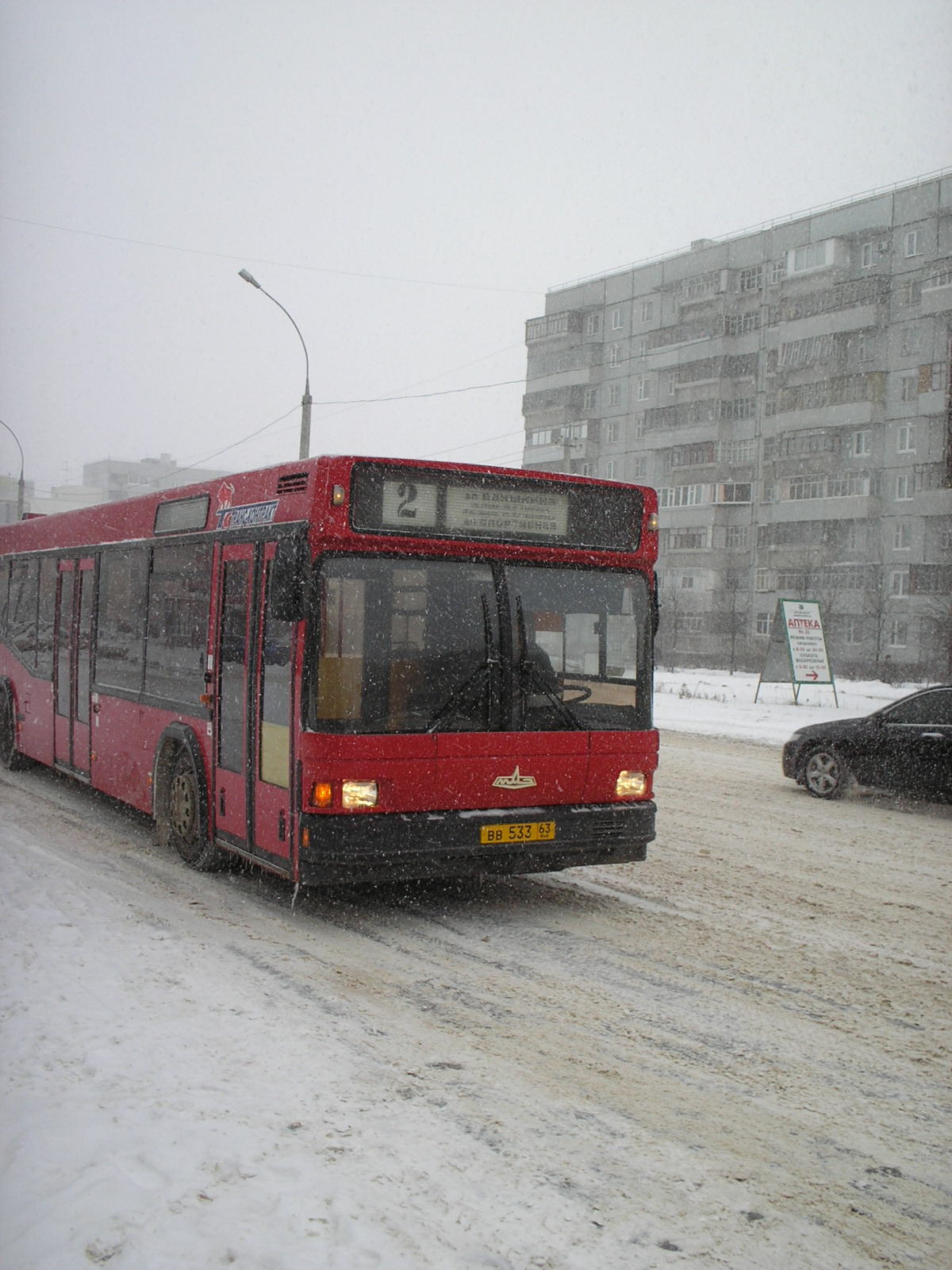
MAZ-103 bus

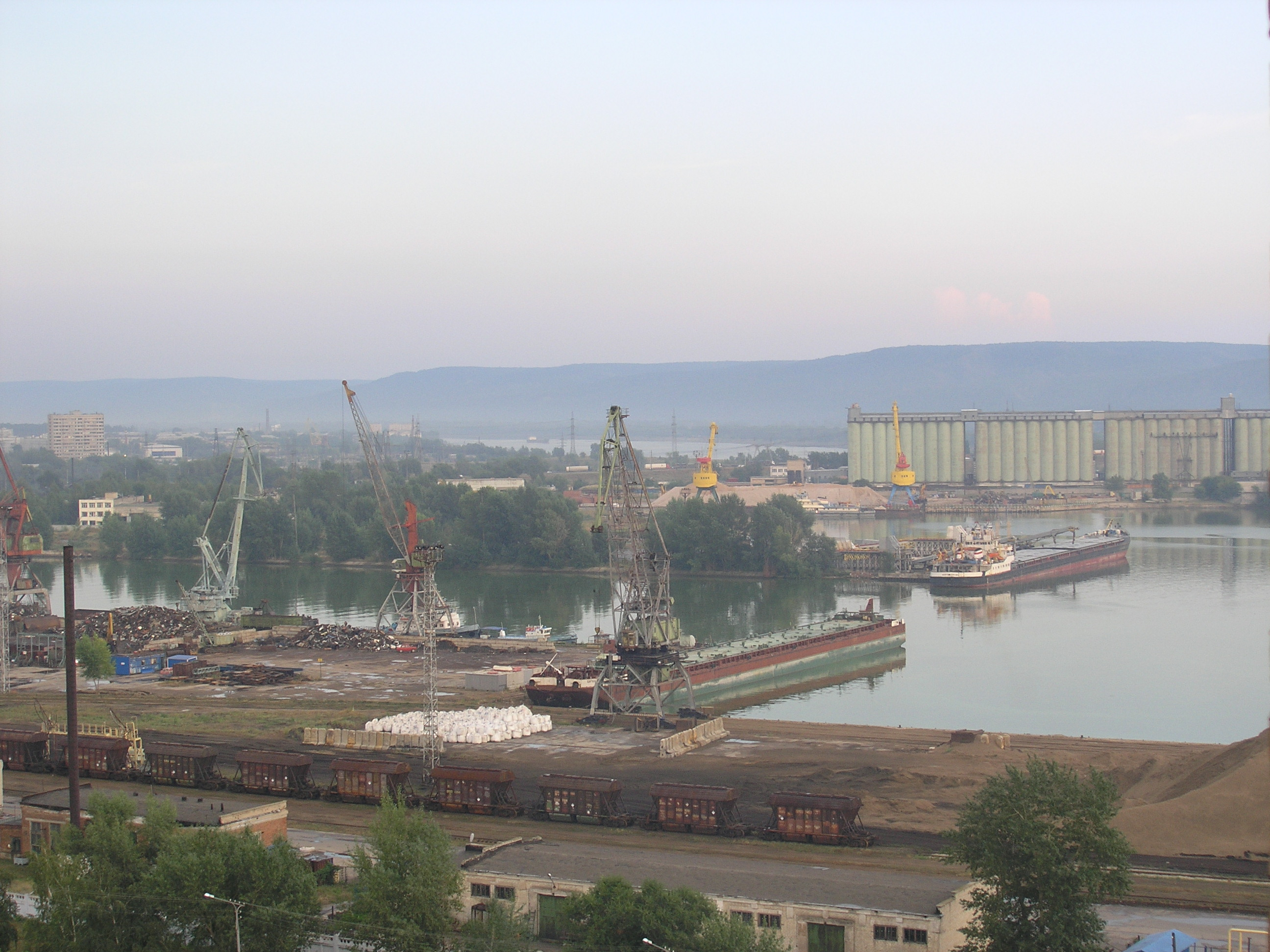
River port on the Volga

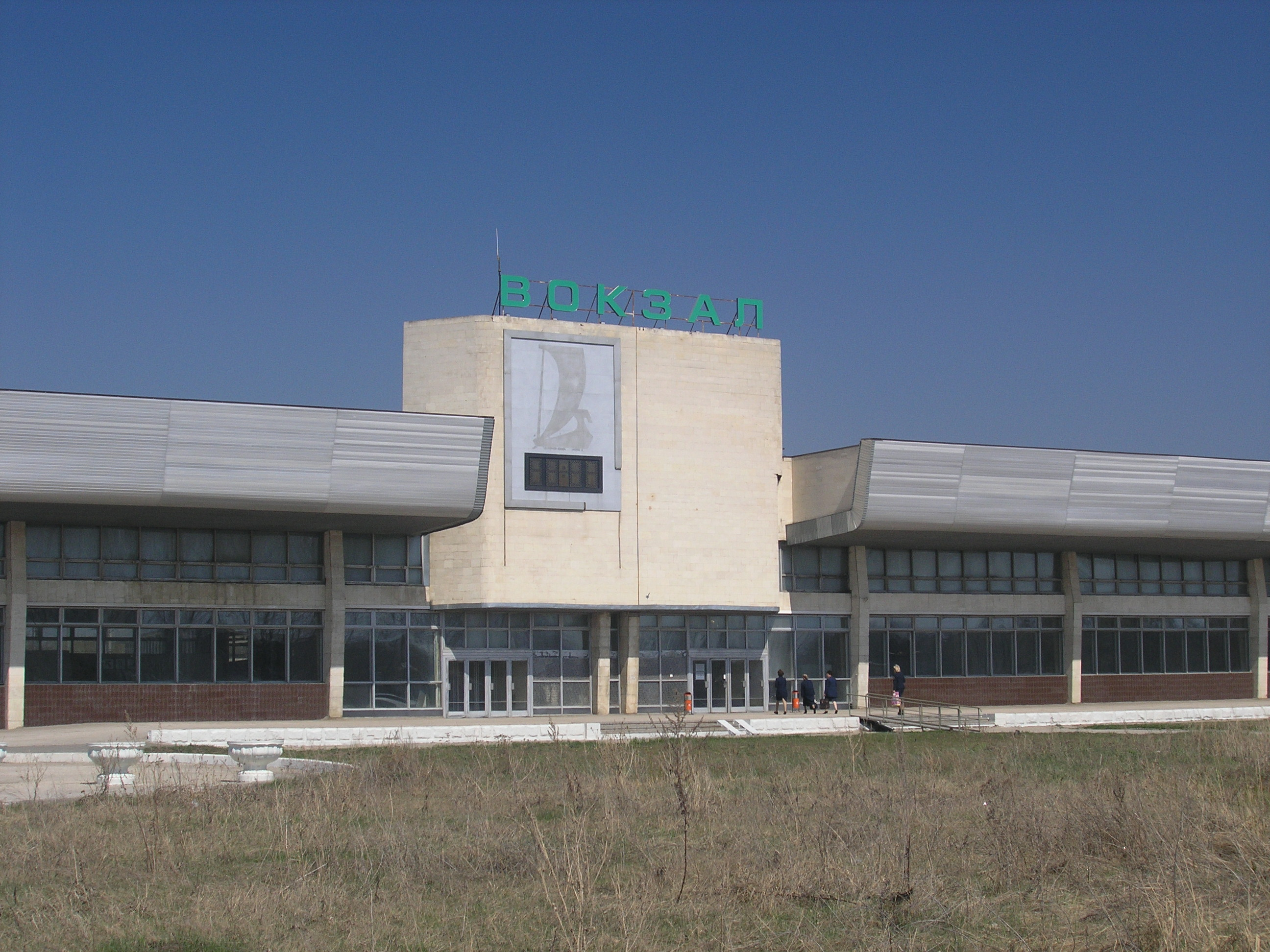
Tolyatti Railway station

== Culture, education, and sports ==
The creation of the Kuybyshev Reservoir in the 1950s destroyed much of the city's history, so almost all the city's cultural points of interest date from the Soviet period, but the city administration has continued to build new monuments and cathedrals. A recent notable event was the 1998 opening of the large Tatishchev Monument near the Volga. The Transfiguration Cathedral was completed in 2002.

=== Education ===
Education is represented by over one hundred public and ten private schools, as well as several higher education institutions. Most notable ones include:

- Togliatti State University (Тольяттинский государственный университет, ТГУ)
- Volga Region State University of Service (Поволжский государственный университет сервиса, ПВГУС)
- Tatishchev University of Volga (Волжский университет имени В. Н. Татищева, ВУиТ)
- Togliatti Academy of Management (Тольяттинская академия управления, ТАУ)

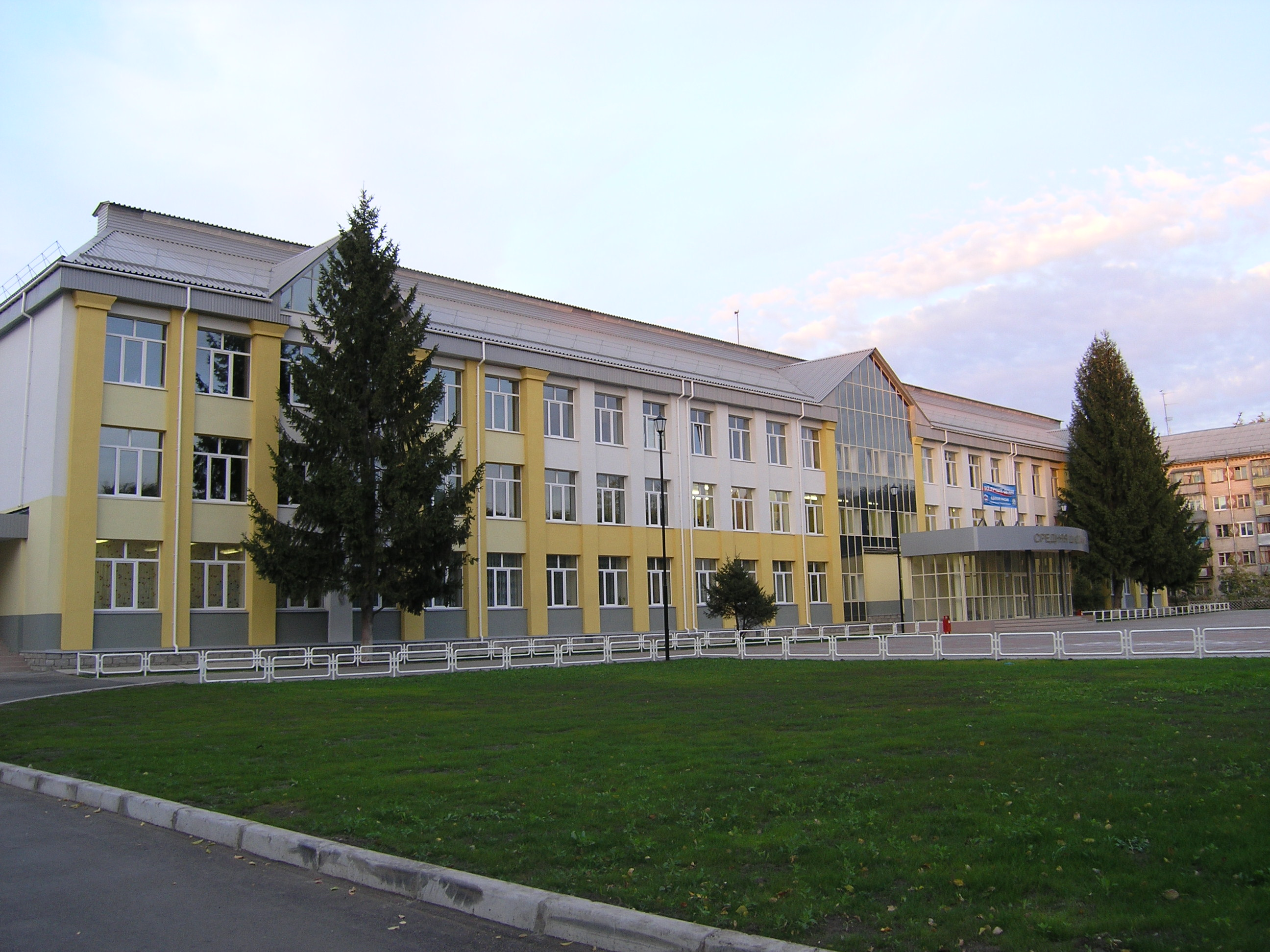
School number 13

=== Museums ===
- AvtoVAZ Technical Museum
- Tolyatti museum of local lore

=== Sports ===
In the eyes of the Soviet leaders, Tolyatti was a perfect Soviet city (since most population migrated here during the construction of AvtoVAZ factories) – many sports facilities appeared so that the "perfect Soviet person" could be healthy. The city has high-quality sports facilities: gymnasiums, swimming pools, ice arenas, association football and racing stadiums — as a result, many athletes, including Olympic Champion Alexei Nemov, Stanley Cup winners Alexei Kovalev and Ilya Bryzgalov had moved to Tolyatti. Former Montreal Canadiens defenseman Alexei Emelin, and former Washington Capitals winger Viktor Kozlov and defenseman Alexei Tezikov were born there. Daria Kasatkina, a professional tennis player, was born there.

Tolyatti is represented in almost every kind of team sports. Tolyatti's Lada-sponsored Ice Hockey Club broke the Moscow teams' domination of the game. The Lada women's football team has won the Russian championship several times — and the Lada women's handball team, who are the Russian and European Champions, is the core for Russian national women's handball. Men's football (FC Lada Togliatti), basketball and handball teams also take part in national championships. As for the traditional national sport of Russia, bandy, there is a team founded in 2013, TOAZ, which however only takes part in a recreational league.

Mega-Lada Togliatti who race at the Anatoly Stepanov Stadium are a record 17-times champions of Russia.

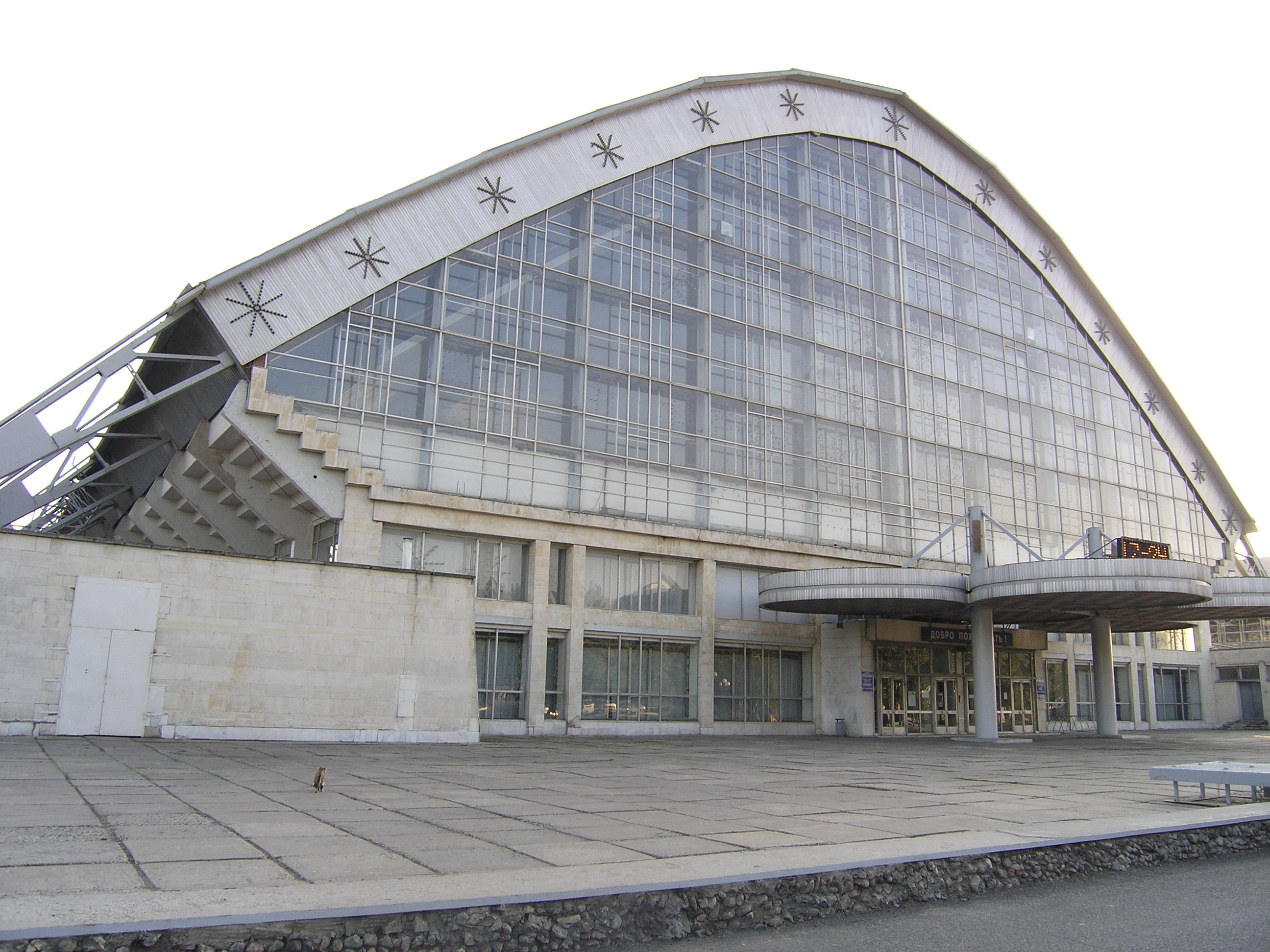
Olimp Sport Palace

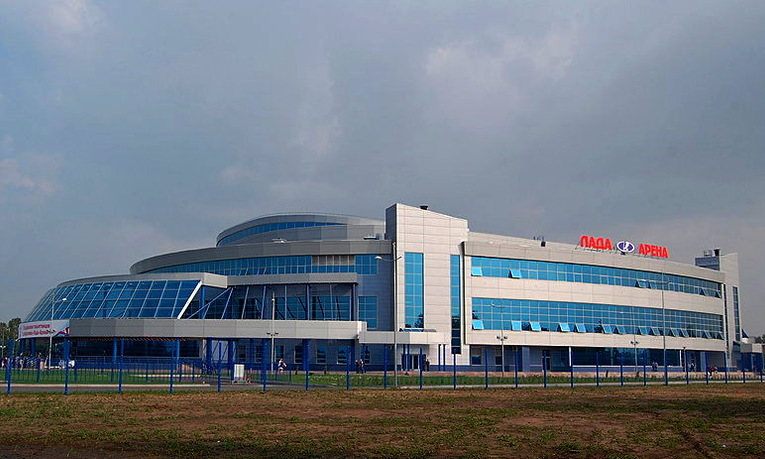
Lada Arena, home to HC Lada Togliatti

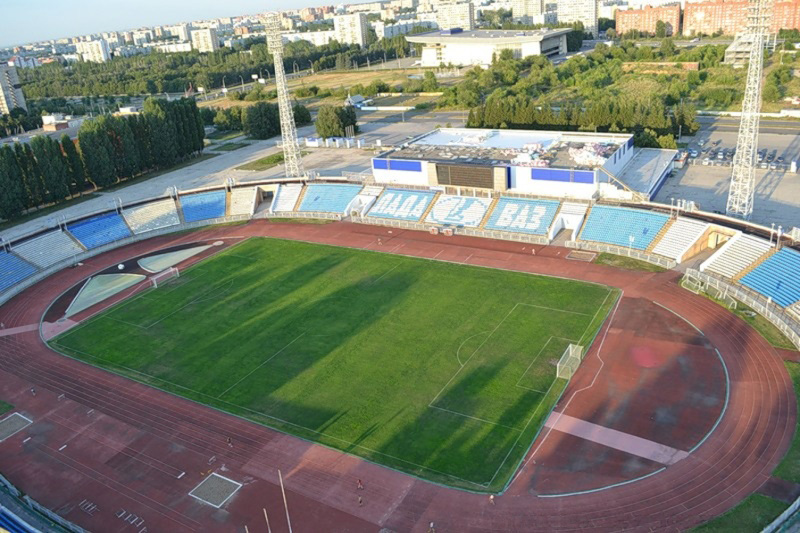
Torpedo Stadium, home to FC Lada Togliatti

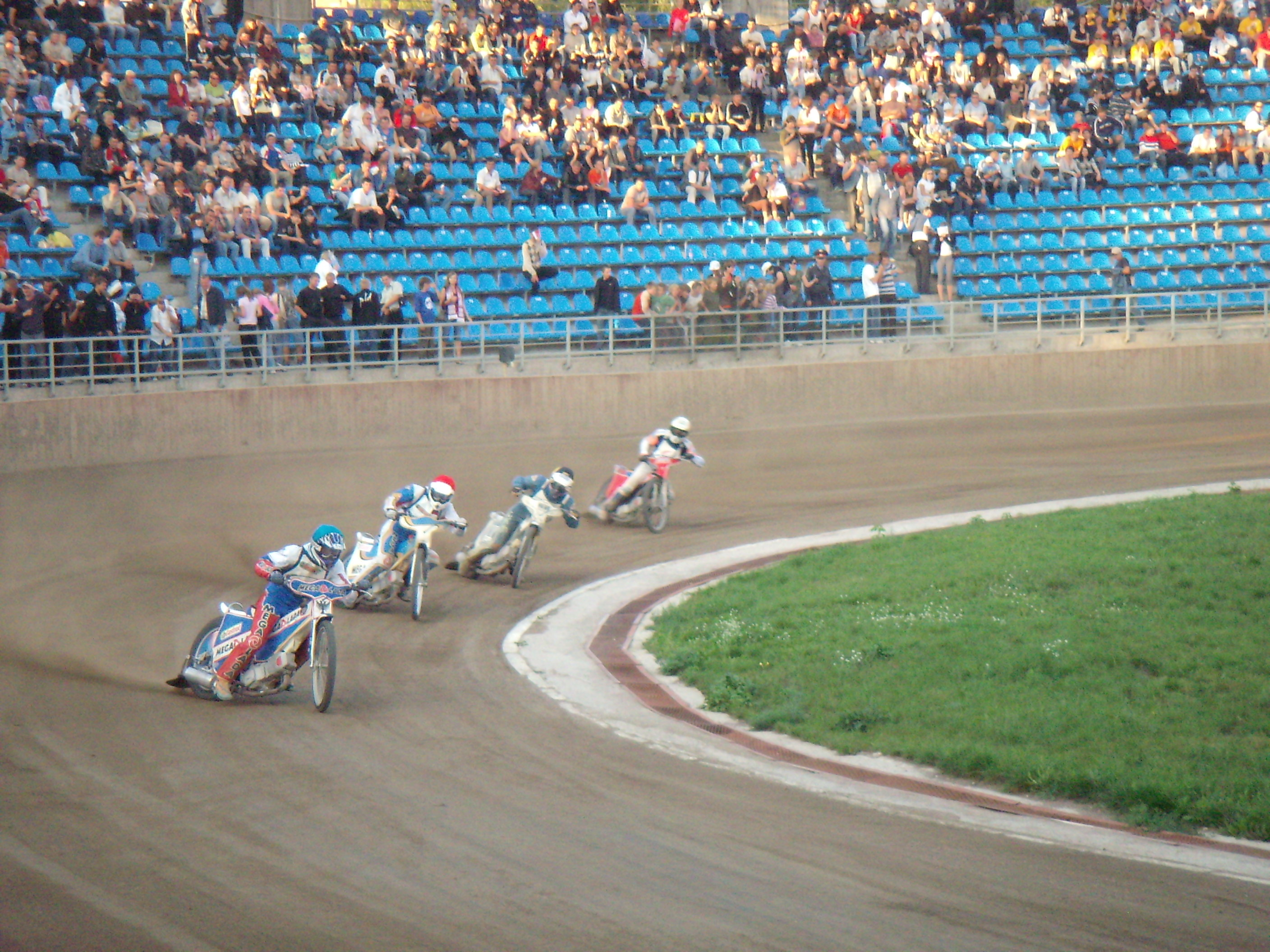
Anatoly Stepanov Stadium, home to Mega-Lada

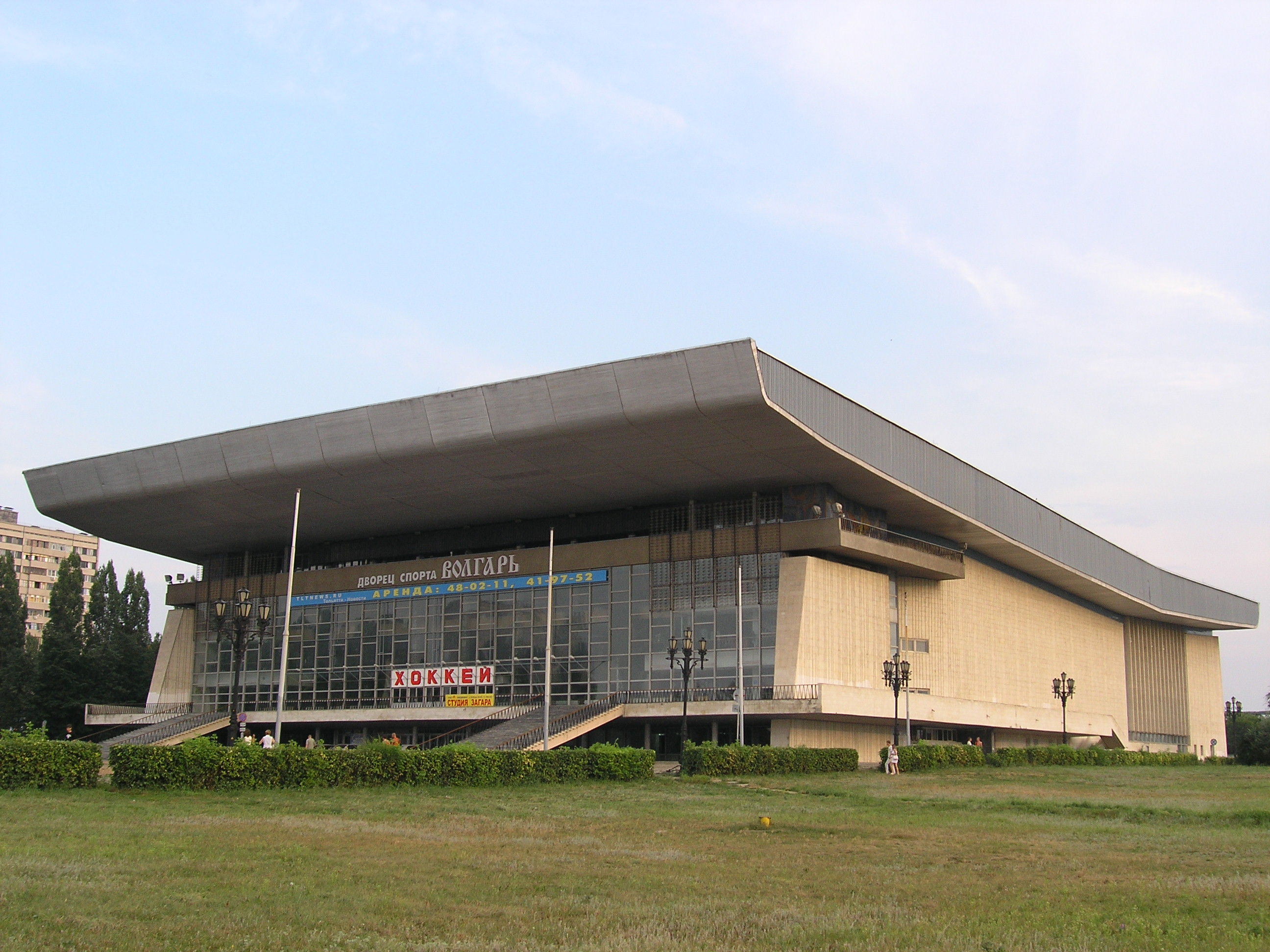
Volgar Sports Palace, former home to HC Lada Togliatti

=== Parks and monuments ===
Tolyatti has many parks, and many of these contain monuments of cultural, historical, and aesthetic interest. Examples include Victory Park with its Victory Monument and other monuments, Liberty Square with its Obelisk of Glory and other monuments, Central Park with its Mourning Angel (a memorial to victims of Soviet repression), large statue of Lenin, and other monuments, and other parks.

And there are other monuments outside the parks. The City Duma has been energetic in creating or designating historical and cultural monuments, ranging from the colossal equestrian Tatishchev Monument to the tumbledown Repin House and a monument to a faithful dog, and many other types.

== Media ==
There are a number of local newspapers published in Tolyatti: Ploshchad Svobody, Tolyattinskoye Obozreniye (Tolyatti Observer), business newspaper "Monday" ("Ponedelnik"), Volny Gorod, Gorodskiye Vedomosti, and a few others. In the end of the 1990s, Tolyattinskoye Obozreniye published a series of articles on a local crime group. The stories drew attention to the group's connections with the local police. Subsequently, Togliatti Review saw two of its editors (Valery Ivanov and Alexei Sidorov) killed in 2002–2003.

The only local-born FM-band radio station is Radio August at 70.64 and 102.3 MHz.

== Religion ==
Tolyatti is a multi-ethnic and multi-religious city. Most religious people in the city are of the Orthodox Christian faith. Muslims are the second largest group of believers. Also in the city are organizations of almost all major religions: Old Believers, Catholics, Jews, Protestants, Buddhists and others.

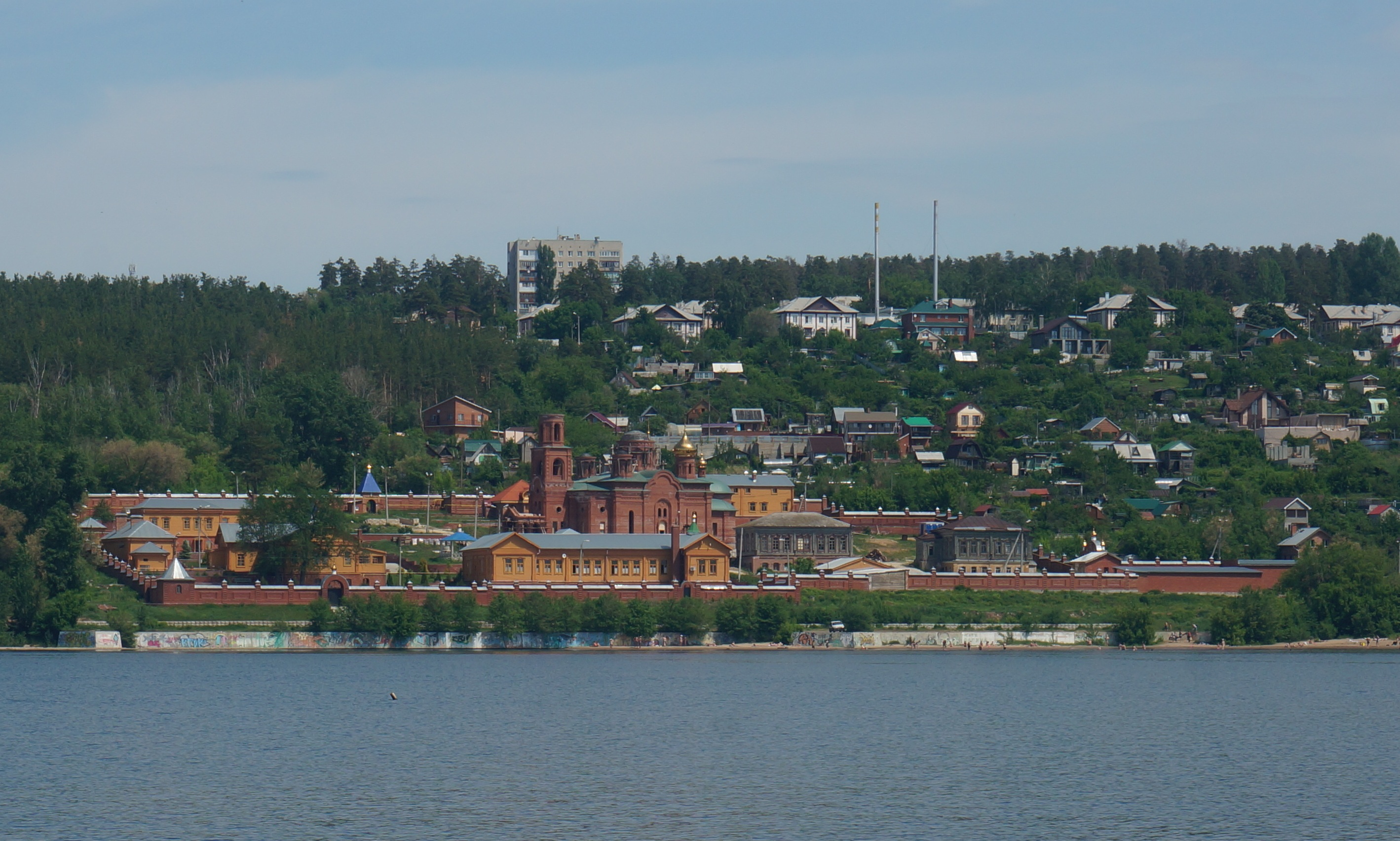
Voskresenskiy (Resurrection) Monastery, the city of Tolyatti

== Crime ==
=== October 2007 bomb attack ===
During the morning rush hour of 31 October 2007, a bomb exploded on a passenger bus in the city, killing at least eight people and injuring about 50 in what Irina Doroshenko, a spokeswoman for the investigative wing of the local prosecutor's office, said could be a terrorist attack. At the beginning of the investigation, it was believed to be the work of terrorists from the North Caucasus. Early reports indicated possible involvement of Chechen terrorist Doku Umarov. However, the officials later named a 21-year-old Evgeny Vakhrushev, who also died in the blast, as the only person to be responsible for the tragedy.

=== Organized crime ===
The city also has a reputation for gang violence.

=== Violent crimes ===
The city has witnessed a mafia killing spree: there have been 550 commissioned killings in Tolyatti over 1998–2004, five of those murdered were journalists.

Three chief architects of Tolyatti were victims of violent crimes: Valery Lopatin was shot to death on July 7, 2004, Mikhail Syardin and Aleksander Kiryakov were also injured in violent attacks.

A former city mayor (1994–2000), Sergey Zhilkin, was murdered on November 15, 2008.

On December 13, 2008, Anatoly Stepanov, a vice-speaker of Duma of Samara Oblast, a former head of administration of Tsentralny City District of Tolyatti in 1991-1997 and Tolyatti mayor candidate in 2004, was attacked on a street and left with serious head injuries. He died in hospital on February 24, 2009.

=== Corruption ===
The city's mayor in 2000–2007, Nikolay Utkin, was sentenced to seven years in prison on corruption charges.

== Local government ==
Mayor Antashev Sergey Alexandrovich was born on December 16, 1959, in the city of Saransk, Mordovia. In 1994 he moved to Tolyatti, was accepted to the post of director of the heating network enterprise of TEVIS. In 2000 he graduated from the International Market Institute with a degree in management. From 2000 to April 9, 2012 - Marketing Director - Energy Sales Director of TEVIS. Deputy of the Duma of the city district of Togliatti IV (from 2005 to 2009) and V (from 2008 to 2012) convocations. From April 2012 to February 2015, he served as deputy mayor of the city of Tolyatti on urban economy. On April 12, 2017, the Tolyatti City Council appointed Sergey Antashev as the mayor of the city.

On March 4, 2021, Igor Ladyka was appointed acting mayor of the Togliatti city district, in connection with the resignation of Sergei Antashev.

On April 30, 2021, Nikolai Rentz took office as head of the Togliatti city district. The inauguration ceremony was attended by the Governor of the Samara Region Dmitry Azarov.

== Twin towns – sister cities ==
Tolyatti is twinned with:

- Flint, United States
- Futian (Shenzhen), China
- Kazanlak, Bulgaria
- Luoyang, China
- Nagykanizsa, Hungary
- Piacenza, Italy
- Wolfsburg, Germany
- Mingachevir, Azerbaijan

=== Partner cities ===
- Le Havre, France
- Novo Mesto, Slovenia

== Notable people ==
- Bo Andersson, (born 1955), CEO of AvtoVAZ
- Varvara Bakhmeteva (1815–1851), Mikhail Lermontov's love interest and muse
- Vasily Banykin (1888–1918), chairman of the executive committee of the city after the October Revolution
- Ilya Bryzgalov (1980) Former NHL goalie who won the Stanley cup in 2007
- Artyom Dubinin (born 1989), professional ice hockey player
- Alexei Emelin (born 1986), professional ice hockey player
- Anastasia Fedko (born 2000), actress
- Denis Gurianov (born 1997), professional ice hockey player
- Daria Kasatkina (born 1997), professional tennis player
- Alexei Kovalev (born 1973), professional ice hockey player
- Viktor Kozlov (born 1975), professional ice hockey player
- Sergei Lysov (born 2004), Israeli wheelchair tennis player
- Alexei Nemov (born 1976), Olympic champion in Artistic gymnastics
- Diana Shnaider (born 2004), professional tennis player
- Valentina Stupina, (1920–1943), pilot
- Fedor Svechkov (born 2003), professional ice hockey player
- Vasily Tatishchev (1686–1750), founder of the city

== Gallery ==
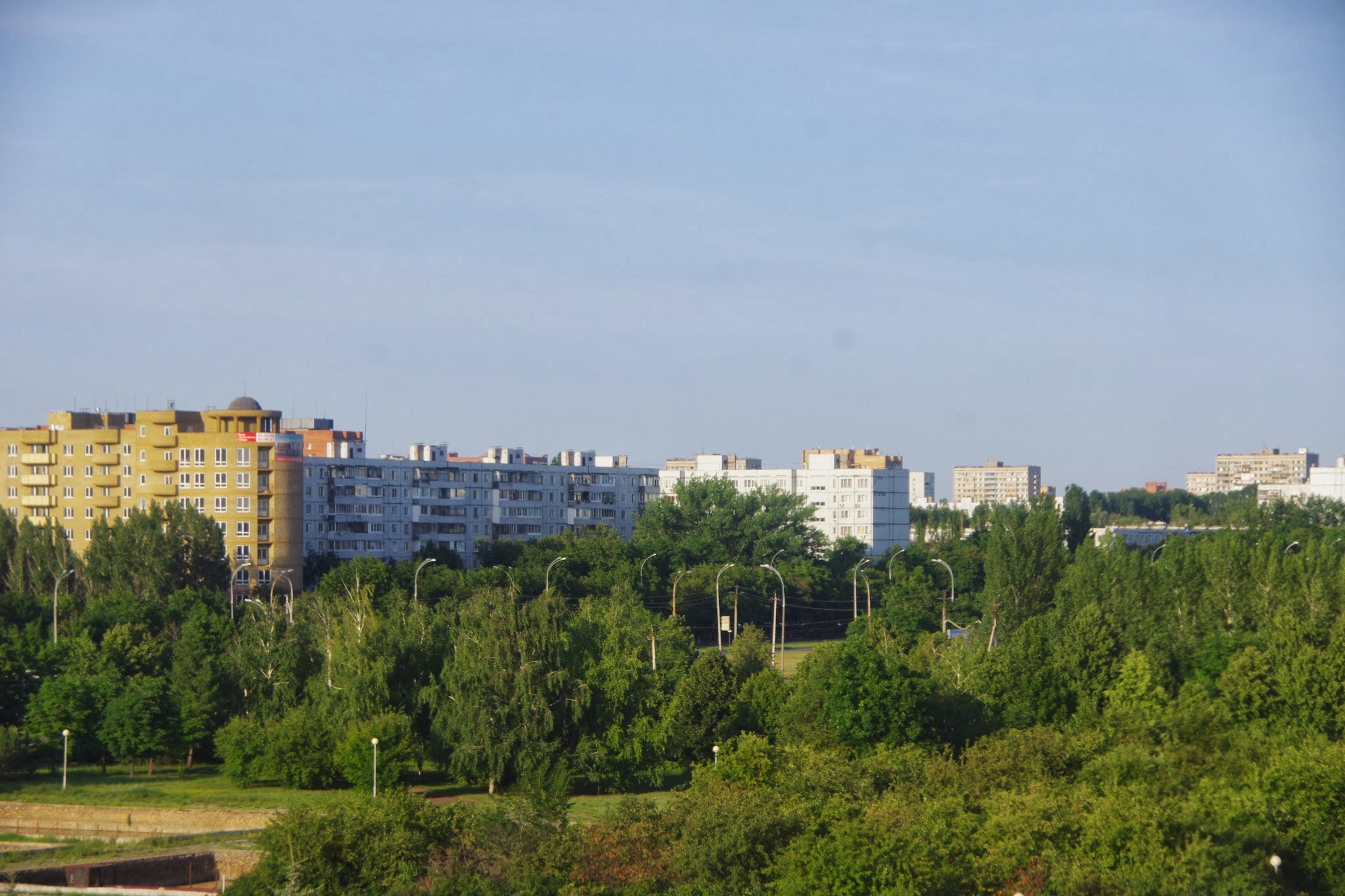
Avtozavodsky district of Tolyatti

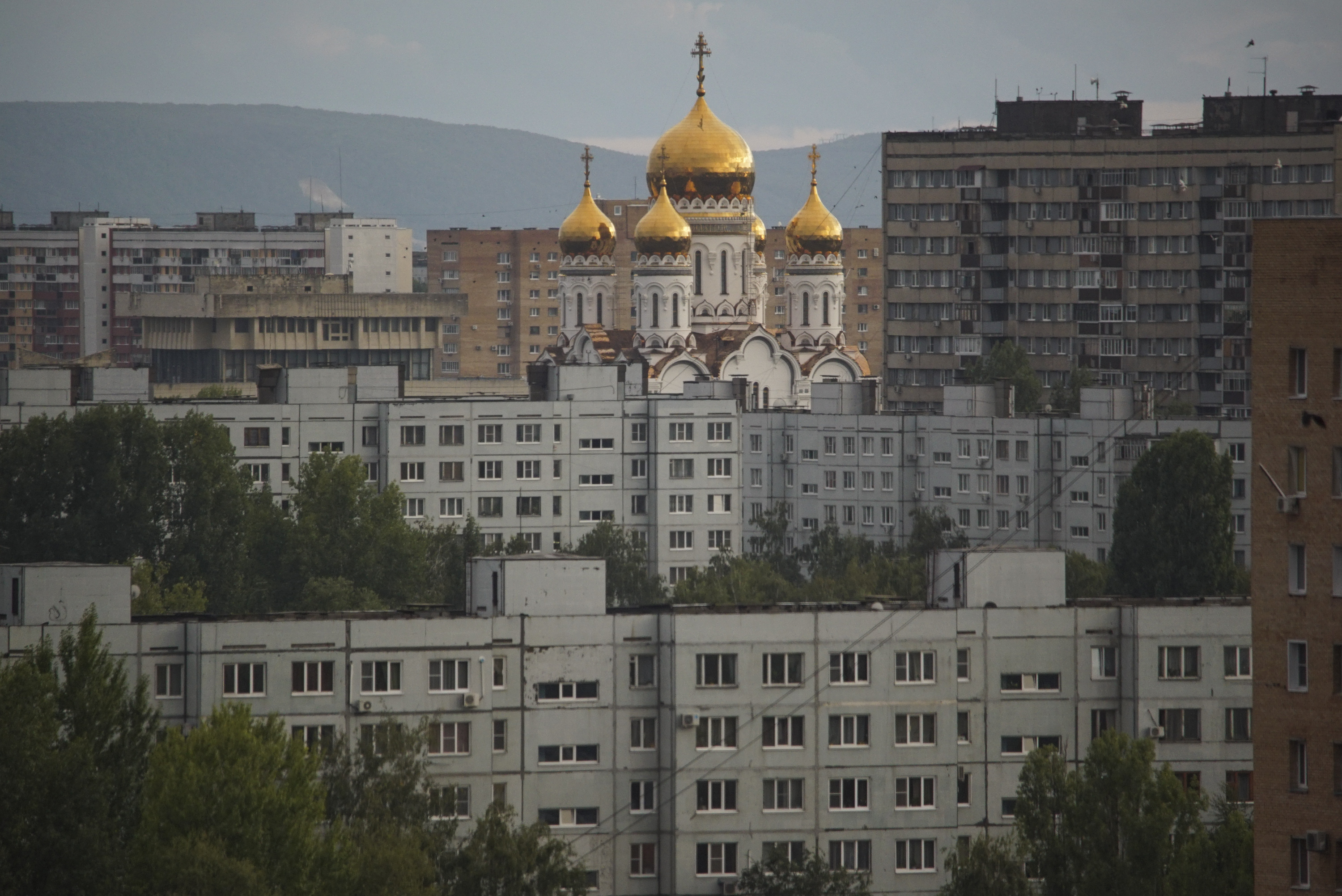
The Transfiguration Cathedral can be seen from many quarters of the Avtozavodsky district.

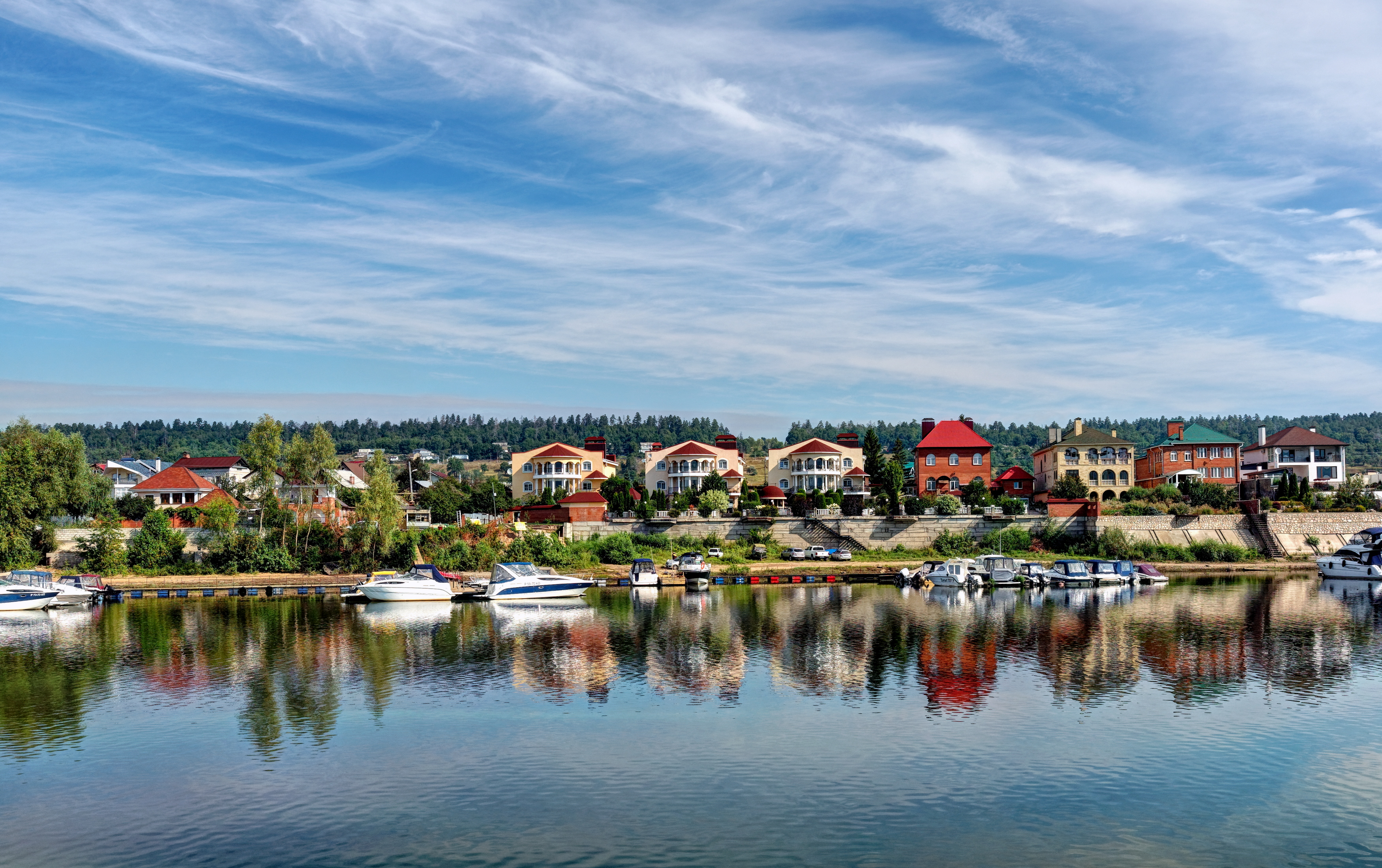
Volga, Tolyatti

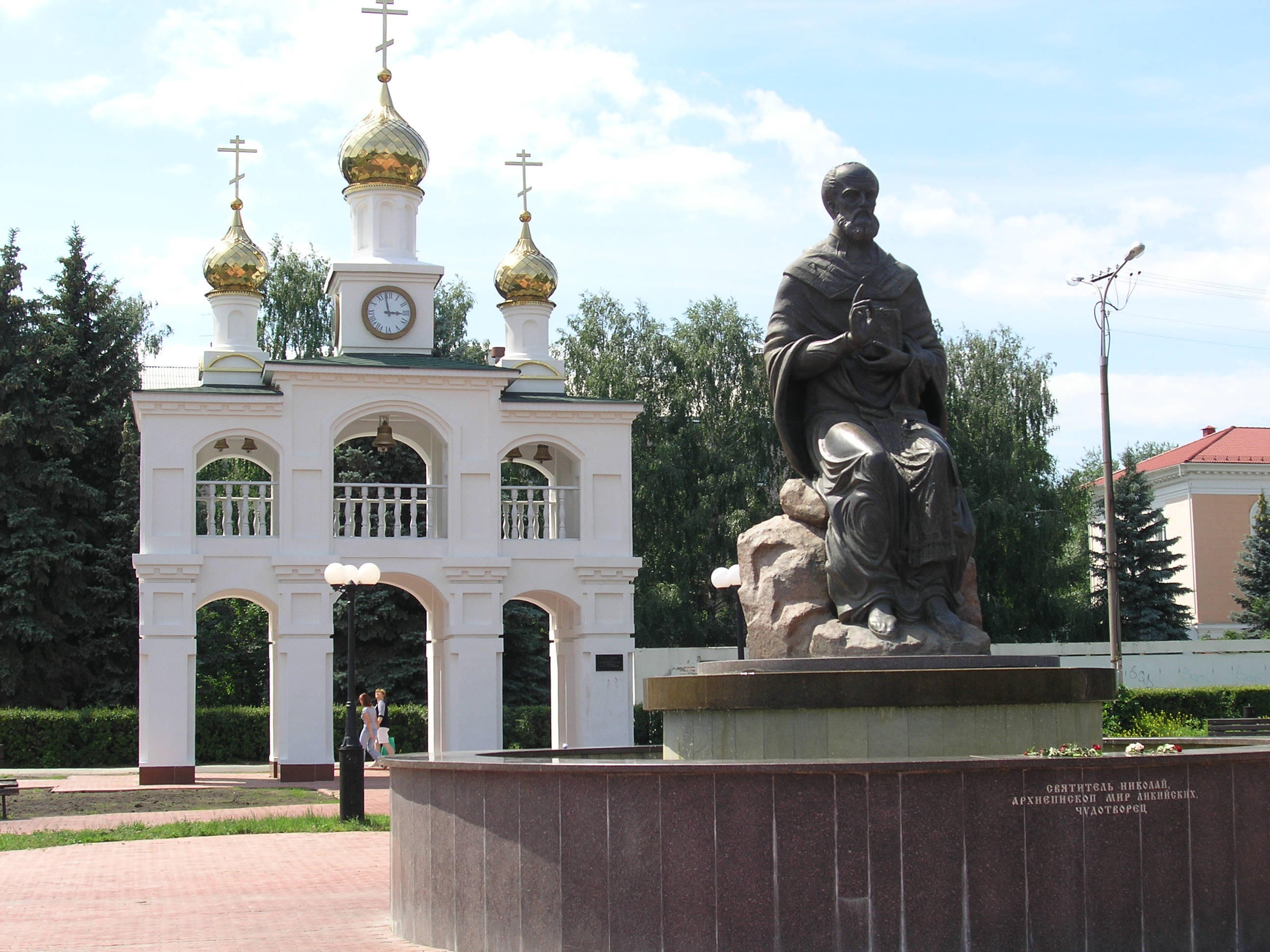
Memorial to builders of city

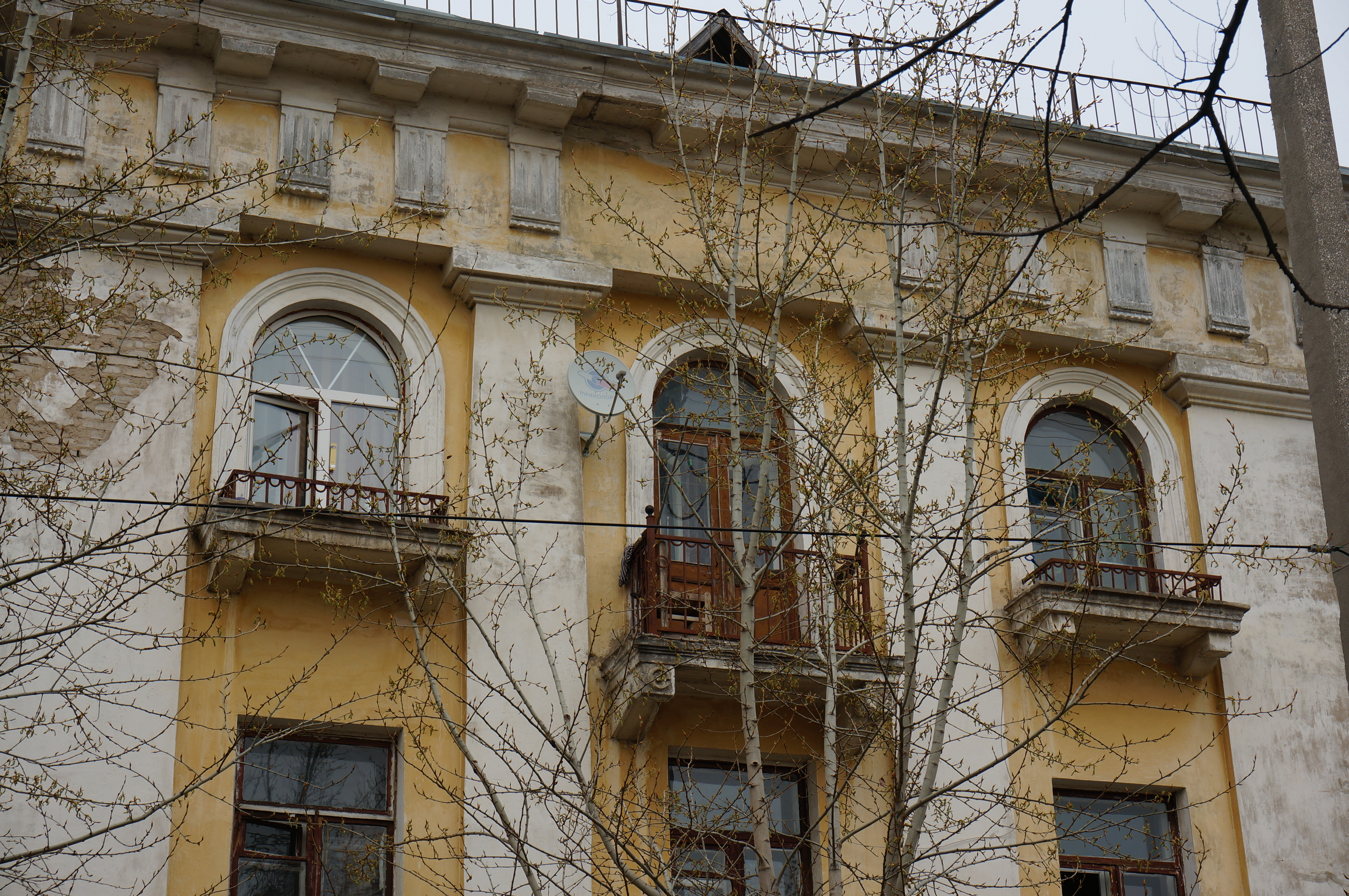
Historical house on Nikonova street

== See also ==
- Monastery of the Theotokos of Iveron
