= Bogatovsky District =

Bogatovsky District Богатовский район (Russian)
- District
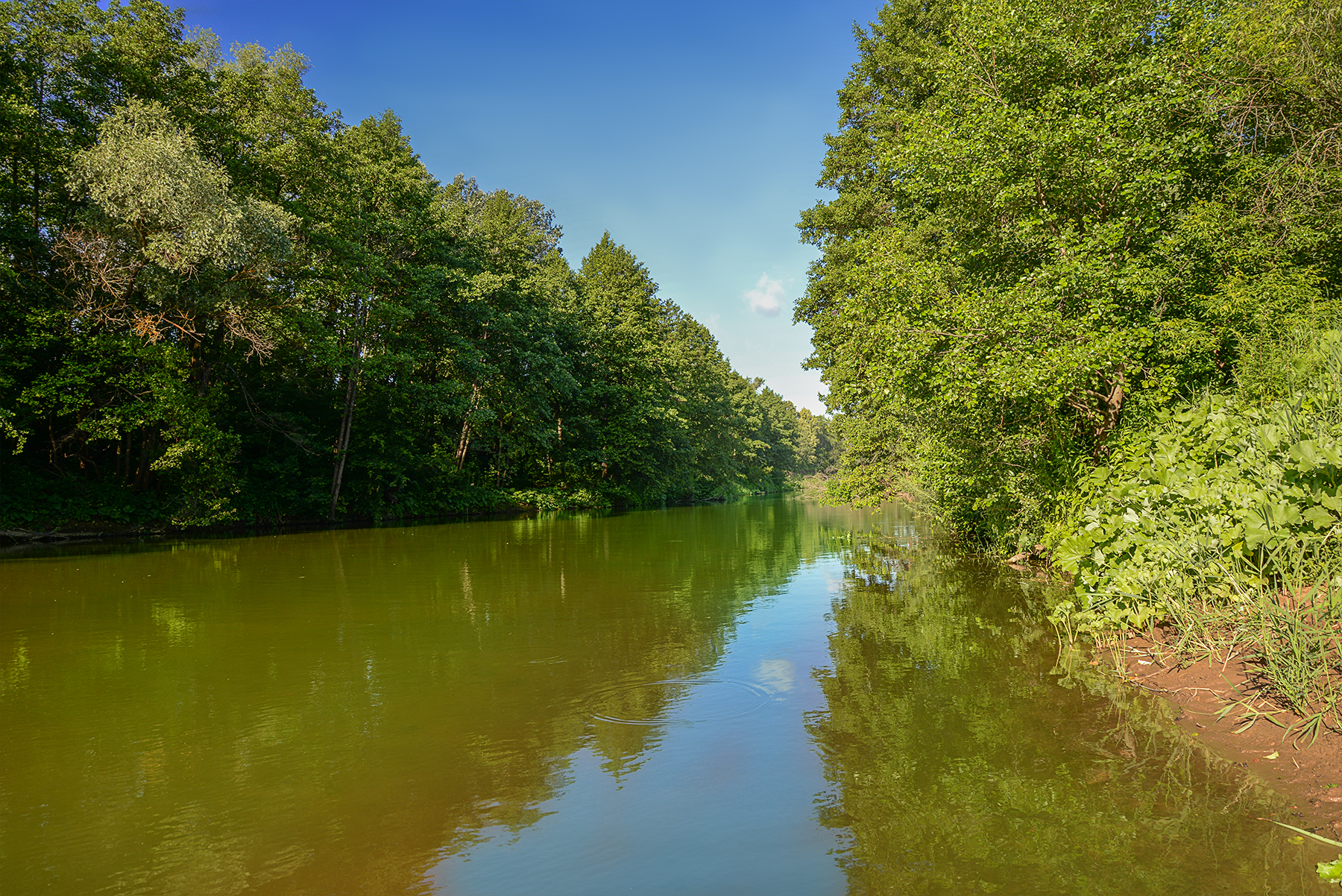
- The Borovka River in Buzuluksky Bor National Park, Bogatovsky District

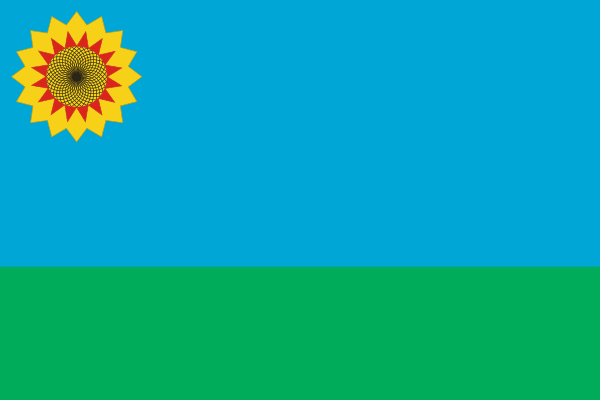
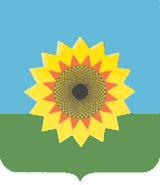
- Flag Coat of arms
- Location of Bogatovsky District in Samara Oblast
- Coordinates: 53°04′N 51°20′E
- Country: Russia
- Federal subject: Samara Oblast
- Established: 25 January 1935
- Administrative center: Bogatoye

Area
  - Total: 824 km^{2} (318 sq mi)

Population (2010 Census)
  - Total: 14,142
  - Density: 17.2/km^{2} (44.5/sq mi)
  - Urban: 0%
  - Rural: 100%

Administrative structure
  - Inhabited localities: 32 rural localities

Municipal structure
  - Municipally incorporated as: Bogatovsky Municipal District
  - Municipal divisions: 0 urban settlements, 5 rural settlements
- Time zone: UTC+4 (MSK+1)
- OKTMO ID: 36606000
- Website: http://bogatoe.samregion.ru

Population of Bogatovsky District
- 2010 Census: 14,142
- 2002 Census: 15,565
- 1989 Census: 15,401
- 1979 Census: 15,570

Bogatovsky District (Russian: Бога́товский райо́н) is an administrative and municipal district (raion), one of the twenty-seven in Samara Oblast, Russia. It is located in the east of the oblast. The area of the district is 824 square kilometers (318 sq mi). Its administrative center is the rural locality (a selo) of Bogatoye. As of the 2010 Census, the total population of the district was 14,142, with the population of Bogatoye accounting for 41.9% of that number.
