= Timeline of the Russo-Ukrainian war (1 September 2025 – 31 December 2025) =

Timeline of the Russo-Ukrainian war (2022–present)
- Prelude; (up to 23 February 2022); Initial invasion; (24 February – 7 April 2022); Southeastern front; (8 April – 28 August 2022); 2022 Ukrainian counteroffensives; (29 August – 11 November 2022); Second stalemate; (12 November 2022 – 7 June 2023); 2023 Ukrainian counteroffensive; (8 June 2023 – 31 August 2023); 2023 Ukrainian counteroffensive, cont.; (1 September – 30 November 2023); 2023–2024 winter campaigns; (1 December 2023 – 31 March 2024); 2024 spring and summer campaigns; (1 April – 31 July 2024); 2024 summer–autumn offensives; (1 August – 31 December 2024); 2025 winter–spring offensives; (1 January 2025 – 31 May 2025); 2025 summer offensives; (1 June 2025 – 31 August 2025); 2025 autumn–winter offensives; (1 September 2025 – 31 December 2025); 2026 winter–spring offensives; (1 January 2026 – 31 May 2026); 2026 summer offensives; (1 June 2026 – 31 August 2026); 2026 autumn–winter offensives; (1 September 2026 – present)

This timeline of the Russo-Ukrainian war covers the period from 1 September 2025 to 31 December 2025.

== September 2025 ==
=== 1 September ===
The HUR claimed to have destroyed two Russian Mi-8 helicopters in a drone attack on Hvardiiske air base near Simferopol, and damaged a military tugboat using a warhead in Sevastopol Bay.

A power substation caught fire after it was struck by falling drone debris in Kropotkin, Krasnodar Krai. The traction station supplied power to the railway transport network between Krasnodar and the Black Sea. Airports at Saratov and Volgograd also shut down operations for several hours due to drone attacks.

The Ukrainian military claimed to have retaken Novoekonomichne in Donetsk Oblast. The ISW assessed Ukrainian forces only managed to take half of the settlement up to Myru Street.

Deepstate UA confirmed Russian forces took Komyshuvakha village in Donetsk Oblast. An official of the Donetsk People's Republic claimed Russia forces took the villages of Muravka, Zeleny Hai and Oleksandrohrad, along the Dnipropetrovsk Oblast border.

The SBU charged the head of Chechnya, Ramzan Kadyrov, in absentia with war crimes against Ukrainian soldiers, including ordering his fighters to kill Ukrainian troops on the battlefield rather than take them prisoner and turn POWs into human shields against drone strikes in Grozny.

=== 2 September ===
One person was killed in a Russian drone strike on Bila Tserkva, Kyiv Oblast.

The Ukrainian military claimed to have retaken Udachne in Donetsk Oblast.

Thirteen Ukrainian drones were downed over Rostov-on-Don. Falling unexploded debris forced the evacuation of some 320 people from a high rise apartment. Three people, according to the local governor, were injured including a child, while several buildings were damaged as well.

Geolocated footage showed Russian forces took Myrove village, northwest of Kupiansk. Russian forces claimed to have taken the village of Sobolivka and severed the P-79 Kupyansk-Chuhuiv highway, west of Kupiansk, as well as the villages of Fedorivka southwest of Siversk, and Dachne south of Novopavlivka.

=== 3 September ===
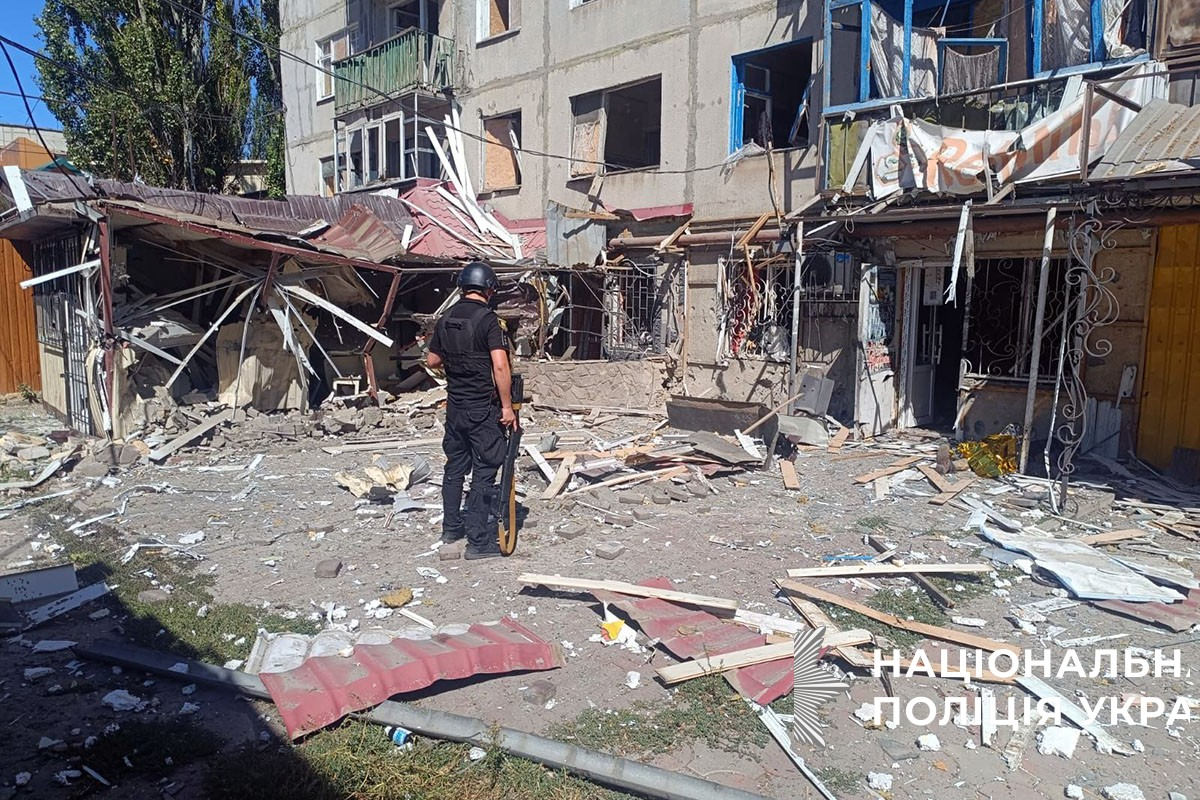
Apartment building in Kostiantynivka after the attack

Nine people were killed by Russian shelling in Kostiantynivka. One person was killed in a Russian air attack in Khmelnytskyi Oblast. The Polish military said two drones temporarily entered the country's airspace during a Russian air attack on western and central Ukraine.

The Ukrainian Navy claimed to have destroyed a Russian naval speedboat attempting to unload airborne soldiers at the Tendra Spit, killing seven soldiers and injuring four others.

A Russian court-martial sentenced four Ukrainian POWs captured in Bryansk Oblast to up to 28 years' imprisonment on charges of conducting sabotage and reconnaissance operations against military and industrial facilities within Russia. It also sentenced Telegram channel administrators Heorhiy Levchenko (Ria-Melitopol) and Vladyslav Gershon (Melitopol tse Ukraina) of Melitopol to up to 16 years' and 15 years' imprisonment for spying on Russian positions and distributing anti-Russian propaganda on Telegram.

The Danish government announced production of solid rocket fuel for the Ukrainian FP-5 Flamingo missile will start in Denmark from 1 December 2025.

Geolocated footage showed Russian forces took the village of Oleksandro-Shultyne near Kostiantynivka.

=== 4 September ===
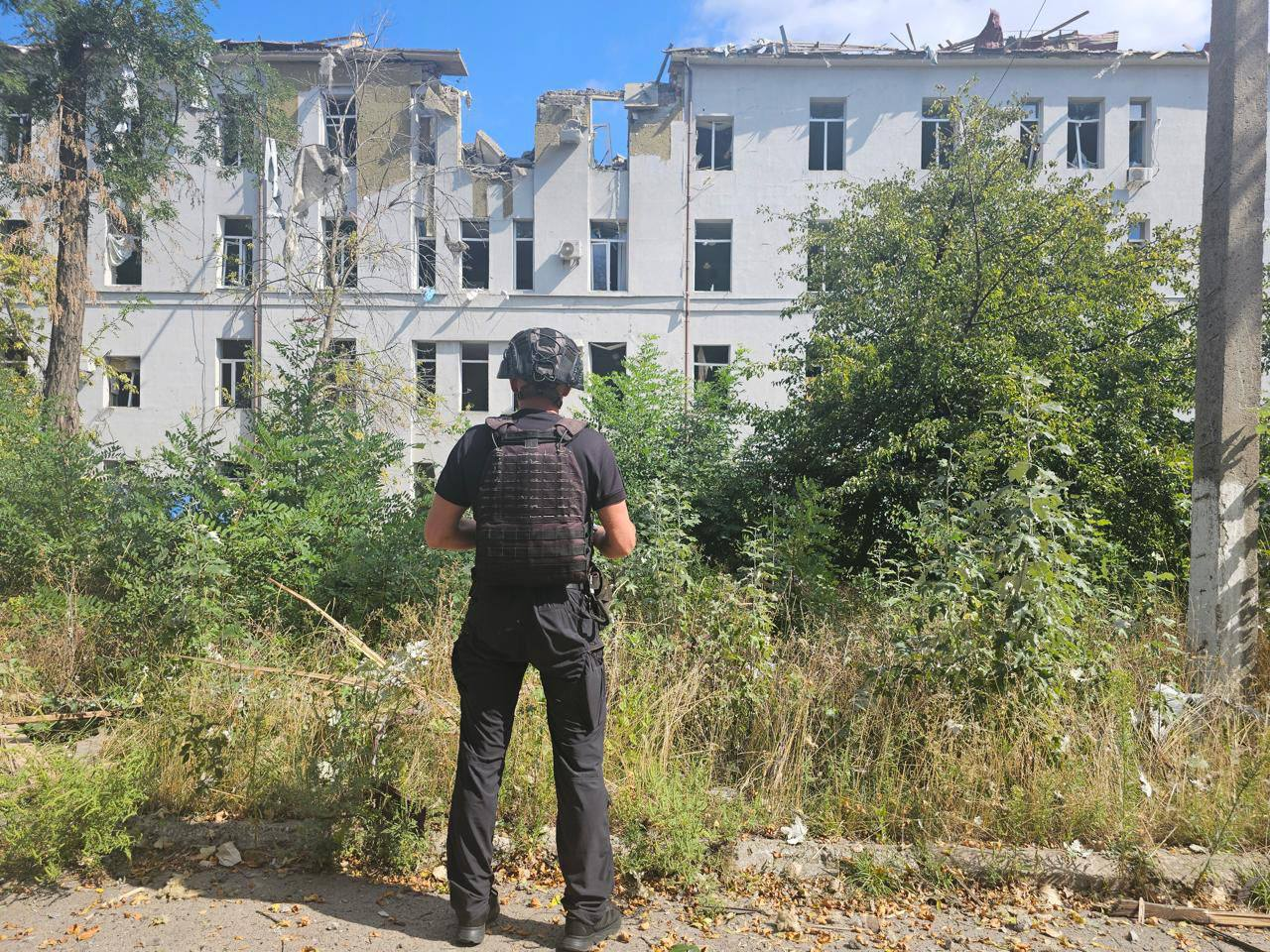
Hospital in Kostiantynivka after the bombing on 4 September

Two deminers working for the Danish Refugee Council were killed while on duty by a Russian Iskander missile strike near Chernihiv.

Geolocated footage showed Russian forces took Novoselivka village, east of Velykomykhailivka.

=== 5 September ===
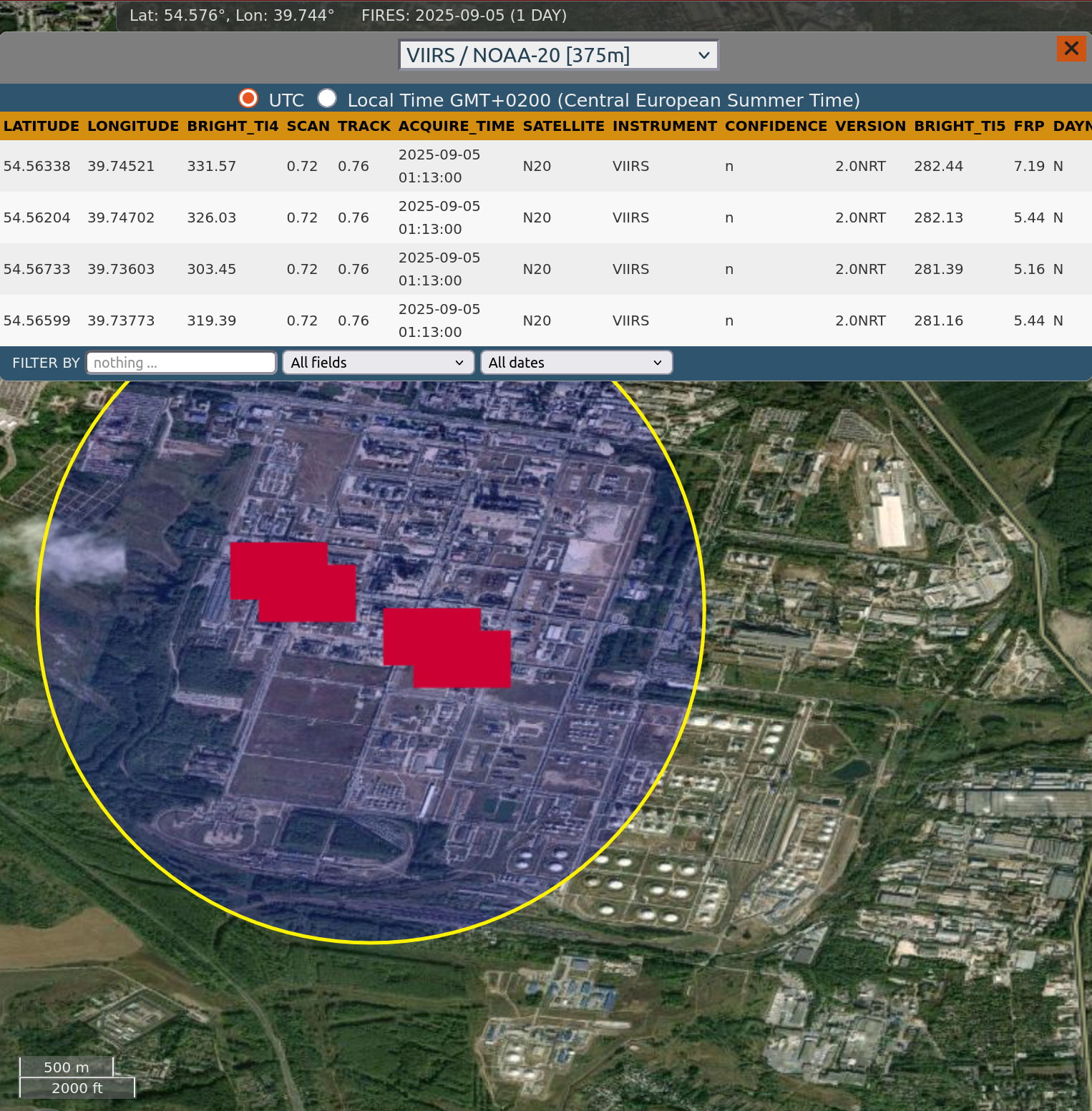
NASA's FIRMS detected fires on 5 September 2025 01:13:00 (UTC) at the Ryazan refinery

The Ukrainian military claimed to have carried out drone strikes on an oil depot in Luhansk Oblast and Rosneft's largest refinery, located in Ryazan.

The Russian Ministry of Defense claimed Russian forces took Markove village, northeast of Kostiantynivka.

=== 6 September ===
Geolocated footage indicated Russian troops advanced north of Myrolyubivka, northeast of Pokrovsk; and in east Sichneve, southeast of Velykomykhailivka.

The SBU arrested former MP Fedir Khrystenko on charges of treason for collaborating with Russia.

=== 7 September ===
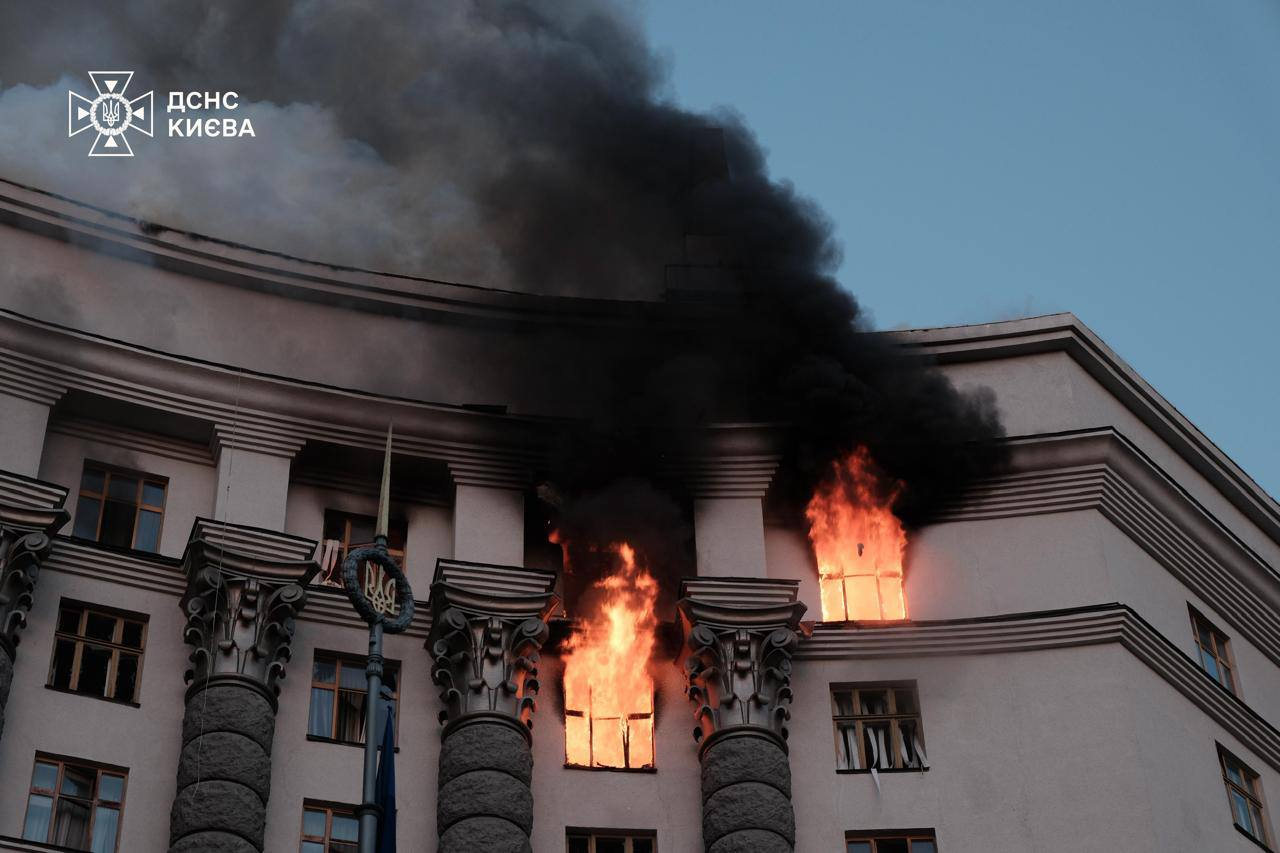
Ukrainian Government Building after the attack

The Ukrainian Air Force said Russia launched 810 drones and 13 missiles towards Ukraine, of which 747 drones and four missiles were intercepted. A fire erupted on top of the Ukrainian Government Building housing the Cabinet of Ministers of Ukraine in Pecherskyi District of Kyiv; there were conflicting reports on whether an Iskander missile or a shot-down UAV caused the fire. Five people were killed while several residential buildings were damaged.

Ukrainian drones struck the Stalnoy kon pipeline in Bryansk Oblast and the Ilsky oil refinery in Krasnodar Krai. Commander of the Unmanned Systems Forces Robert Brovdi claimed Ukrainian drones struck a pumping station in Vladimir Oblast which feeds diesel into the Moscow Ring Oil Product Pipeline.

The Russian Defense Ministry claimed Russian forces took the village of Khoroshe, southeast of Velykomykhailivka.

=== 8 September ===
Ukrainian military observer Kostyantyn Mashovets claimed Ukrainian forces retook Bezsalivka near Tyotkino on the Ukrainian border. The Ukrainian military also claimed to have retaken the village of Zarichne in Donetsk Oblast, along the road between Sloviansk and Lyman.

The FSB arrested an Azerbaijani citizen accused of joining an unidentified Ukrainian terrorist organization and conducting surveillance of potential targets in Stavropol and Yessentuki.

The HUR claimed to have disabled three gas and oil pipelines in Zheleznodorozhny, Penza Oblast with a capacity of 2 million barrels a day. At least four explosions were reported. The Kuibyshev-Lysychansk pipeline in Saratov Oblast was claimed to have been disabled, with an "annual capacity of 82 million metric tons". Saratov Central Airport was shut down due to threats of drone strikes.

Ukrainian-made cruise missiles struck three Russian command posts in occupied Donetsk Oblast, including one belonging to the 41st Guards Combined Arms Army, the 20th Motor Rifle Division and "an army-level headquarters" in the Topaz plant in Kuibyshevskyi District, Donetsk.

Commander of the Unmanned Systems Forces Robert Brovdi claimed drones from the 14th Unmanned Regiment struck the Vtorovo station in the settlement of Penkino, Vladimir Oblast.

=== 9 September ===
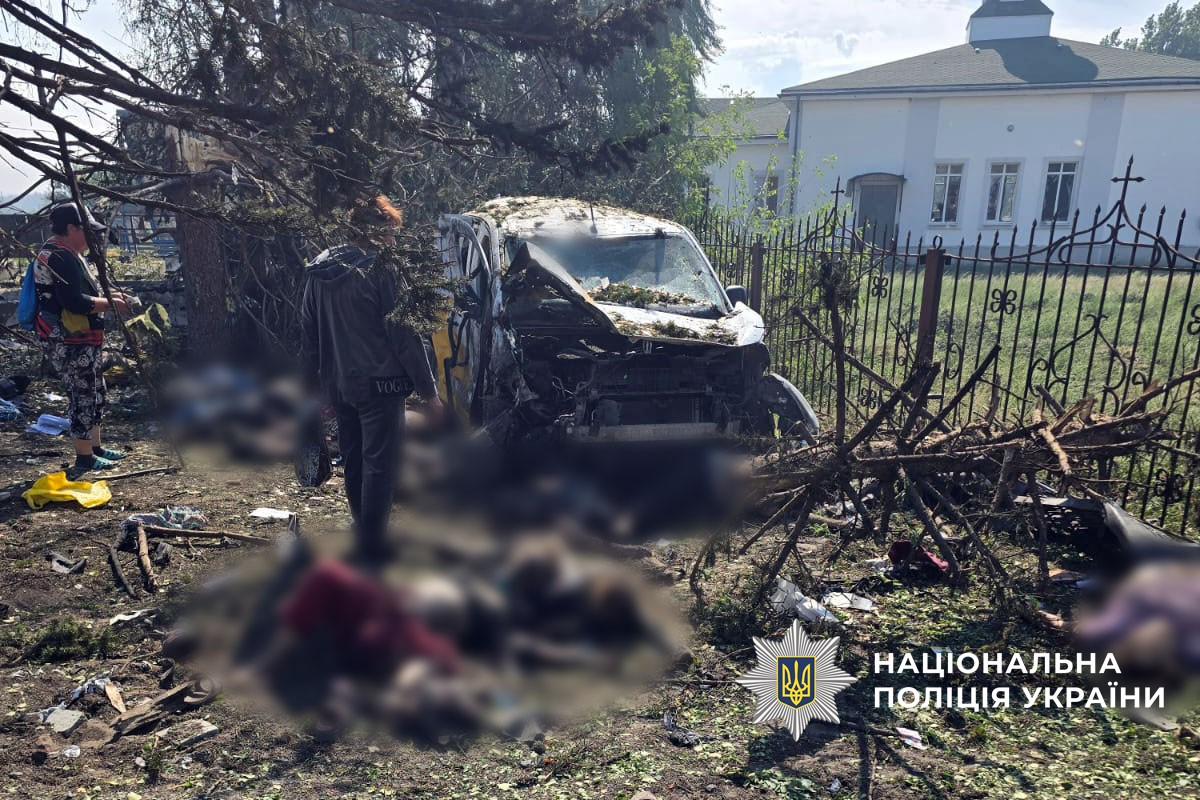
Place of the strike on Yarova

At least 25 people were killed and 18 injured in a Russian airstrike on the village of Yarova in Donetsk Oblast.

The HUR claimed to have carried out an attack on a Russian 48Ya6-K1 Podlet low-altitude radar and an RLM-M module from the 55Zh6M Nebo-M air defense complex in Crimea, destroying the RLM-M module.

The governor of Krasnodar Krai claimed one person was killed in a Ukrainian drone strike on Sochi.

Geolocated footage showed Ukrainian forces advanced in Katerynivka village, while Russian forces advanced in east Muravka, Donetsk Oblast.

=== 10 September ===
Poland said it shot down Russian drones which violated its airspace during a Russian attack on Ukraine.

The governor of Belgorod Oblast claimed the regional government building was damaged in a Ukrainian drone strike.

The HUR claimed to have struck and disabled an unspecified Project MPSV07 salvage ship in Novorossiysk Bay in Krasnodar Krai.

Ukrainian drones struck infrastructure connected to the Russian 40th Command and Measurement Complex, responsible for parts of the Russian space program. Drones managed to bypass Russian air defenses and damaged the headquarters building and the main communications hub.

A Russian Pantsir-S1 was destroyed by a Ukrainian RAM-2X drone at Luhansk International Airport.

Russian forces claimed to have retaken the settlement of Novoekonomichne near Pokrovsk.

=== 11 September ===
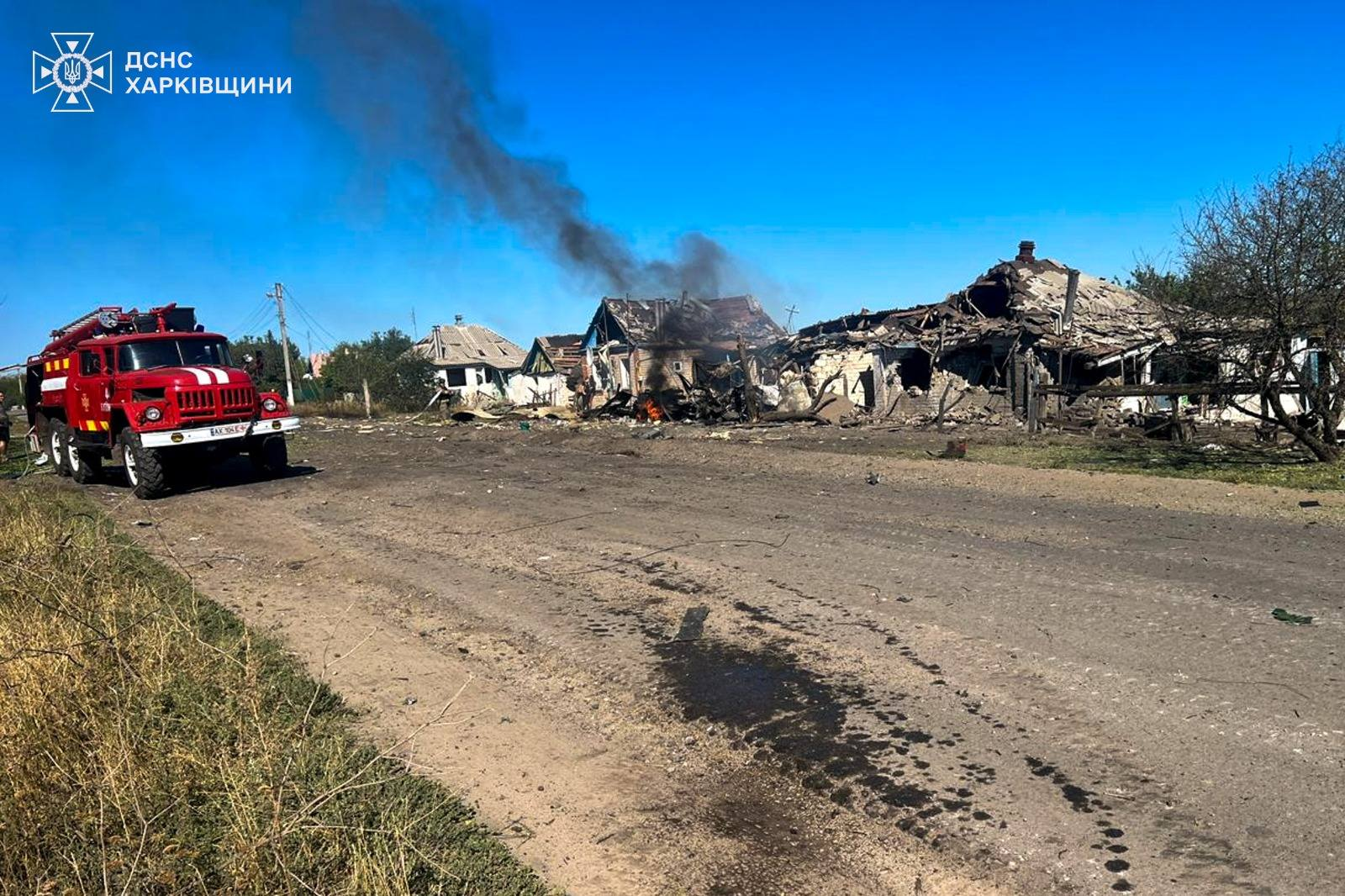
Street of the village Hrushivka (Kharkiv Oblast) bombed on 11 September

The Holy Resurrection Cathedral in Sumy was damaged by a Russian drone attack. Mayor of Moscow Sergey Sobyanin stated nine drones were intercepted on their way to the city.

The Ukrainian Navy claimed to have carried out an attack on a communications center of the Russian Black Sea Fleet's 184th Research and Testing Facility in Sevastopol.

Atesh partisans claimed to have destroyed a communications tower belonging to an "air defense factory" in Tula.

Ukrainian Air Force pilot Oleksandr Borovyk was killed in action during a combat mission aboard a Sukhoi Su-27 over the Zaporizhzhia front.

Ukrainian military observer Kostyantyn Mashovets stated Russian infiltration groups were seen operating near Blahodativka, Kindrativka and Myrove, all near Kupiansk. Mashovets stated Russian forces took the village of Serednie, northwest of Lyman. In Velykomykhailivka, the Russian defense ministry claimed to have taken the village of Sosnivka. Geolocated footage showed Russian forces likely took the villages of Khoroshe and Vorone as well.

=== 12 September ===
Russian forces were reported to have entered Kupiansk using a gas pipeline that ran eight kilometres (5.0 mi) from Russian positions in Lyman Pershyi.

The governor of Belgorod Oblast claimed one person was killed in a Ukrainian drone attack on Belgorod city.

SBU drones struck and damaged two oil tankers, the Kusto and Cai Yun, in the port of Primorsk, Leningrad Oblast. According to the local governor, Aleksandr Drozdenko, more than 30 drones were downed. Locals reported smoke and explosions, describing it as "one of the largest attacks" since the full scale invasion. Other attacks were reported in Leningrad Oblast. Lukoil's facility in Smolensk was set ablaze, and Russian officials claimed 221 drones were shot down, including nine over Moscow Oblast. The Vtorovo Fuel Facility was also struck by Ukrainian drones, part of the oil pipeline Vtorovo→Tuma→Ryazan, responsible for pumping gas and oil to Moscow. Damage was reported to two fuel tanks along with various power cables and pipelines used to maintain pressure in the pipeline.

A suspected Russian STC Orlan-10 drone washed up on a beach in Burgas, Bulgaria.

Geolocated footage showed Ukrainian forces retook the village of Filiia, south of Novopavlivka. Near Velykomykhailivka, geolocated footage showed Russian forces took the villages of Ternove and Komyshuvakha.

=== 13 September ===
Three people were killed by Russian shelling in Kostiantynivka, while one person was killed in a separate attack in Borova, Kharkiv Oblast.

Russia claimed to have taken the village of Novomykolaivka in Synelnykove Raion, Dnipropetrovsk Oblast. A Russian milblogger claimed Russian forces retook the villages of Bezsalivka, Kindrativka, and Andriivka in Sumy Oblast.

Russian media reported the Novo-Ufimsky oil refinery in Bashkortostan was attacked by drones. The head of Bashkortostan, Radiy Khabirov, said drones were shot down by small arms fire, but falling debris started a fire.

Metafrax Chemicals, an ammonia manufacturer in Perm Krai, was attacked by drones. Local officials said the facility continued normal operations and there were no casualties.

Two officers from the National Guard of Russia were killed and one was critically injured during an explosion in Oryol Oblast that delayed some 10 trains. The explosion occurred while victims were clearing mines from the Oryol-Kursk railway line discovered by rail personnel on the Maloarkhangelsk — Glazunovka section. The HUR claimed responsibility for the attack.

A drone violated Romanian airspace over Tulcea County during a Russian strike on Ukraine.

=== 14 September ===
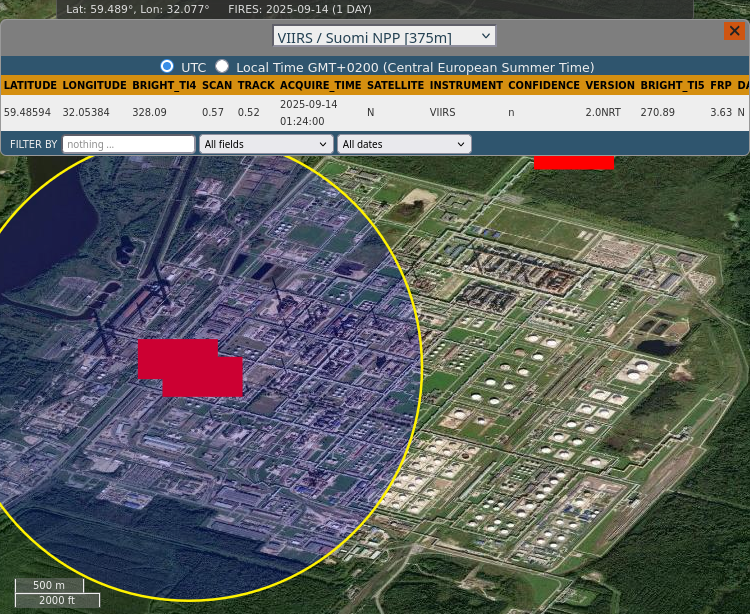
NASA's FIRMS detected fire on 14 September 2025 01:24:00 (UTC) at the Kirishi oil refinery. The topmost detection is consistent with a refinery gas flare.

The Kirishi oil refinery in Leningrad Oblast was set ablaze by Ukrainian drones according to Governor Alexander Drozdenko. He claimed three drones were shot down but falling debris set fire to the refinery.

A Russian Buk-M3 was destroyed by HUR drones in Zaporizhzhia Oblast.

Geolocated footage showed Russian forces advanced east of Kozatske, Pokrovsk Raion; and in east Stepnohirsk in Zaporizhzhia Oblast.

=== 15 September ===
One person was killed in a Russian air attack on Zaporizhzhia city.

The National Guard of Ukraine claimed to have cleared Russian troops from Pankivka village in Donetsk Oblast following a joint operation with the Ukrainian military. Russian forces entered the settlement of Yampil in Donetsk Oblast.

Belgorod Oblast Governor Vyacheslav Gladkov claimed a Ukrainian drone killed two women in Golovchino village, ten kilometres (6.2 mi) from the Ukrainian border. Three others were injured and a car was destroyed.

Denmark opened a rocket fuel plant for Flamingo missiles, temporarily suspending 20 laws and regulations in the process.

Geolocated footage showed Russian advances in central Kupyansk and southwest of Stepova Novoselivka; and southwest of Horikhove, Pokrovsk Raion. Geolocated footage also implied Russian forces captured Olhivske village in Zaporizhzhia.

=== 16 September ===
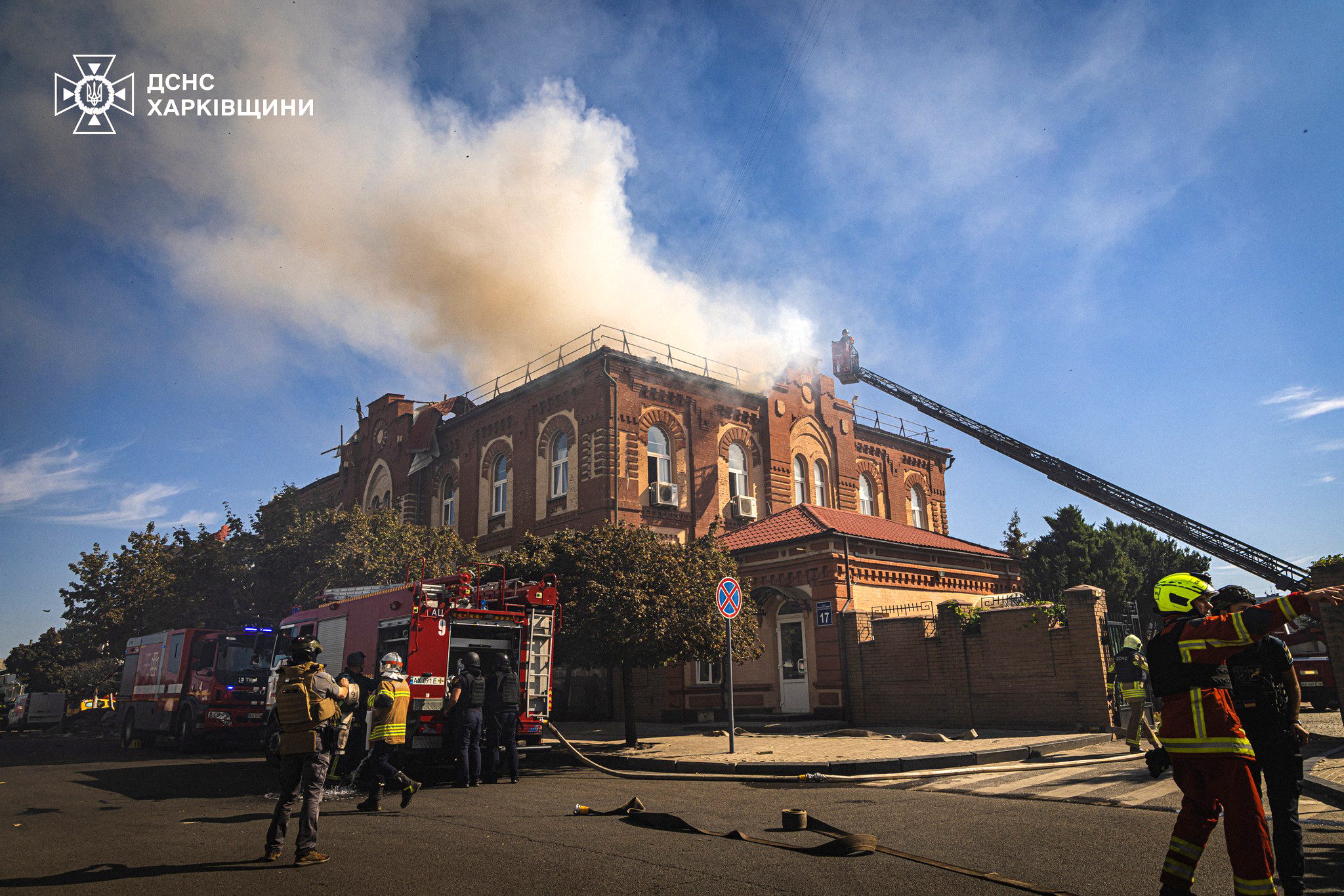
One of the buildings of the National University of Pharmacy in Kharkiv after the strike

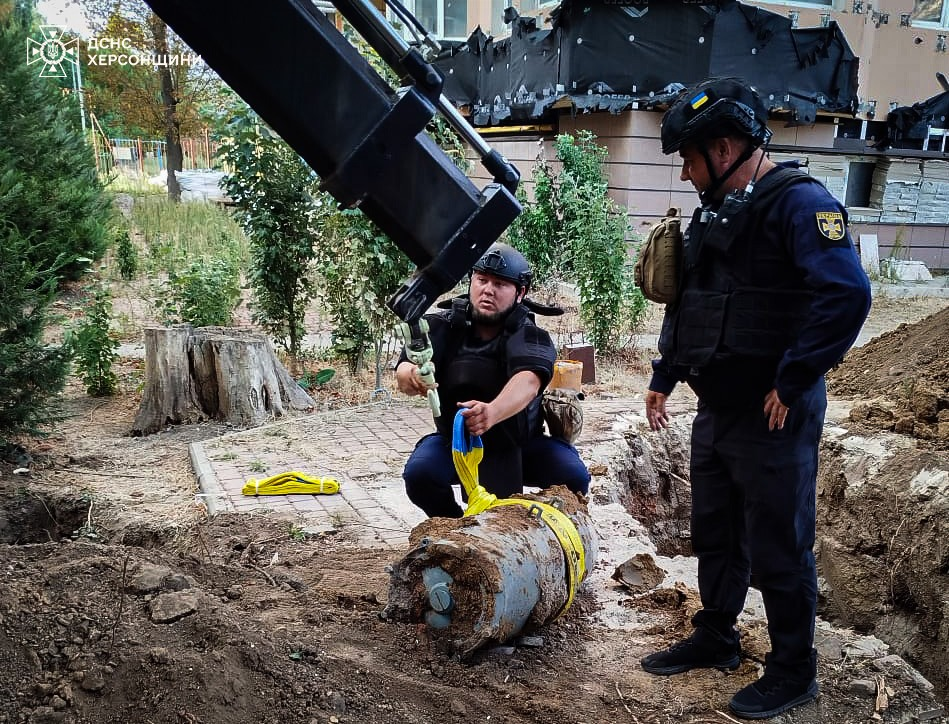
Removal of an unexploded Russian bomb dropped on Kherson

The administrative building of the National University of Pharmacy in Kharkiv's Slobidskyi District was set on fire by a Russian drone attack that injured four people.

The Saratov Oil Refinery was set on fire by drones. The Russian MoD claimed to have intercepted 87 drones, including 18 over Saratov Oblast.

The HUR claimed to have struck the Russian 155th Guards Naval Infantry Brigade headquarters in Vladivostok. The Primorsky Krai Anti-Terrorist Commission claimed "gas equipment exploded near administrative buildings". Local soldiers claimed it was a training exercise.

The Verkhovna Rada resumed live broadcasts of its sessions following a three-year ban it imposed due to security reasons following the 2022 invasion.

US President Donald Trump authorised the first two U.S. military aid packages paid for by NATO.

A court in Italy ordered the extradition of Serhii Kuznietsov to Germany over the investigation into the Nord Stream pipelines sabotage.

The FSB arrested a woman who allegedly worked for Ukrainian intelligence and detonated a bomb along a section of the Trans-Siberian Railway in Zabaykalsky Krai in August.

Geolocated footage indicated Russian advances northwest of Stupochky village in Donetsk Oblast; and southwest of Novoivanivka, Huliaipole Raion.

=== 17 September ===
A Russian drone struck a minibus in Prymorske, Zaporizhzhia Oblast, injuring one person.

The Ukrainian military claimed to have captured a Kenyan national fighting in the Russian army near Vovchansk.

Atesh operatives sabotaged rail relay equipment near Yekaterinburg.

The FSB arrested and later charged a North African resident of Astrakhan for spying on behalf of Ukraine.

Geolocated footage showed Ukrainian advances in southwest Chasiv Yar; and the Russian capture of Troianda village in Pokrovsk. Geolocated footage also showed Russian advances in Prymorske, Zaporizhzhia Oblast.

=== 18 September ===
Five people were killed in a Russian airstrike on Kostiantynivka.

Gazprom's refinery in Bashkortostan was set ablaze by Ukrainian drones. The Lukoil-Volgogradneftepererabotka oil refinery in Volgograd was also attacked with locals reporting explosions. The local governor reported no casualties but a private home was damaged. Volgograd International Airport also suspended flights. The Russian MoD claimed to have intercepted 43 drones overnight.

The bodies of 1,000 Ukrainian soldiers killed in action were repatriated by Russia in exchange for 24 Russian soldiers' bodies.

Russian milbloggers claimed Russian forces took the village of Odradne, east of Velykyi Burluk from the Russian side of the Kharkiv Oblast border. Russian milbloggers also claimed Russian forces took the villages of Volodymyrivka and Pankivka in the Dobropillia direction.

Ireland announced military aid for Ukraine involving 34 used military vehicles and three de-mining robots.

A Russian ammunition dump in Bohdanivka, Luhansk Oblast was destroyed by Ukrainian drones.

=== 19 September ===
The HUR claimed to have destroyed a Russian DT-10 Vityaz multi-purpose tracked vehicle and laid mines during a raid on the Tendra Spit.

President Zelenskyy announced Ukraine would allow a limited exportation of "controlled" weapons which would fund an "increase in the production of drones for the front line".

The Russian Defense Ministry claimed Russian forces fully controlled the Serebriansky forest. Geolocated footage showed Russian forces took Muravka town, northeast of Novopavlivka.

=== 20 September ===
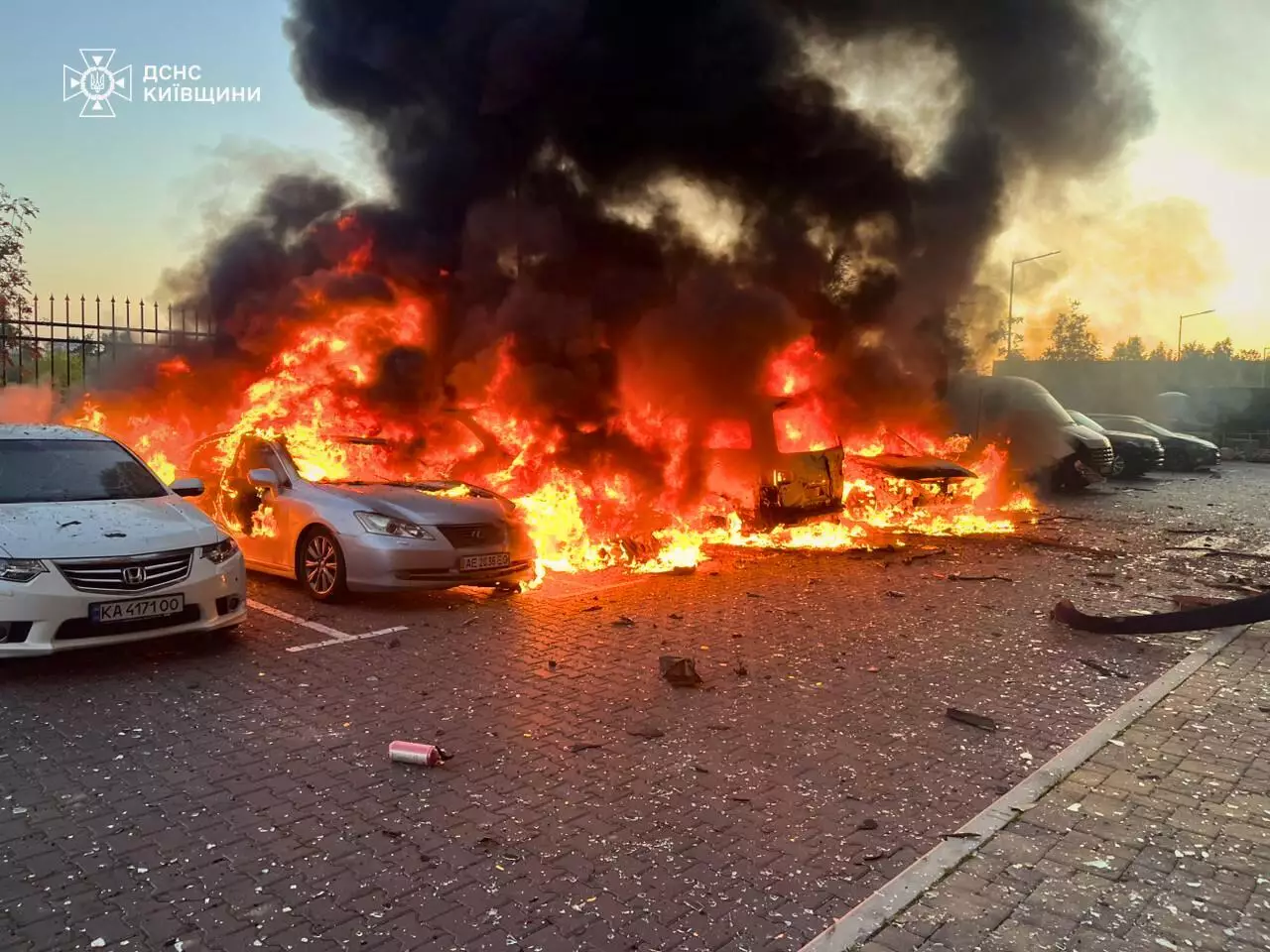
Burning cars in the village of Sofiivska Borshchahivka near Kyiv after the attack

Russia launched a massive air attack on cities across Ukraine, killing three people in Khmelnytskyi, Chernihiv and Dnipro.

Five to seven explosions occurred in Saratov, causing a fire at an oil refinery, after a drone attack. According to the SHOT channel five explosions occurred at the Novokuybyshevsk oil refinery in Samara Oblast. Locals recorded footage of a fire at the refinery, while the pumping stations, on the Kuibyshev-Tikhoretsk pipeline, were also attacked. Four Ukrainian FP-2 drones struck a Russian Rubicon unit position near the Pokrovsk sector.

Russian forces claimed to have taken Filiya town, south of Novopavlivka. Geolocated footage showed Russian forces took Berezove town, south of Velykomykhailivka. Russian forces claimed to have taken Shandryholove in northern Donetsk Oblast.

=== 21 September ===
Atesh claimed its operatives in Smolensk blew up railway tracks that they claimed serves a factory making Kh-59 missiles.

The Ukrainian Ministry of Defense claimed HUR drones destroyed a 55Zh6U Nebo-U radar system and three Mi-8 helicopters in Crimea. The HUR also claimed it had destroyed two Russian Be-12 Chayka amphibious aircraft for the first time in an attack on Crimea's Kacha Airbase, while the Ukrainian military claimed to have destroyed an ІМР-3М engineering and obstacle clearing vehicle following a drone strike.

The Russian-appointed head of Crimea, Sergey Aksyonov, claimed three people were killed while 16 others were injured in a Ukrainian drone attack on Foros.

Russian Colonel General Aleksandr Lapin, who fought against Ukraine during the 2022 Kharkiv counteroffensive and the Kursk campaign, was dismissed from the Russian Army.

A Russian drone strike in Pokrovsk killed one person.

Ukrainian military observer Kostyantyn Mashovets claimed Russian forces took the town of Kindrashivka, north of Kupiansk and Sichneve, east of Velykomykhailivka.

=== 22 September ===
Three people were killed in a Russian airstrike on Zaporizhzhia.

Several settlements in Krasnodar Krai were damaged by Ukrainian drones that were shot down. The Kanevskaya traction substation, which supplies power to the rail network, was damaged. In Slavyansk-on-Kuban three houses and several cars were reported damaged but no casualties. A grass fire was started near an "industrial area". Locals in Temryuk, Krymsk and Primorsko-Akhtarsk reported explosions and air raid sirens.

Russian sources claimed Ukrainian forces retook the town of Nove Shakhove in the Dobropillia direction. The Russian defense ministry claimed Russian forces took the town of Kalynivske, southeast of Velykomykhailivka.

Ukraine said it shot down a Russian Forpost-R combat drone.

=== 23 September ===
One person was killed in a Russian drone strike in Zaporizhzhia.

Russian air defenses intercepted 36 drones near Moscow, according to Mayor Sergey Sobyanin. There were no reports of casualties or damage in Moscow. Flights out of Sheremetyevo International Airport were suspended for four hours, leading to the cancellation of nearly 100 flights. Some 81 drones were shot down across several regions according to the Russian MoD, with seven people reported injured in Belgorod Oblast. Ukrainian drones struck two oil pipelines in Bryansk and Samara Oblasts. In Bryansk Oblast, near the village of Naitopovichi, an ignition on the LVDS Stalnoy Kon pipeline was reported.

Geolocated footage showed Russian forces took Pereizne town, south of Siversk.

=== 24 September ===
The Gazprom Neftekhim Salavat oil refinery was attacked by Ukrainian drones with locals reporting smoke and several explosions according to Astra. Russian authorities claimed two people were killed in a Ukrainian drone attack on Novorossiysk. According to Bloomberg, Ukraine forced a temporary halt to oil exports from the ports of Novorossiysk and Tuapse after Ukrainian naval drones targeted the oil transshipment points at the two ports.

A Ukrainian training ground in Honcharivske, Chernihiv Oblast, was struck by two Iskander ballistic missiles, causing an unspecified number of military casualties.

Ukraine and Syria formally reestablished diplomatic relations that were severed following the decision of President Bashar al-Assad's regime to recognize the independence of the Donetsk and Luhansk People's Republics in June 2022.

Geolocated footage showed Ukrainian advances north of Torske and Zapovidne, and Russian advances in Novoselivka and east Kostyantynivka.

=== 25 September ===
The Ukrainian Air Force claimed to have shot down a Russian Su-34 fighter jet over Zaporizhzhia Oblast. The HUR claimed to have carried out a drone strike on Crimea that destroyed two Russian An-26 transport aircraft, a surface surveillance radar system and the MR-10M1 Mys M1 coastal radar station. The EuroChem-Belorechensk Mineral Fertilizers plant in Krasnodar Krai was attacked by Ukrainian drones. A fire measuring 50 square meters broke out and 140 employees were evacuated. The plant is believed to be used for manufacturing explosives.

The 14th Regiment of the Unmanned Systems Forces struck three gas distribution stations in Shchastia, Sievierodonetsk and Novopskov, all located in Luhansk Oblast.

In Nairobi, Kenya, the Criminal Investigation Department uncovered a human trafficking syndicate that in return for large payments pretend to offer jobs in Moscow but in reality dupes their victims into joining the Russian Army after which they are sent to the front in Ukraine. The Kenyan investigation was prompted by reports of Kenyan men being killed, maimed or taken prisoner in Ukraine. In addition to making arrests the authorities discovered 21 Kenyan men waiting to travel to Russia. Among the arrested was a named Russian who was subsequently deported.

The Russian defense ministry claimed Russian forces took the town of Zarichne, east of Lyman. Russian milbloggers claimed Russian forces took the town of Kuzmynivka south of Siversk and the entirety of Chasiv Yar, ending the battle for the city.

=== 26 September ===
Afipsky refinery in Krasnodar Krai was attacked by Ukrainian drones, setting one of the processing units ablaze. The fire was blamed by local officials on falling debris.

Ukrainian Commander-in-Chief Oleksandr Syrskyi announced the creation of a new branch of the Ukrainian Air Force to combat drone warfare, the Unmanned Air Defence Systems. Ukraine also announced the creation of the Assault Troops (ShV) as a separate branch and a rapid reaction force within the Ukrainian military that would respond to a "breach in the defense, loss of positions, or a settlement."

Zelenskyy said suspected Hungarian reconnaissance drones had entered Ukrainian airspace along their common border.

Russian milbloggers claimed Russian forces took the towns of Katerynivka and Kleban-Byk near Kostiantynivka, Derylove near Lyman, Chunyshyne near Pokrovsk, and Nove Shakhove and Novotoretske near Dobropillia. Russian milbloggers also claimed Russian forces retreated from Pleshchiivka, southeast of Kostyantynivka.

=== 27 September ===
Ukrainian drones struck an oil pumping station in the Russian autonomous republic of Chuvashia, according to its head Oleg Nikolayev, resulting in "minor damage" and the suspension of operations.

A Russian drone struck a car in an unnamed village in Znob-Novhorodsk settlement Hromada, Sumy Oblast, killing one person and injuring another.

Zelenskyy announced Ukraine received a Patriot air defence system from Israel a month prior.

The Russian defense ministry claimed Russian forces took the town of Stepove, south of Velykomykhailivka, and Mayske, north of Chasiv Yar. Russian milbloggers claimed Russian forces took the town of Dorozhnie near Dobropillia.

A Rosgvardiya lieutenant colonel, an aide, and his driver were killed by HUR agents using a car bomb near the village of Tambukan in Stavropol Krai. The HUR claimed to have worked with a local resistance movement.

=== 28 September ===
Russia launched a massive air attack on cities across Ukraine, killing at least four people in Kyiv and injuring at least 80 nationwide. The Polish embassy was damaged after missile debris fell on its roof.

The HUR claimed to have killed four Russian drone operators in an attack on a UAZ-452 van at an airfield in Melitopol.

An "unidentified missile" struck the Belgorod Thermal Power Plant and the Luch Thermal Power Plant, causing a "total blackout" in Belgorod city and surrounding areas.

The head of the Kupiansk City Military Administration, Andrii Besedin, announced the city's closure to civilians.

The head of Kherson Oblast Military Administration, Yaroslav Shanko, stated a Russian attack in Kherson city damaged a power station, leaving the city without electricity.

Geolocated footage showed Ukrainian forces retook the town of Druzhkivka in southern Kharkiv Oblast.

=== 29 September ===
Four Neptune missiles struck the Karachev electrical components plant, which manufactures electrical components for the Russian military. The governor of Moscow Oblast claimed ]two people were killed in a Ukrainian drone strike on Voskresensk.

The 59th Separate Assault Brigade shot down an Mi-8 near the village of Kotliarivka in Pokrovsk Raion, Donetsk Oblast, using a drone.

A drone struck a Rosrezerv owned oil depot in the city of Bologoye, Tver Oblast. A container of aviation fuel was struck and had to be "cooled" by emergency services.

The Russian defense ministry claimed Russian forces took the town of Shandryholove, and a Russian source claimed Russian forces took the town of Boikivka on the Dobropillia front.

Ukrainian forces reportedly shot down a Russian Mil Mi-8 on combat search and rescue duties with an FPV drone in Nadaeyvka, Pokrovsk Raion, Donetsk Oblast, killing several people and injuring several others.

=== 30 September ===
Four people were killed in a Russian drone strike on Chernechchyna, Sumy Oblast. One person was killed in a Russian drone strike on Dnipro.

The Ukrainian Special Operations Forces Command claimed to have destroyed the radar of a S-400 missile system in Crimea using drones.

Acting on a German-issued European Arrest Warrant, Polish authorities arrested a Ukrainian citizen in Pruszków suspected of involvement in the Nord Stream pipelines sabotage.

The 9th Separate Guards Motor Rifle Brigade of the 51st Guards Combined Arms Army opened a school for "training horse-mounted assault teams" in Donetsk.

Geolocated footage showed Ukrainian advances in Druzhelyubivka and Karpivka, and Russian advances in Hrekivka and Zarichne; all on the Borova-Lyman front. Geolocated footage also showed Russian advances east of Sofiivka.

== October 2025 ==
=== 1 October ===
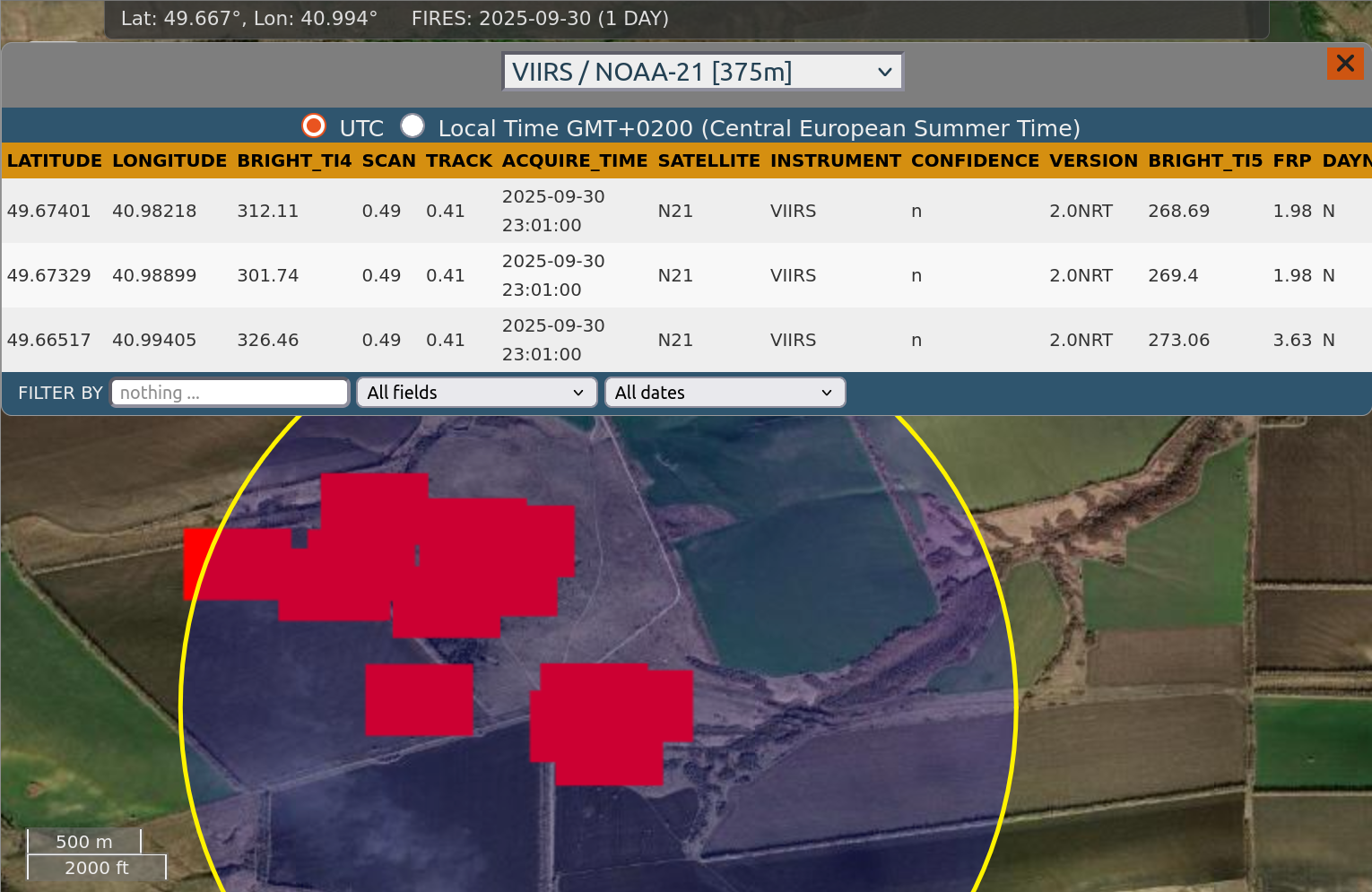
NASA's FIRMS detected fires on 30 September 2025 23:01:00 (UTC) at the Sukodolnaya oil pumping station, Verkhnedonskoy District.

Volodymyr Leontiev, a Russian collaborator in Nova Kakhovka, Kherson Oblast, was killed by a Ukrainian drone.

Rostov Oblast's governor reported drones attacked and caused fire at the Sukodolnaya oil pumping station in Verkhnedonskoy District. According to Russian Telegram channels the attack halted the operations of the facility, which is part of an oil pipeline from Samara Oblast to the Black Sea coast.

A Russian drone struck an electrical substation in Slavutych, Kyiv Oblast, leaving the town with no electricity. A Russian missile strike on Balakliia, Kharkiv Oblast, killed a woman and injured five others.

Russian strikes in Sumy Oblast's critical infrastructure left parts of Konotop and Shostka Raions with no electricity.

The Ukrainian energy ministry said a Russian strike cut power to the confinement structure of the Chernobyl Nuclear Power Plant.

US president Trump reportedly allowed US intelligence agencies to provide Ukraine with information on targets "deep inside" Russia. Additionally, US officials asked other NATO-member countries to similarly support Ukraine.

Russian sources claimed Russian forces seized Verbove and Sichneve, east of Velykomykhailivka.

Ukrainian drones struck two Russian radars in Voronezh Oblast, a P-14F Lena at the Buturlinovka air base and a Sopka-2 in the village of Garmashevka.

=== 2 October ===
Ukraine severed diplomatic relations with Nicaragua after it recognized the four annexed Oblasts and Crimea as part of Russia.

DeepstateUA acknowledged Russian forces took the towns of Olhivske in Zaporizhzhia Oblast, and Berezove and Kalynivske in Dnipropetrovsk Oblast.

Ukraine and Russia conducted a prisoner swap, with 205 Ukrainian POWs and civilians released in exchange for 185 Russian soldiers.

Ukraine revealed a new Neptune missile called the Neptune-D capable of striking land and sea targets, operating without satellite navigation and "terrain-following flight".

In the Dobropillia direction, geolocated footage showed Ukrainian forces retook the town of Dorozhnie, while Russian milbloggers claimed Russian forces retook the town of Pankivka.

=== 3 October ===
In Perm Krai, the Azot chemical plant, which manufactures chemicals used in explosives used by the Russian military, was attacked by Ukrainian drones, causing brief interruptions to operations according to the regional governor Dmitry Makhonin. The Russian MoD claimed 20 drones were intercepted. A Ukrainian Liutyi drone also struck the Orsknefteorgsintez oil refinery in Orsk, Orenburg Oblast, according to footage posted online. Governor Yevgeny Solntsev claimed there were "no disruptions" to operations and no casualties.

A Russian ballistic missile strike hit an energy facility in Donetsk Oblast, leaving Druzhkivka, Kostiantynivka, and parts of Kramatorsk and Sloviansk without electricity. Russian strikes in Donetsk Oblast killed one person and injured four people in Komyshuvakha, injured two people in Kostiantynivka and one person in Novooleksandrivka, Russian strikes injured seven people in Kherson Oblast. Thirteen thousand pigs were killed in a Russian drone strike on a pig farm in Novovodolazka, Kharkiv Oblast.

Geolocated footage showed Ukrainian forces retook the towns of Sosnivka and Verbove, southwest of Velykomykhailivka.

French photojournalist Antoni Lallican was killed by a Russian drone strike on his car, that also injured Ukrainian photojournalist Heorhii Ivanchenko of The Kyiv Independent near Druzhkivka, Donetsk Oblast.

=== 4 October ===
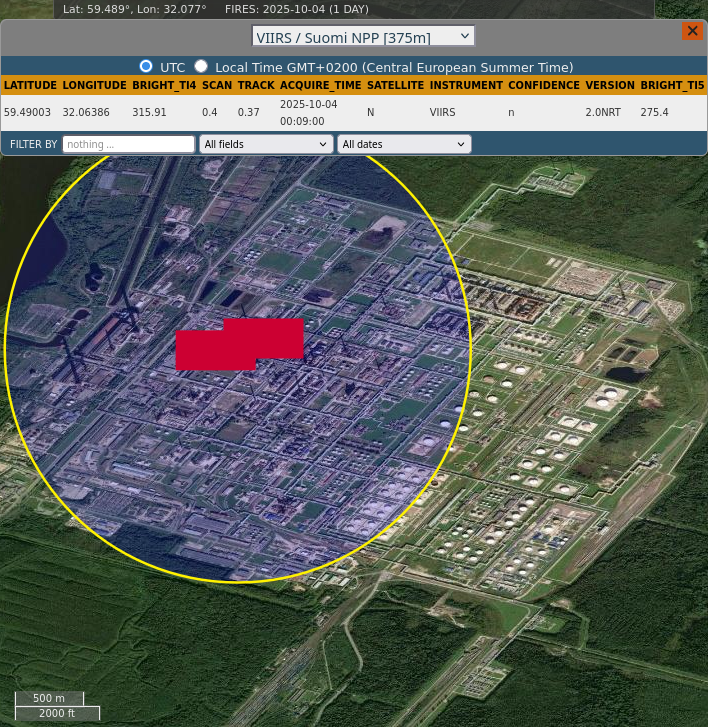
NASA's FIRMS detected fire on 4 October 2025 00:09:00 (UTC) at the Kirishi oil refinery

One person was killed while 30 others were injured in a Russian double tap strike on a railway station in Shostka.

The Kirishi oil refinery in Leningrad Oblast was attacked by Ukrainian drones sparking a fire. According to the local Governor Aleksandr Drozdenko, seven drones were shot down. However videos posted by the Telegram channel Astra showed four explosions occurring at the facility. A Garmon radar complex and ballistic missile loader for an Iskander missile in Kursk were struck. Ukrainian special forces claimed to have attacked and damaged a Buyan-M missile carrier near Lake Onega in the Republic of Karelia.

Geolocated footage showed Russian forces took the town of Fedorivka, southwest of Siversk. A Russian milblogger claimed Russian forces took the town of Ivanivka, southwest of Novopavlivka.

=== 5 October ===
Russia launched a massive air attack on cities across Ukraine, killing four people in Lviv Oblast and one each in Zaporizhzhia and Kherson.

The Russian MoD reported thirty-two Ukrainian drones were shot down over various regions. Locals reported the Kstovo refinery in Nizhny Novgorod Oblast being struck by seven explosions. Power cuts in Belgorod city were reported by the local governor after Ukrainian shelling of "regional energy infrastructure", locals reported the Luch Thermal Power Plant being struck. Seven hospitals switched to backup generators.

Russian milbloggers claimed Russian forces took the town of Zoloty Kolodiaz, northeast of Dobropillia.

=== 6 October ===
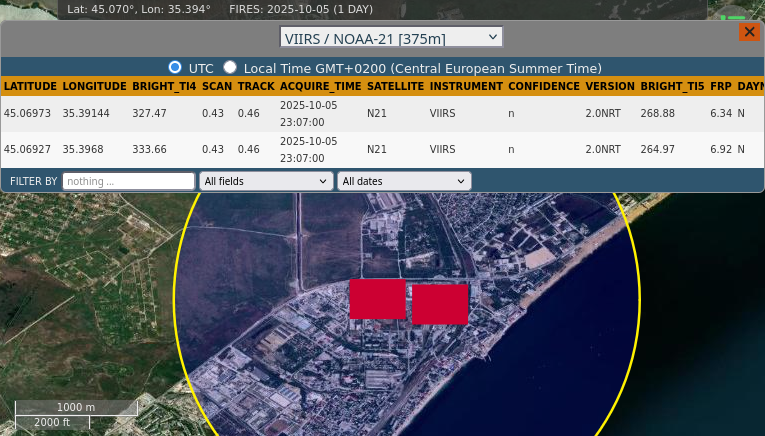
NASA's FIRMS detected fire on 5 October 2025 23:07:00 (UTC) at the Feodosia oil depot.

The Ukrainian military claimed to have carried out a drone attack that destroyed a Russian R-330Zh Zhitel radio jamming station in Luhansk Oblast.

The Sverdlov Plant in Nizhny Novgorod Oblast was set ablaze by Ukrainian drones. A manufacturer of industrial explosives, it had since started supplying military grade explosives for various bombs and missile. The local governor confirmed fires, damaged property and one person who was injured. The marine oil depot at Feodosia in Crimea was attacked as was an ammunition dump for the 18th Combined Arms Army. The oil depot was still burning the following day. Two people were killed in a drone strike in Belgorod.

Parts of Ukrainian-held Donetsk Oblast were left without electricity after Russian forces struck energy facilities.

In Tyumen, 2,000 kilometers from Ukraine, explosions were reported near the local oil refinery. The local governor confirmed the drone attack but claimed no damage or casualties while local enterprises were "operating normally". Three drones were reportedly intercepted.

Ukrainian military observer Konstantyn Mashovets claimed Russian forces took the towns of Ivanivka and Dorozhnie while also re-entering the town of Zoloty Kolodiaz, while Ukrainian forces retook the town of Vilne on the Dobropillia front. Mashovets also claimed Russian forces took the towns of Novoekonomichne and Krasnyi Lyman on the Pokrovsk front.

Kharkiv mayor Ihor Terekhov said Russian airstrikes destroyed two transformer substations in the city.

=== 7 October ===
The Russian-installed governor of Kherson Oblast claimed four people were killed in a Ukrainian drone strike, while Ukrainian authorities said one person was killed in a Russian attack.

Ukrainian forces launched a drone that exploded on a Buk-M2 or Buk-M3 after it had travelled with the missile system for some 15 kilometres.

A suspected Ukrainian drone believed to have been suppressed by Russian electronic warfare systems exploded after hitting a cooling tower at the Novovoronezh Nuclear Power Plant, leaving "a dark mark" on the tower.

HUR-aligned Russian partisans blew up a section of the Stroganovo–Mshinskaya railway, derailing a train carrying military cargo and suspending traffic between St. Petersburg and Pskov. Russian Railways acknowledged the incident but blamed it on "technical reasons".

The Ukrainian 141st Mechanized Brigade claimed to have retaken the village of Sichneve in Dnipropetrovsk Oblast, killing 50 Russian personnel and capturing eight others. Geolocated footage showed Russian advances southwest of Mykolaivka, Donetsk Oblast, and in central Novovasylivske, northeast of Huliaipole.

The SBU arrested a Russian volunteer in the Ukrainian military in Lviv Oblast on suspicion of spying for Russia.

=== 8 October ===
Three people were killed in Russian airstrikes in Sumy Oblast.

The Governor of Belgorod Oblast, Vyacheslav Gladkov, claimed that a Ukrainian missile struck a sports complex in Maslova Pristan, killing three and injuring one.

Geolocated footage showed Ukrainian forces retook the town of Novomykolaivka, northeast of Novopavlivka in Donetsk Oblast, while the Russian defense ministry claimed Russian forces took the town of Novohryhorivka, northeast of Huliaipole.

=== 9 October ===
Ukrainian drones struck the Efimovka oil pumping station and the Lukoil-Korobkovsky Gas Processing Plant in Kotovo, Volgograd Oblast, causing fires. Ukrainian drones set an oil depot on fire in Matveyev Kurgan, Rostov Oblast. Rostov governor Yury Slyusar reported damage to private homes and cars.

Ukrainian authorities ordered the evacuation of children and their guardians from the Kramatorsk area due to increased Russian attacks.

Chornomorsk Mayor Vasyl Huliaiev stated the entire city as well as the Hromada surrounding it aside from Burlacha Balka was left without electricity after Russian strikes.

Russian milbloggers claimed Russian forces seized Volodymyrivka on the Dobropillia front.

Russia and President Zelenskyy confirmed the first use of Flamingo missiles, used alongside the Neptune missile, against targets in Russia.

=== 10 October ===
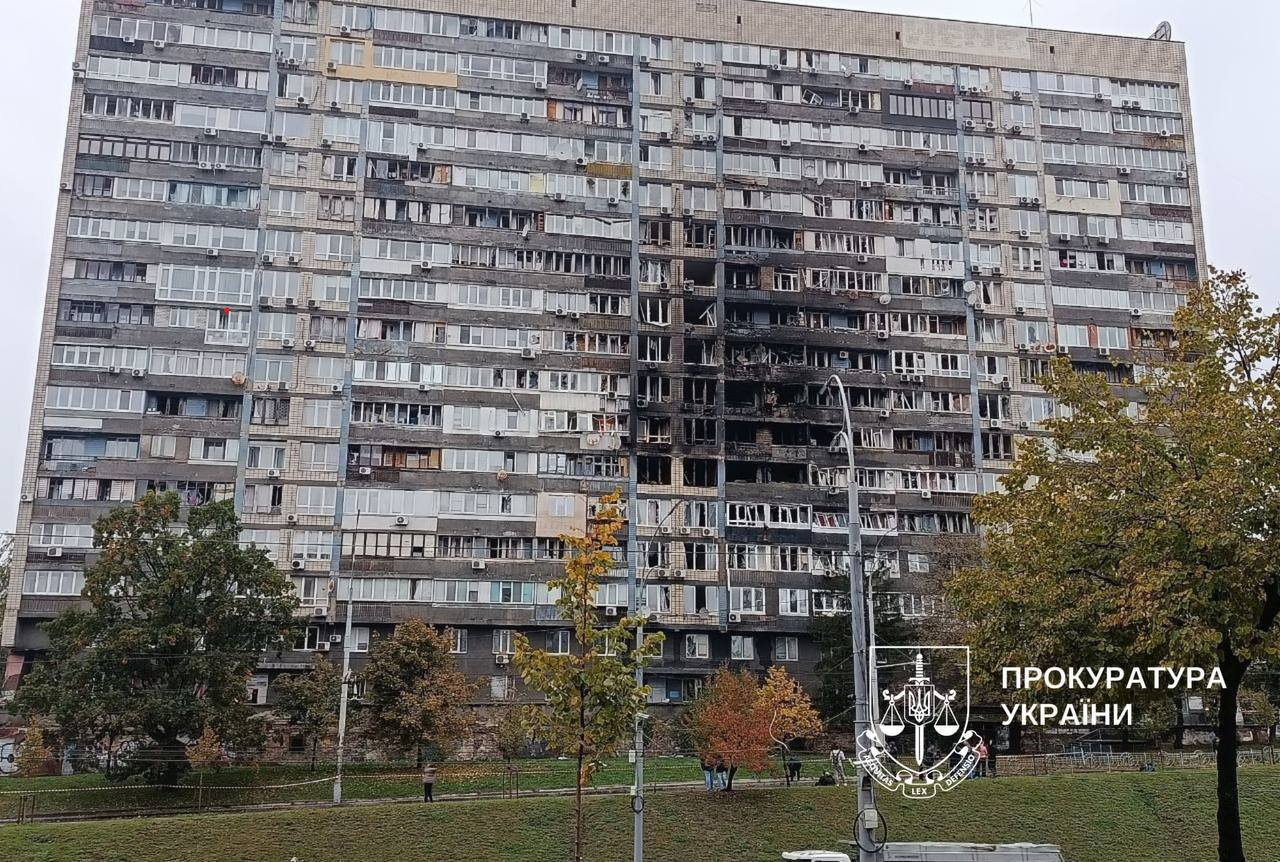
Damage to a residential building in Kyiv following Russian air strikes on 10 October 2025

One person was killed in a Russian missile attack on Zaporizhzhia.

Russia claimed to have shot down the first two Flamingo missiles using a Buk missile launcher, without confirmation from Ukraine that it is the first use of Flamingo missiles on Russian soil.

Three Nebo-M radars were destroyed by Ukrainian naval drones in Crimea.

Russian milbloggers claimed Russian forces retook the town of Boikivka near Dobropillia.

=== 11 October ===
In Volgograd, drone strikes resulted in five to seven explosions. Flights were suspended at Volgograd Airport. Andrey Bocharov, governor of Volgograd Oblast, said that windows in three apartment blocks were damaged, along with a school and a kindergarten. One person was injured. Ukrainian missiles struck the Luch Thermal Power Plant in Belgorod, causing "brief rolling power outages".

The Bashneft-UNPZ oil refinery in Bashkortostan was struck by SBU drones, some 1,400 kilometers from Ukraine, causing an explosion of the "crude oil processing unit".

Russian milbloggers claimed Russian forces took the town of Kozatske near Myrnohrad.

=== 12 October ===
The Ukrainian military claimed to have retaken the villages of Mali Shcherbaky in Zaporizhzhia Oblast, and Shcherbaky, west of Orikhiv.

An aviation plant in Smolensk was struck by Ukrainian drones. Locals reported multiple explosions and air defence was activated. The plant manufactured components for Kh-69 and Kh-101 missiles.

Atesh partisans attacked a railway junction in Novocherkassk, Rostov Oblast. A power substation in the village of Vygonichi, Bryansk Oblast, was also attacked. Locals reported explosions and a missile alert was declared.

Russian milbloggers claimed Russian forces took the town of Balahan near Myrnohrad, and the Pokrovsk Railway Station.

Two people were killed and one was injured after a Russian strike in Synelnykove Raion, Dnipropetrovsk Oblast.

=== 13 October ===
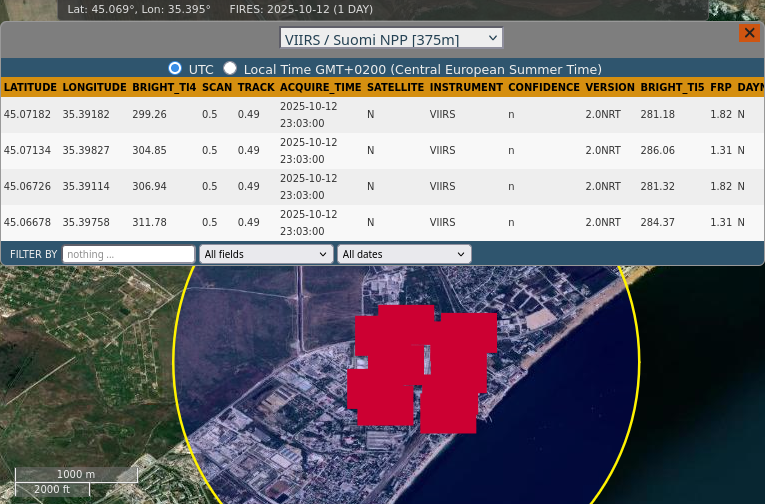
NASA's FIRMS detected fires on 12 October 2025 23:03:00 (UTC) at the Feodosia oil depot.

The head of the Republic of Crimea claimed an oil depot in Feodosia was set on fire following a drone attack. Five fuel tanks were struck as well as several power substations that were part of the "Russia-Crimea energy bridge", the substations located in Simferopol and Feodosia.

The Russian defense ministry claimed Russian forces took the town of Borivska Andriyivka, near Borova. Ukrainian military observer Kostyantyn Mashovets claimed Russian forces took the town of Dorozhnie, southeast of Dobropillia. Russian milbloggers claimed Russian forces took the town of Molodetske, southwest of Pokrovsk and advanced in southern Novopavlivka, south of Pokrovsk, while the Russian defense ministry claimed Russian forces entered eastern Myrnohrad.

=== 14 October ===
An UNOCHA aid convoy was hit by a combined Russian drone and artillery strike near Bilozerka, Kherson Oblast, destroying one truck and damaging another.

The governor of Kursk Oblast claimed one person was killed in a Ukrainian drone strike on the village of Belitsa.

Ukrainian drones struck a power substation in Arzamasskaya, Nizhny Novgorod Oblast. NASA FIRMS reported a fire which disabled two transformers leading to "short power outages", according to the local governor.

President Zelenskyy signed a decree stripping several Ukrainians of their citizenship, including Odesa Mayor Gennadiy Trukhanov, former Platform for Life and Peace MP Oleg Tsaryov and ballet dancer Sergei Polunin, all of whom held Russian citizenship. Trukhanov denies the allegations and will challenge the decree in court. Trukhanov was later replaced by Serhiy Lysak as the head of the city military administration.

Russian milbloggers claimed Russian forces took the towns of Balahan near Pokrovsk, and Sichneve, east of Velykomykhailivka.

Ukrainian authorities ordered the evacuation of children and their guardians from 40 settlements in Kupiansk Raion due to increased Russian attacks.

=== 15 October ===
The Volgograd refinery was struck by Ukrainian drones, locals reported explosions and fires.

Geolocated footage showed Russian forces took the town of Oleksiivka, southwest of Velykomykhailivka. Russian millbloggers claimed Russian forces took Karantynnyy Island, southwest of Kherson, while the Russian defense ministry claimed Russian forces took the town of Novopavlivka, south of Pokrovsk.

=== 16 October ===
Ukrainian drones struck Engels and Saratov according to locals, who reported explosions and a fire at an oil refinery in Saratov. Volgograd and Voronezh both reported power interruptions. An electrical substation in Novonikolayevka was set on fire according to Volgograd Governor Andrey Bocharov. Voronezh Governor Aleksandr Gusev also reported "several settlements" were without power due to drone attacks "in a neighboring region." Saratov Gagarin Airport suspended operations. Ukrainian drones also attacked the Kstovo oil refinery in Nizhny Novgorod Oblast. Drones flying towards the processing unit were filmed by locals while Lukoil confirmed the refinery would have to temporarily suspend operations "due to the incident."

A Ukrainian training ground under Operational Command South was struck with "two ballistic missiles", resulting in an unspecified number of casualties.

A Russian drone struck Nikopol in Dnipropetrovsk Oblast, killing one person and injuring four people. Russian drones also hit the Pokrovske settlement hromada, killing another person.

Russian journalist and RIA Novosti correspondent Ivan Zuev was killed in a Ukrainian drone strike in Russian-occupied Zaporizhzhia Oblast that also injured another Russian journalist.

Geolocated footage showed continued Ukrainian presence in Petropavlivka, a sector Russia claimed it fully controlled. Geolocated footage also showed the Russian capture of Verbove village, southwest of Velykomykhailivka; and Russian advances north of Poltavka, Huliaipole Raion.

=== 17 October ===
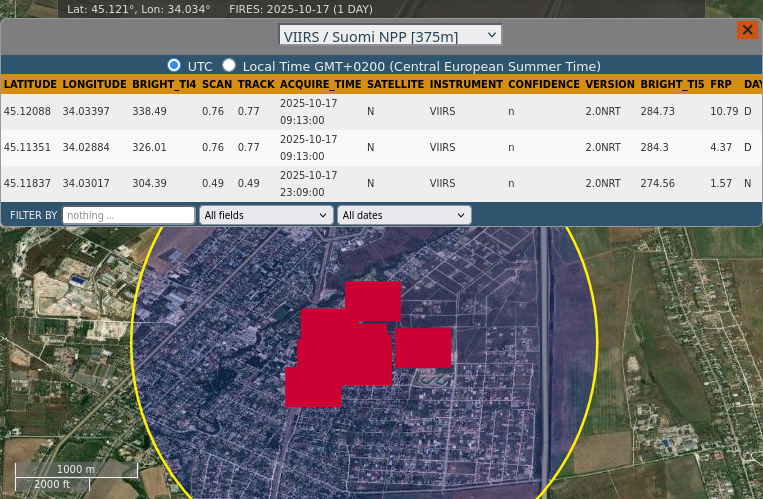
NASA's FIRMS detected fires on 17 October 2025 09:13:00 (UTC) at the Gvardeyskoye oil depot.

Ukrainian drones were reported over Sochi, resulting in the suspension of flights from ten airports. The city's mayor claimed a missile and drone attack were repelled by air defences. An ammunition dump in Donetsk was also attacked. Ukrainian Navy spokesperson Dmytro Pletenchuk claimed Russian air defences shot down an Su-30SM over Crimea "while attempting to intercept Ukrainian drones". The Avangard plant chemical factory in Sterlitamak was struck by drones. The plant specializes in "manufacturing specialized products under the state defense order." Explosions were reported in workshops at the plant. The attack killed three people and injured five more.

In Donetsk Oblast, Ukrainian military observer Kostantyn Mashovets claimed Russian forces took the town of Shandryholove, northwest of Lyman. Near Velykomykhailiavka, Mashovets claimed Ukrainian forces retook the villages of Sosnivka, Novoselivka and Khoroshe, while the Russian defense ministry claimed Russian forces took the villages of Pryvillya in Dnipropetrovsk Oblast, and Pishchane and Tykhe in Kharkiv Oblast. Geolocated footage confirmed Russian control over Pishchane a day later.

A Russian court-martial sentenced 15 Ukrainian POWs from the Aidar Battalion to up to 21 years' imprisonment on charges of terrorism.

An oil depot in Hvardiiske, Simferopol Raion near Gvardeyskoye air base was attacked and set on fire by drones.

Russian lieutenant Vasily Marzoyev, the son of General Arkady Marzoev, commander of the 18th Combined Arms Army, "was killed while carrying out a combat mission" in Ukraine. A commander of a reconnaissance platoon of the 108th Guards Kuban Cossack Air Assault Regiment, he was posthumously made a Hero of Russia.

=== 18 October ===
Ukrainian drones struck the Veshkayma substation in Ulyanovsk Oblast. Local authorities confirmed the strike by four drones, two of which exploded causing a fire. Power was out for several hours in the area. Ukrainian officials claimed the substation was a link in the electrical infrastructure between Syzean and Zhiguli hydroelectric power plants.

Two people were killed by a Ukrainian drone strike in Russian-occupied Kherson Oblast, according to the Russian-appointed governor Vladimir Saldo.

The Russian defense ministry claimed Russian forces took the town of Pleshchiivka, near Kostiantynivka.

=== 19 October ===
Ukrainian drones struck the Orenburg gas processing plant, damaging it but causing no casualties according to plant management. Yevgeny Solntsev, the local governor, reported a fire. It is the first attack on Orenburg by Ukraine. The governor of Samara Oblast also reported a drone attack that interrupted flights and internet access.

Geolocated footage showed Russian forces took the town of Poltavka, near Huliaipole.

In Dnipropetrovsk Oblast. around 192 miners had to be evacuated from an underground DTEK coal mine that suffered a Russian drone strike.

=== 20 October ===
Russian forces struck an energy facility in Chernihiv Oblast, leaving the northern part of the Oblast and the city of Slavutych, Kyiv Oblast, without electricity.

Head of the Donetsk People's Republic, Denis Pushilin, claimed Russian forces entered Kostyantynivka.

On the Dobropillia front, Russian milbloggers claimed Russian forces took Shakhove and entered Novyi Donbas.

=== 21 October ===
Four people were killed in a Russian drone attack in Novhorod-Siverskyi, Chernihiv Oblast.

Ukrainian drones were reported to have struck a residential building in Bataysk, Rostov Oblast, damaging a wall resulting in the evacuation of 20 residents according to the local governor. Windows in nearby homes were also damaged by drone debris. A cut power line left 3,000 customers without power. In Rostov-on-Don a minor was hospitalised with "shrapnel wounds". In Bryansk Oblast the governor also claimed a minor was injured by drone debris. In Voronezh Oblast the local governor reported an "industrial enterprise" and private property was damaged. The Bryansk Chemical plant was struck by Storm Shadow missiles. Ukrainian intelligence said explosives destroyed a section of the railway between Pskov and St. Petersburg, claiming this would delay Russian logistics.

The SBU claimed to have carried out an attack that destroyed two Russian light drone-interceptor aircraft in Russian-occupied airfields in Ukraine.

Geolocated footage showed Russian forces re-entered the town of Mala Tokmachka and took the center of the town. Russian millbloggers claimed Russian forces took the entire town, and also Shcherbaky and Mali Shcherbaky, west of Orikhiv.

=== 22 October ===
Russia launched a massive air attack on Ukraine, killing two people in Kyiv and four others in Brovary Raion, Kyiv Oblast. One person was killed in a separate attack in Kharkiv.

The Makhachkala Oil Refinery in Dagestan was struck by Ukrainian forces along with the Saransk Mechanical Plant in Mordovia, with locals reporting explosions. Commander of the Unmanned Systems Forces, Robert Brovdi, said the explosion at the Saransk Mechanical Plant was "over an area of 6,500 m^{2} (70,000 sq ft)."

The HUR claimed to have killed three Russian paratroopers in Stavropol following a suspected bomb attack.

US President Trump approved sanctions against both Rosneft and Lukoil, Russia's biggest oil companies.

Geolocated footage showed Ukrainian forces retook the town of Kucheriv Yar, northeast of Dobropillia. The Russian defense ministry claimed Russian forces took the town of Pavlivka, northeast of Huliaipole.

=== 23 October ===
Ukrainian journalist Olena Hramova and cameraman Yevhen Karmazin, who both worked for Freedom TV, were killed by a Russian Lancet drone strike in Kramatorsk. One person was killed in a separate attack in Zelenyi Hai, Kharkiv Oblast.

Ukrainian drones struck the Plastmass munitions plant in Kopeysk, Chelyabinsk Oblast, leaving 12 employees missing, 10 dead and 19 injured with five being hospitalised, according to the regional governor. Two civilians were also claimed to have been killed in Bryansk and Belgorod Oblasts. The Ryazan oil refinery was also struck by falling debris according to the local governor.

The remains of 1,000 Ukrainian soldiers killed in action were repatriated by Russia.

A Czech fundraising initiative, Darek pro Putina (A Gift for Putin), raised $520,000 in 48 hours to buy Ukraine a Flamingo cruise missile.

In Kazakhstan, wreckage from a drone explosion was found in Borili District of West Kazakhstan Region, bordering Russia's Orenburg Oblast. One drone fragment had "Ukrainian-language markings" on it. No damage or casualties were reported, but the Kazakhstan government launched an investigation.

Ukrainian forces executed a mechanized assault near Kupiansk and retook Myrove and Holubivka. Geolocated footage showed Russian advances west of Vyimka, southeast of Siversk; and west of Dvorichna.

=== 24 October ===
Three people were killed by Russian shelling and drone attacks in Kherson.

A Ukrainian drone struck an apartment building in Krasnogorsk, Moscow Oblast, injuring five people. The Russian MoD claimed to have intercepted 111 Ukrainian drones over 13 regions.

The Russian defense ministry claimed Russian forces took the towns of Bolohivka in Kharkiv Oblast near the international border, Dronivka northwest of Siversk, and Zlahoda near Velykomykhailivka. Russian millbloggers claimed Russian forces took the towns of Vilne and Ivanivka east of Dobropillia. A Russian milblogger claimed Ukrainian forces retook Tyshchenkivka, northwest of Kupiansk and a Ukrainian news outlet claimed Russian forces took the town of Krasnyi Lyman, near Pokrovsk.

=== 25 October ===
Andrey Bocharov, governor of Volgograd Oblast, said the Balashovskaya electrical substation, in the Novonikolayevsky District, was set on fire after a "massive" drone attack. The Governor of Belgorod Oblast, Vyacheslav Gladkov, claimed Ukraine struck the Belgorod Reservoir dam with HIMARS rockets damaging "several buildings with technical equipment, and lifting mechanisms of one discharge lock". One Russian National Guard and a civilian were wounded. According to Ukrainian officials the dam was damaged to impede Russian logistics near Vovchansk.

Geolocated footage showed Ukrainian forces retook the town of Sukhetske, northeast of Pokrovsk.

Russian OMON commander Lieutenant Colonel Veniamin Mazzherin was killed by a car bomb, according to the HUR, in Kemerovo Oblast. His unit was accused of war crimes in Kyiv Oblast in 2022.

=== 26 October ===
Three people were killed in a Russian airstrike on Kyiv.

A Russian train was derailed by partisans using explosives in Berdiansk Raion, Zaporizhzhia Oblast. One locomotive, three railway platforms and at least nine freight cars were damaged according to HUR.

On the Sumy front, Russian millbloggers claimed Russian forces took the town of Oleksiivka and on the Kupiansk front, Russian forces took the towns of Radkivka and Kurylivka.

=== 27 October ===
Ukrainian drones targeted Moscow, with the city's mayor Sergey Sobyanin reporting 34 drones shot down. Domodedovo and Zhukovsky airports were temporarily closed. On Russian Telegram channels explosions were reported across Moscow including the Kommunarka district. An oil refinery in Serpukhov was reported on fire by the Astra news agency, "citing eyewitness footage". Russian milbloggers released footage of what they claimed was a Flamingo missile flying over Russian territory.

Near Velykomykhailivka, geolocated footage showed Ukrainian forces retook the town of Yehorivka, while near Huliaipole, geolocated footage showed Russian forces took the towns of Pryvilne and Novomykolaivka.

=== 28 October ===
Ukrainian forces captured a Russian Bactrian camel in the east of the country.

Geolocated footage showed Russian advances in central Predetcyhne, east of Kostyantynivka; and Russian advances and retreat in southeast Kostyantynivka.

=== 29 October ===
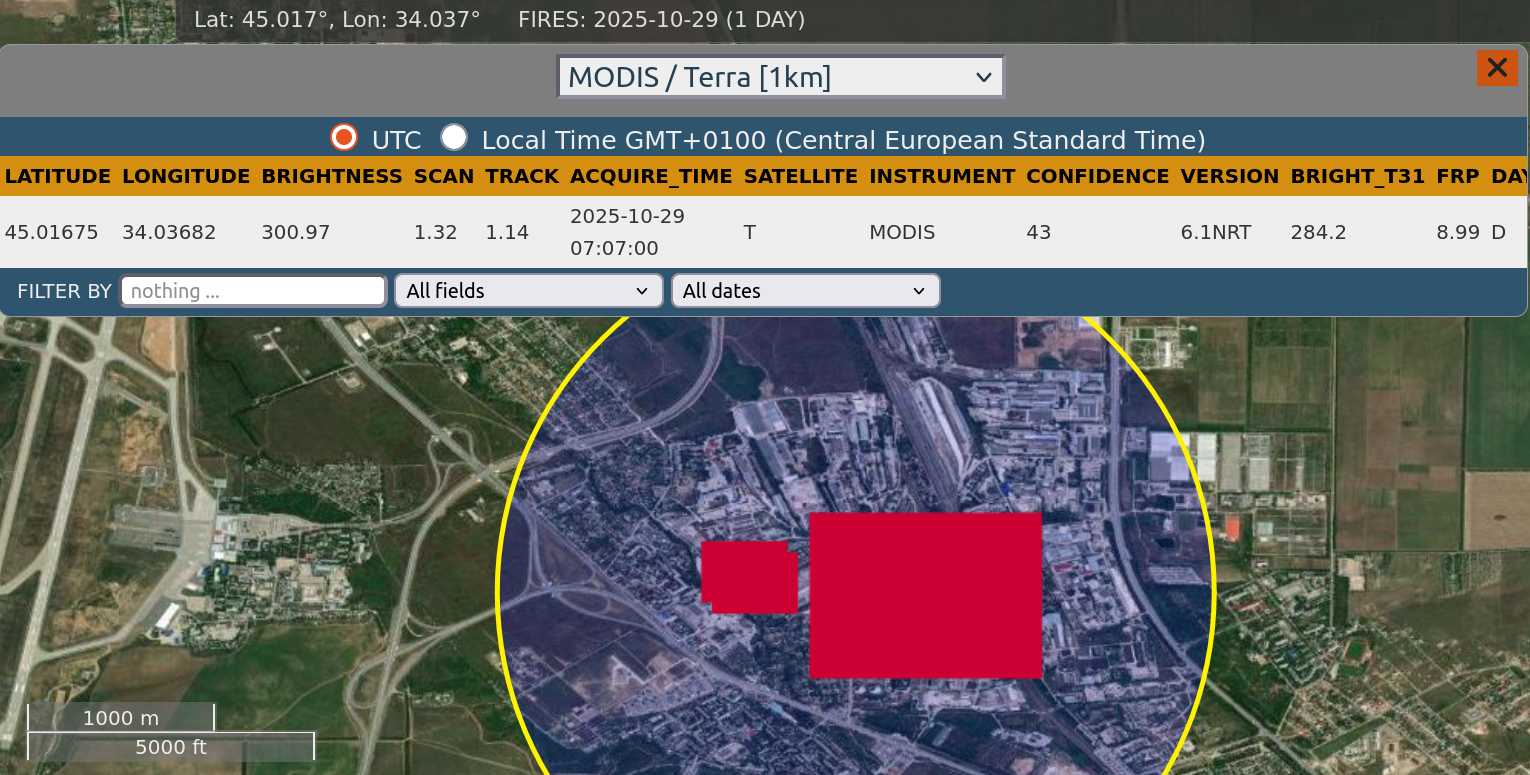
NASA's FIRMS detected fire on 29 October 2025 07:07:00 (UTC) at the ATAN oil depot east of Simferopol International Airport.

According to Telegram channel Astra, Ukrainian drones attacked the NS-Oil refinery in Novospasskoye, Ulyanovsk Oblast. The Stavrolen petrochemical plant in Budyonnovsk, Stavropol Oblast was also hit. However, according to the local governor, the drones "did not cause significant damage". Witnesses in Orshanka and Mari El reported explosions and a "fireball".

The ATAN oil depot east of Simferopol International Airport was attacked by drones and caught fire.

Russian forces launched airstrikes on cities in Kherson Oblast, particularly Antonivka, Komyshany, Prydniprovske, Sadove, Chornobaivka, Bilozerka, Beryslav and Kherson, injuring 12 people including two children. Two people were killed and seven were injured during airstrikes in Druzhkivka and Kryvorizhzhia. A man was killed by airstrikes in Yunakivka rural hromada, Sumy Oblast. Two people were injured by Russian strikes in the village of Pisky-Radkivski in Kharkiv Oblast.

Near Velykomykhailiavka, Russian millbloggers claimed Russian forces took the town of Vyshneve and the Russian defense ministry claimed Russian forces took the town of Yehorivka.

The SBU said Ukrainian drones struck a Pantsir missile system and radar stations in Crimea.

=== 30 October ===
A crowd of civilians attacked a recruitment center of the Ukrainian Armed Forces in Odesa using tear gas and batons, injuring numerous soldiers. According to the Odesa Oblast Territorial Recruitment Center, the incident was "a direct attack and an attempt to forcibly obstruct legal mobilization measures."

In Kremenchuk, Poltava Oblast, two Ukrainian soldiers working at a draft office were shot and injured by an unidentified man wielding a Tokarev pistol.

Geolocated footage showed Russian advances south of Vyimka near Siversk, across Donets Railway lines in Pokrovsk, and in central Krasnohirske near Huliaipole.

=== 31 October ===
SBU chief Vasyl Malyuk claimed the HUR, SBU and the Ukrainian military destroyed a Russian Oreshnik missile system on an unspecified date at the Kapustin Yar testing site, leaving two operational. Neptune missiles struck the Oryol thermal power plant resulting in a power outage. Neptune missiles also struck the Novobryansk substation, near Bryansk. Drones attacked the electrical substation in Vladimir and the Yaroslavl refinery was also attacked by drones. Zhukovsky in Moscow Oblast lost power after a drone attack. Some locals in Belgorod reported up to 700 drones, on Telegram, the "largest ever" swarm of Ukrainian drones.

Former Odesa City Council member Valentyn Chernov was detained by Ukrainian authorities on suspicion of "treason and encroaching on the territorial integrity and inviolability of Ukraine".

The HUR claimed to have blown up a section of the Koltsevoy pipeline in Moscow Oblast and "reportedly destroyed all three major fuel lines".

The HUR claimed to have inserted commandoes, by helicopter, into Russian controlled areas of Pokrovsk. On 1 November, the Russian MoD claimed the "11 personnel who landed from the helicopter were killed".

Ukrainian military observer Kostyantyn Mashovets claimed Russian forces took the town of Volodymyrivka, southwest of Druzhkivka. The Russian defense ministry claimed Russian forces took the town of Novooleskandrivka, southwest of Velykomykhailivka.

== November 2025 ==
=== 1 November ===
The Russian MoD claimed to have destroyed 98 drones over 10 regions. Drones struck a power substation in Alchevsk, Luhansk Oblast, resulting in a power outage. A power substation in Zheleznogorsk, Kursk Oblast, was also struck by drones leaving part of the city in darkness.

A missile strike on a military base in Dnipropetrovsk Oblast hit an awards ceremony organised by the 35th Marine Brigade (Ukraine), killing eight and wounding 40, including experienced drone pilots and soldiers.

Geolocated footage showed Russian advances in northern Ambarne near Velykyi Burluk.

=== 2 November ===
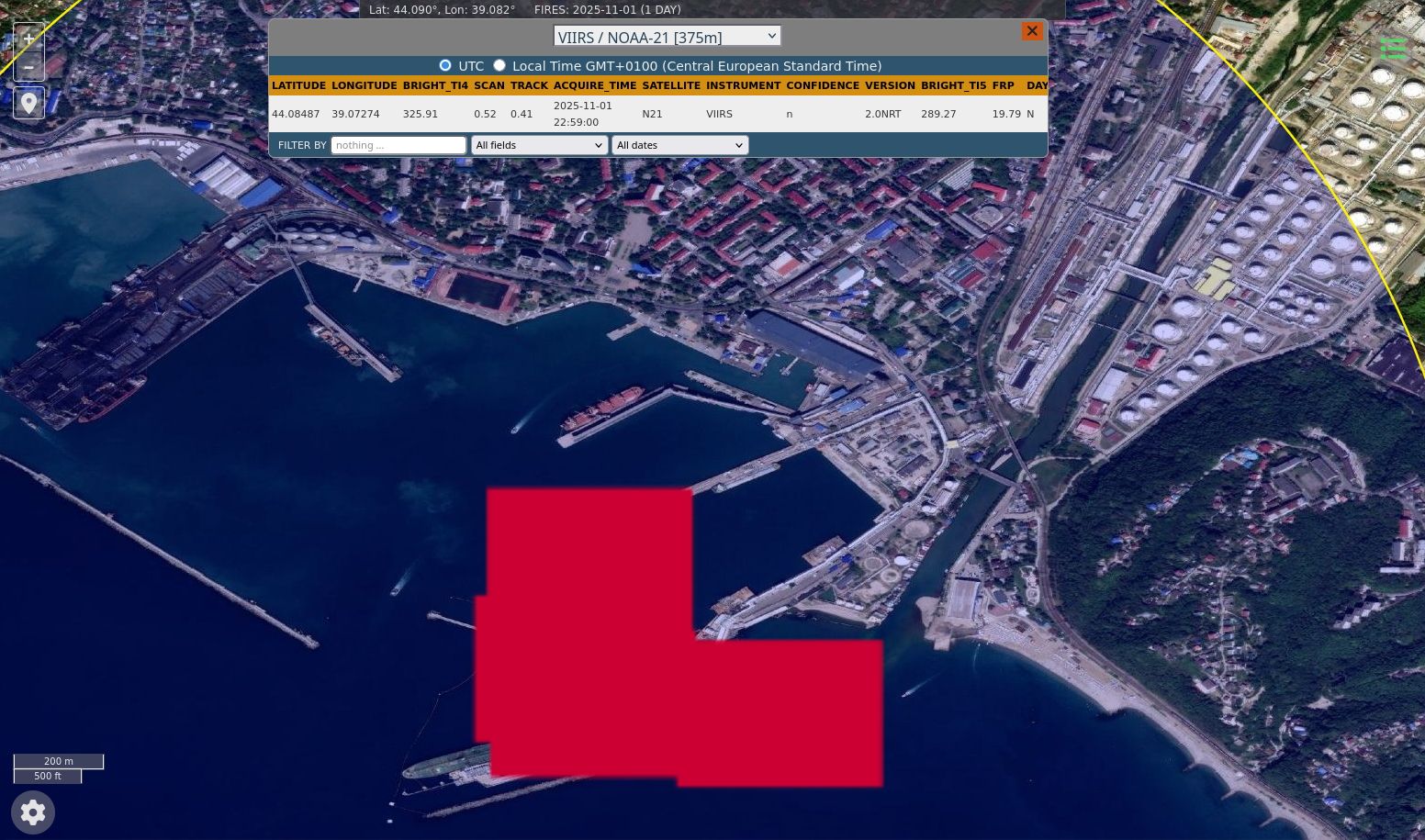
NASA's FIRMS detected fire on 1 November 2025 22:59:00 (UTC) at the Tuapse oil terminal in Tuapse, Krasnodar Krai

Six people were killed in Russian airstrikes on Dnipropetrovsk and Odesa Oblasts.

In Krasnodar Krai, the Tuapse oil terminal serving the Tuapse Refinery was attacked by drones. The oil-loading infrastructure and an oil tanker moored at the deep-water berth caught fire and the tanker's crew was evacuated. The Kyiv Post cited a SBU source for a claim that five drones hits were recorded, setting fire to four oil tanker loading stands and a tanker ship.

President Zelenskyy announced the delivery of an unspecified number of Patriot batteries from Germany.

Russian milbloggers claimed Russian forces advanced in northeastern, central, and southern Pokrovsk; in northern and southeastern Myrnohrad; and south of Hnativka and Rih. A Russian milblogger reported Ukrainian forces retook areas north of Zatyshok, northeast of Pokrovsk.

=== 3 November ===
Two people were killed in a Russian drone strike near Kruhliakivka in Kharkiv Oblast.

Explosions were reported at an oil refinery in Saratov and in Engels according to Russian Telegram channel SHOT. The attack on the Saratov refinery was foiled by an anti-drone net installed over the "pentane-hexane isomerization unit". A fire also broke out near the AVT-6 unit. The oil refinery in Shakhtarsk was also attacked by drones and partially set on fire.

Britain gave Ukraine an unspecified number of Storm Shadow missiles, the first confirmed delivery since April 2025.

Geolocated footage showed Russian advances in east Vasiukivka near Siversk.

=== 4 November ===
Ukrainian drones attacked an ammunition dump in Sverdlovsk, Luhansk Oblast. An electrical substation in Volgograd Oblast was damaged by falling debris according to the local governor. Explosions were reported by media outlet ASTRA in Lipetsk. An oil refinery in Kstovo, in Nizhny Novgorod Oblast, was reported to be on fire. A petrochemical plant in Bashkortostan was attacked. Ukrainian drones struck the Russian Rubicon UAV unit command centre in Avdiivka using FP-2 drones, killing "multiple Russian officers and drone operators" according to the HUR. The Ukrainian Special Operations Forces also claimed to have destroyed a transport-loading vehicle for Iskander missiles and a 1L122 "Harmony" radar station in Ovsyannikovo, Kursky District, Kursk Oblast with the help of the Russian partisan movement Chornaya Iskra.

Geolocated footage showed Russian advances in south Lukashivka near Sumy; and Ukrainian advances south of Predtechyne and Oleksandro-Shultyne.

=== 5 November ===
The Ukrainian military claimed to have carried out an attack on Donetsk International Airport that destroyed a logistics hub for Russian drones.

The Oryol thermal power plant was struck by either "missiles or jet-powered drones" according to locals, which resulted in "powerful explosions". An electrical substation in Vladimir was also attacked. One person was killed in a separate attack in Volgograd Oblast, according to the regional governor. Drones struck the Volgograd oil refinery with explosions and fires being "recorded" at the site. Oil infrastructure in Hvardiiske and Simferopol, both in Crimea, were damaged by drones. An oil pumping station in Yaroslavl was also struck by Ukrainian drones. Yaroslavl Airport also suspended flights.

=== 6 November ===
In Volgorechensk, Kostroma Oblast, the Kostroma Power Station, the third largest power plant in Russia, was attacked by Ukrainian drones. ASTRA cited locals who reported explosions and a fire. The local governor acknowledged the attack but claimed no damage nor casualties.

Ukrainian authorities sentenced Russian rifleman Dmitry Kurashov to life imprisonment for fatally shooting a surrendering Ukrainian soldier near Pryiutne village in Polohy Raion, Zaporizhzhia Oblast on 6 January 2024. Kurashov was a member of the Storm-V assault unit of the 218th Guards Tank Regiment, 127th Motor Rifle Division, 5th Guards Combined Arms Army of the Eastern Military District.

Russian forces conducted drone strikes in Sumy Oblast, killing one person and injuring three more in the Seredyna-Buda urban hromada and injuring one person in the Nova Sloboda rural hromada.

=== 7 November ===
Geolocated footage showed Russian forces took the towns of Uspenivka and Pavlivka near Huliaipole. Russian sources claimed Russian forces took the town of Rih, near Pokrovsk. Russian millbloggers claimed Russian forces took the towns of Dorozhnie, Sukhetske and Zapovidne, north of Pokrovsk.

=== 8 November ===
Three people were killed in a Russian drone attack on Dnipro, while another was killed in a separate attack in Kharkiv. A series of Russian drone strikes damaged and shut down all three thermal power plants operated by Ukrainian energy firm Centrenergo.

The governor of Belgorod Oblast claimed Ukrainian drone strikes on a power plant left 20,000 people in Belgorod and Dubovoye without electricity. The Voronezh Oblast governor claimed Ukrainian drone strikes caused power outages in Voronezh city.

The Russian defense ministry claimed Russian forces took the town of Vovche, southwest of Velykomykhailivka.

=== 9 November ===
Three Ukrainian missiles destroyed Voronezh's Thermal Power Plant-1. Two explosions occurred at the "110/35/6 kV T-25" electrical substation in Taganrog, leaving many parts of the city without power for several hours due to a damaged high voltage line.

Geolocated footage showed Russian forces took the town of Rybne, northeast of Huliaipole.

=== 10 November ===
Ukrainian naval drones attacked Tuapse, according to ASTRA news channel a berths was "likely damaged". Locals reported explosions and a drone alert that lasted eight hours. The Russian MoD acknowledged the attack but claimed all the drones were intercepted, expect one exploding on the beach and damaging a private home but causing no casualties. An oil storage facility near the Likhovskaya railway station in Rostov Oblast was attacked by drones. Videos posted online showed fires near the oil tanks. The tanks can store "26,400 cubic meters, according to open-source data".

Geolocated footage showed Russian forces took the town of Nove near Huliaipole, while the Russian defense ministry claimed Russian forces took the towns of Solodke and Novouspenivske.

=== 11 November ===
Ukrainian Southern Defense Forces Spokesperson Colonel Vladyslav Voloshyn reported Ukrainian forces withdrew from the towns of Okhotnyche, Rivnopillia, Uspenivka, Novouspenivske and Novomykolaivka in Zaporizhzhia Oblast.

Ukrainian drones struck an oil refinery in Saratov. Footage on Telegram showed explosions and fires. The local governor, Roman Busargin, acknowledged "drones had damaged civilian infrastructure" without specifying what infrastructure or casualties. The Oil Sea Terminal in Feodosia, Crimea was struck by drones along with a storage warehouse in occupied Donetsk. The Orsk Oil Refinery in Orenburg Oblast came under drone attack with explosions and fires recorded. A drone attack was also carried out on a power station in occupied Novyi Svit, Donetsk Oblast.

=== 12 November ===
The SBU said it discovered an FSB agent from Crimea who had plotted bomb attacks in Kyiv and assassination attempts on a journalist in Kherson and a media worker with the Ukrainian military.

Drones struck a target, possibly the Stavrolen petrochemical plant, in Budyonnovsk, Stavropol Krai. The local governor reported a fire in an "industrial enterprise". Restrictions on flights from airports in Moscow, Vladikavkaz, Grozny, and Samara were enacted.

The Russian Armed Forces announced the establishment of its Unmanned Systems Forces with Sergei Ishtuganov as its Deputy Head.

The Russian defense ministry claimed Russian forces took the town of Sukhyi Yar south of Myrnohrad.

=== 13 November ===
Ukrainian FP-5 Flamingo missiles and drones struck Oryol. The local governor said several cars and apartments were damaged, while several drones were shot down by air defences. The HUR claimed to have derailed a train, carrying North Korean weapons being supplied to Russia on the Trans-Siberian Railway, near Sosnovka in Khabarovsk Krai using explosives.

The Russian defense ministry claimed Russian forces took the towns of Danylivka, southwest of Velykomykhailivka and Synelnykove, near Vovchansk.

=== 14 November ===
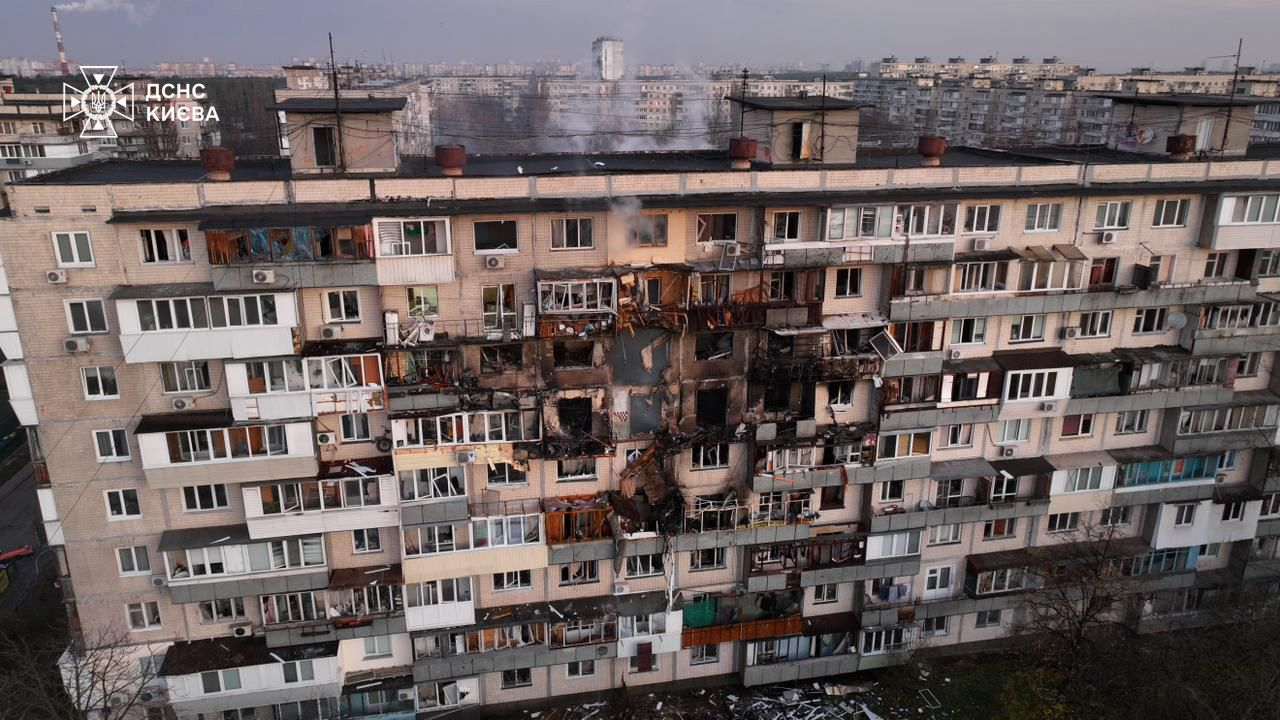
Apartment building in Kyiv after the attack

Seven people were killed in a Russian air attack on Kyiv.

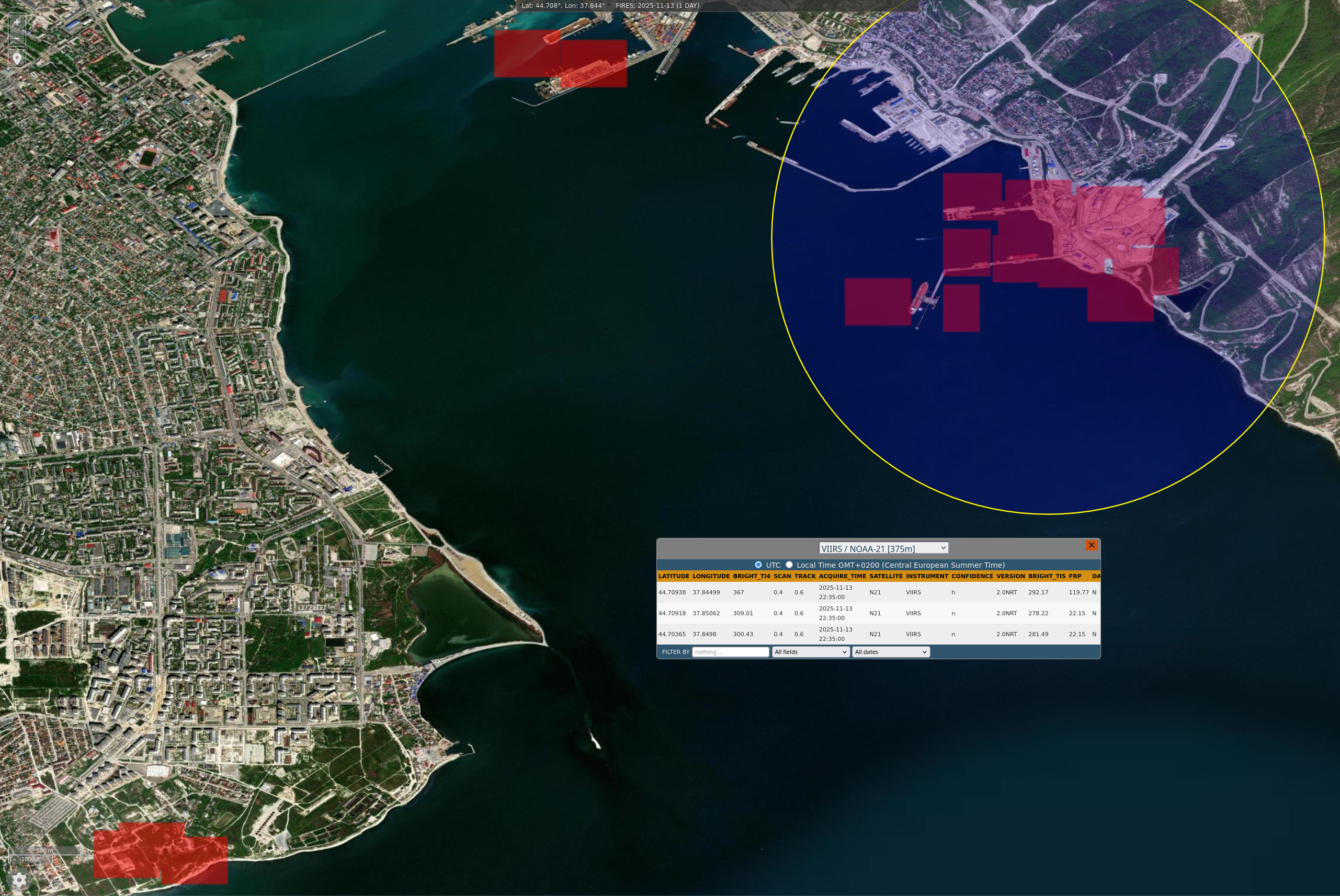
NASA's FIRMS detected fires on 13 November 2025 22:35:00 (UTC) in the Port of Novorossiysk including its oil terminal and at a air defense site

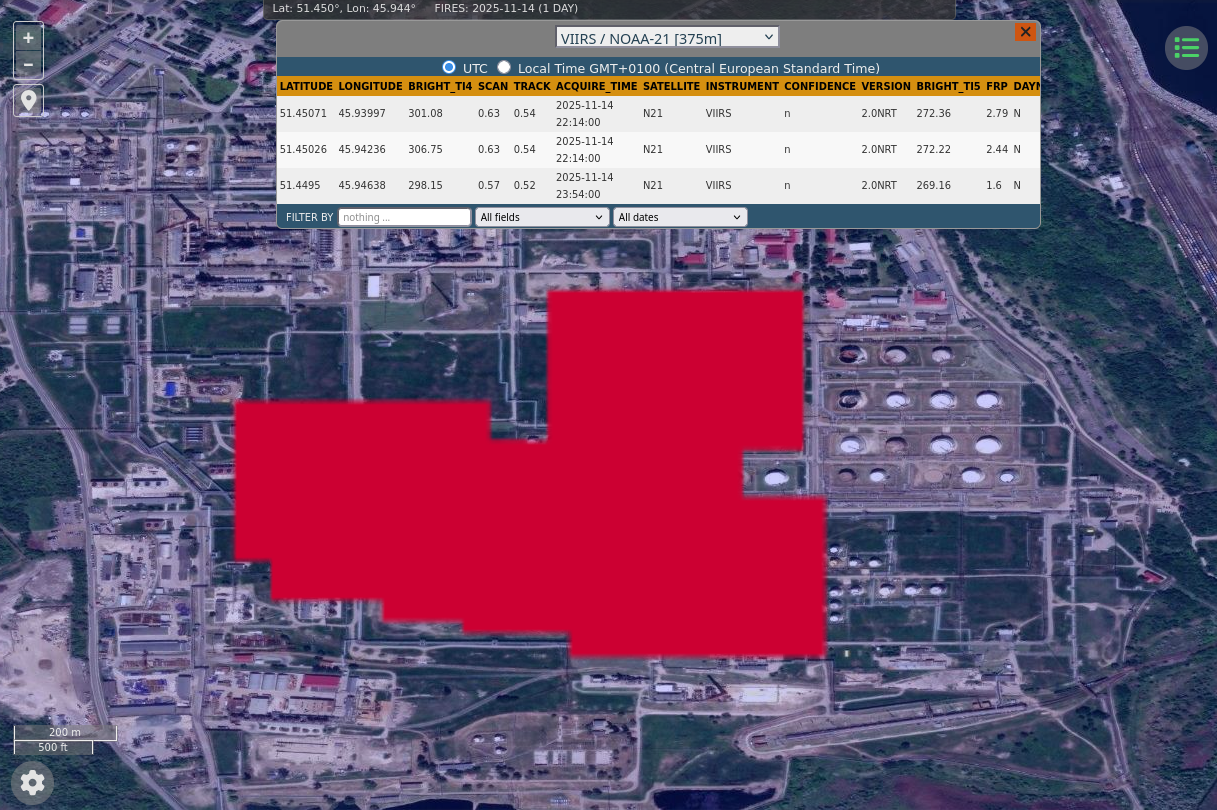
NASA's FIRMS detected fire on 14 November 2025 22:14:00 (UTC) at the oil refinery in Saratov

Ukrainian drones were reported to have attacked Saratov overnight, striking the local oil refinery. The Russian Defense Ministry claimed to have shot down 45 drones. Roman Busargin, governor of Saratov Oblast, reported damage to "civilian infrastructure". The SBU, HUR and the Ukrainian Navy launched a strike on the Port of Novorossiysk, setting fire to oil export infrastructure including pumping stations, berthed tankers and pipelines. An S-300/400 missile system was also struck. Following the attacks, the port reportedly halted oil exports.

Geolocated footage confirmed Russian control over Novotoretske in the Dobropillia front. The Russian defense ministry claimed Russian forces took the towns of Orestopil near Velykomykhailiavka, and Rih near Pokrovsk. Russian millbloggers claimed Russian forces took the towns of Sobolivka west of Kupiansk, and Shakhove east of Dobropillia.

=== 15 November ===
Ukrainian drones struck the Ryazan Oil Refinery with drones, causing explosions and a large fire. The Russian defense ministry claimed over 64 Ukrainian drones were intercepted overnight, including 25 over Ryazan Oblast.

Geolocated footage showed Russian forces took the towns of Rivnopillya and Yablukove, both northeast of Huliaipole.

=== 16 November ===
A blackout affecting 500,000 customers hit Russian-occupied Donetsk Oblast, following a reported strike on the Chaikine electric substation near Makiivka.

Atesh claimed to have carried out a sabotage attack on a section of railway near Novobohdanivka in Melitopol Raion, occupied Zaporizhzhia Oblast.

Ukrainian strikes hit the Novokuybyshevsk oil refinery in Samara Oblast, and a drone storage used by Russia's Rubikon unit and a fuel pumping station, both in Donetsk Oblast.

Geolocated footage showed Russian advances in east Zatyshshya, located east of Huliaipole.

=== 17 November ===
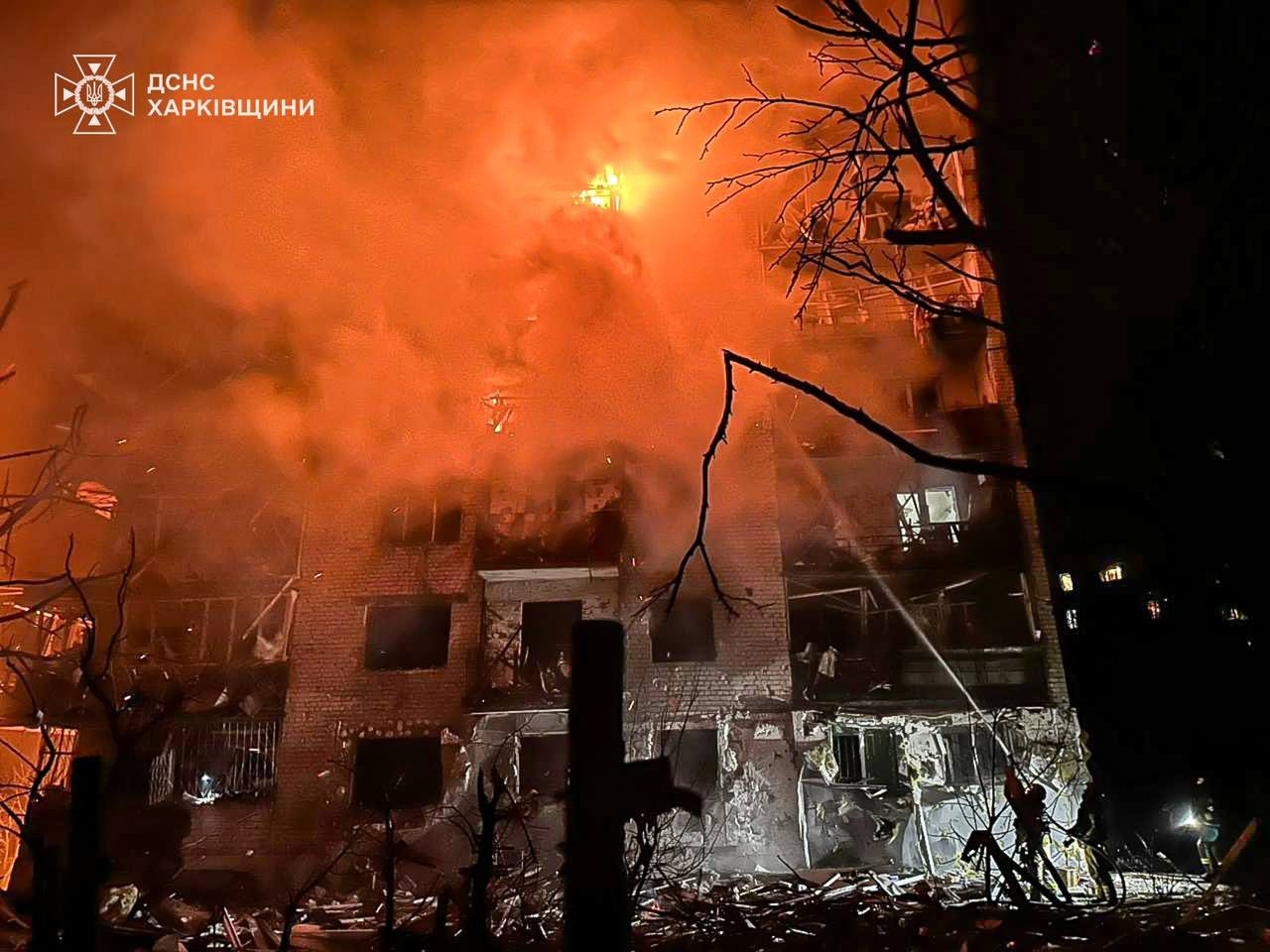
Apartment building in Balakliia after the strike

Three people were killed while 15 others were injured in a Russian missile strike in Balakliia, Kharkiv Oblast. In Dnipro, the offices of the Ukrainian public broadcaster Suspilne were heavily damaged in a Russian drone attack.

The Turkish-flagged liquefied petroleum gas tanker Orinda caught fire as it was sailing along the Danube following a Russian drone attack on Izmail, Odesa Oblast, forcing the evacuation of up to 150 residents of Plauru village in neighboring Romania.

Ukrainian drones destroyed a Buk-M3 and a 9K33 Osa missile launcher in Kherson Oblast.

The Russian defense ministry claimed Russian forces took the towns of Dvorichanske near Topoli, Platonivka northwest of Siversk, and Hai near Pokrovske. A Russian milblogger claimed Russian forces took the town of Kurylivka, southeast of Kupiansk.

=== 18 November ===
One person was killed in a Russian missile attack on Berestyn in Kharkiv Oblast.

The Ukrainian military carried out an attack on the Zuivska Thermal Power Plant in Zuhres as well as the Starobesheve Thermal Plant, both in occupied Donetsk Oblast. Ukraine used an ATACMS missile on a target in Voronezh Oblast. Drone attacks were reported over Moscow and Ryazan. Russia claimed three drones were shot down over Moscow, causing damage. Balloon drones were used in Ryazan.

The Russian defense ministry claimed Russian forces took the town of Nechaivka, south of Pokrovske, while Russian milbloggers claimed Russian forces took the town of Vesele east of Huliaipole. The capture of Vesele was confirmed by geolocation two days later.

=== 19 November ===
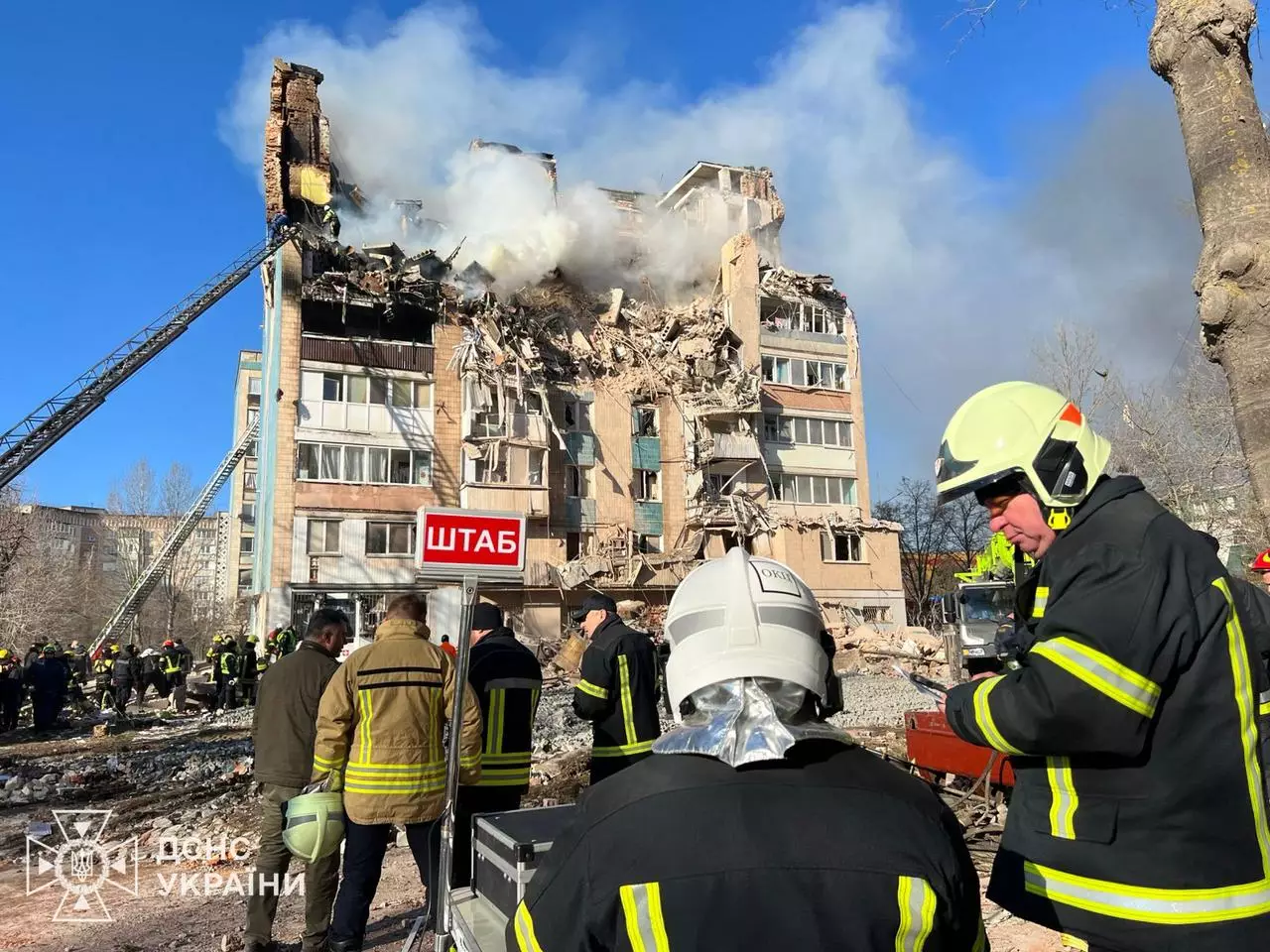
Apartment building in Ternopil after the attack

A Russian strike on two apartment buildings killed 38 people in Ternopil.

Ukrainian drone struck the Novomichurinsk State District Power Plant in Ryazan Oblast, resulting in at least seven explosions. Ryazan Oil Refinery was also attacked by drones with locals reporting explosions and fire in the grounds of the oil refinery. The Ilsky oil refinery in Krasnodar Krai was struck by drones with locals reporting "multiple explosions" at the facility.

Geolocated footage indicated Russian advances southeast of Hryshyne village near Pokrovsk.

=== 20 November ===
A Ukrainian military source reported Russian forces advanced to the Vovcha River, indicating Russian forces likely seized Andriivka-Klevtsove, northeast of Velykomykhailivka; Oleksandrohrad, Sichneve, Novoselivka, all three east of Velykomykhailivka; Khoroshe, Sosnivka, both southeast of Velykomykhailivka; Stepove, Orestopil, both south of Velykomykhailivka; Novooleksandrivka, Hai, Oleksiivka and Vovche, all of them southwest of Velykomykhailivka; Vidradne, Kyrpyche, Yehorivka, Danylivka, Radisne, and Nechaivka, all north of Hulyaipole. The Russian army claimed it had taken Kupiansk.

Five people were killed in a Russian air attack on Zaporizhzhia that injured eight others.

Russia and Ukraine conducted an exchange of war dead where the remains of 1,000 Ukrainian soldiers were repatriated in exchange for those of 30 Russian soldiers.

Electrical substations in Glushkovsky, Rylsky, and Korenevsky Districts in Kursk Oblast were destroyed by drones, leaving around 16,000 people without power.

=== 21 November ===
HUR drones destroyed a Ka-27 and a radar station in Crimea.

The Russian defense ministry claimed Russian forces took the cities and towns of Kupiansk, Petropavlivka, Novoselivka, Stavky, Yampil, Zvanivka, Nechaivka and Radisne. Russian milbloggers claimed Russian forces seized Zelenyi Hai near Huliaipole. Geolocated footage showed Russian forces took the town of Ivanopillya near Kostiantynivka.

=== 22 November ===
A Mi-8 helicopter was downed by a long range drone over Rostov Oblast, approximately 190 kilometres (120 mi) from Ukrainian lines. Syzran oil refinery was struck by Ukrainian drones. An "energy structure" in Rylsk in Kursk Oblast was struck, leaving 3,000 people without power; an electrical substation in Crimea was also attacked.

Russian millbloggers claimed Russian forces took Pokrovsk, with a Ukrainian serviceman admitting Ukrainian forces "completely" lost the city and noted Russian forces are attempting to narrow the egress route near Myrnohrad and Rivne, cutting off all logistics into Myrnohrad and leaving Ukrainian forces unable to withdraw from the remaining limited opening in the pocket.

The Russian Defense Ministry and Russian milbloggers claimed Russian forces took the towns of Nove Zaporizhzhia and Vysoke near Huliaipole. A Russian milblogger claimed Russian forces took the town of Shakhove.

=== 23 November ===
Four people were killed in a Russian drone attack on Kharkiv.

The Shatura Power Station in Moscow Oblast was struck by Ukrainian drones and set on fire. Ukrainian drones struck "substations and other energy infrastructure facilities" in Zuhres, Torez, Dokuchaievsk and Shakhtarsk, all in occupied Donetsk.

Atesh claimed to have set fire to a locomotive being used to transport Russian military cargo in Rostov-on-Don.

Russian milbloggers claimed Russian forces took the town of Bohuslavka, northeast of Borova. The Russian defense ministry claimed Russian forces took the towns of Pazeno, southwest of Siversk, and Tykhe, west of Velykomykhailivka.

=== 24 November ===
Ukrainian military commentator Kostantyn Mashovets claimed Russian forces took the town of Odradne, east of Velykyi Burluk. A Russian milblogger claimed Russian forces took the town of Mala Tokmachka, southeast of Orikhiv.

=== 25 November ===
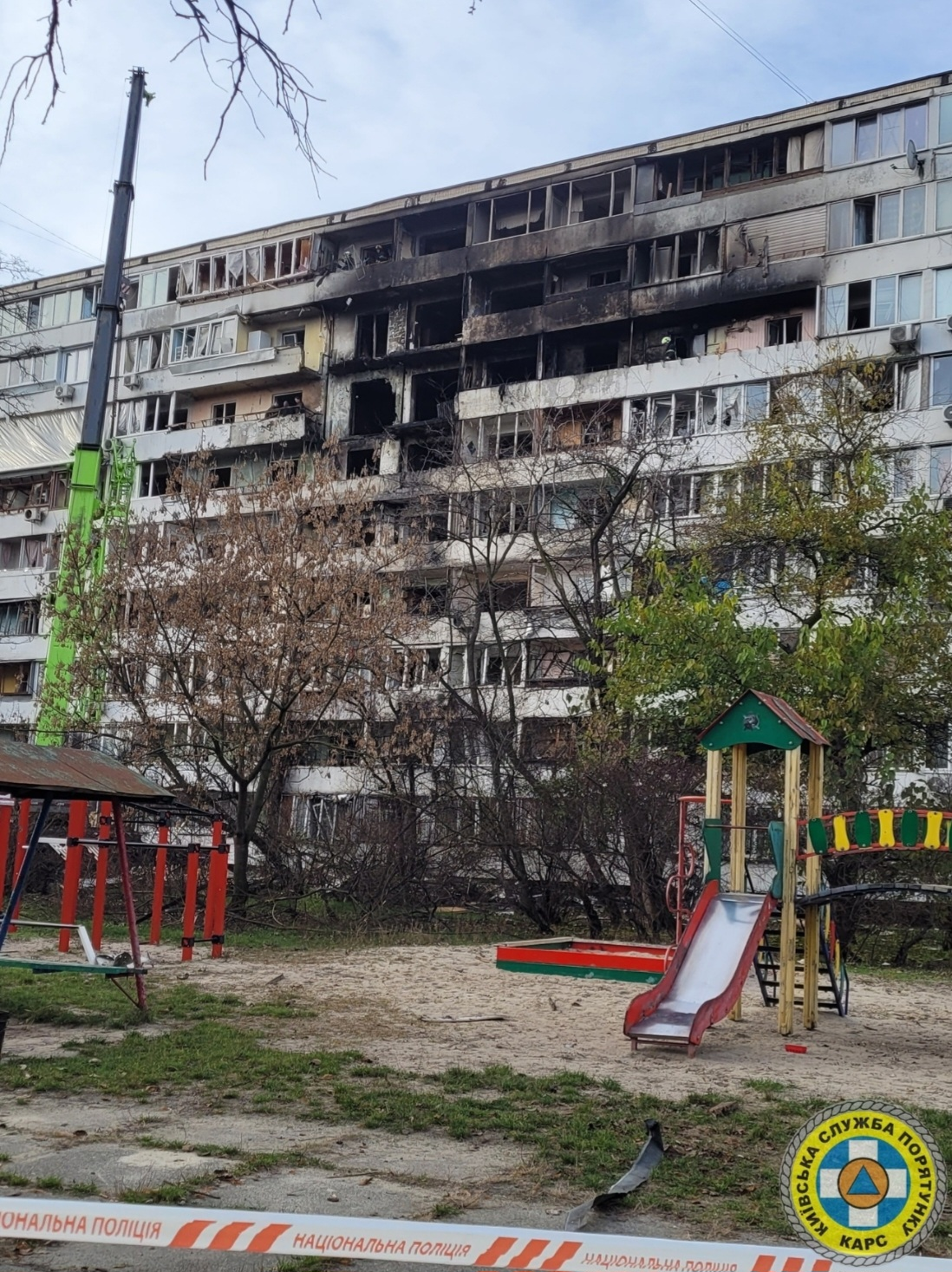
Apartment building in Kyiv after the attack

Seven people were killed in a Russian air attack on Kyiv.

A Beriev A-60 was destroyed by Ukrainian drones at a testing facility in Taganrog. The governor of Rostov Oblast claimed three people were killed in an attack on the city. The port at Novorossiysk was attacked by SBU drones, damaging a Tapir-class landing ship at dock. The Tuapse oil refinery and loading facilities were damaged, along with an S-400 launcher. Several apartment buildings were set ablaze by Pantsir air defence systems firing and drone strikes, damaging 20 homes and injuring six people.

Russian millbloggers claimed Russian forces took the town of Oleksandro-Shultyne, southeast of Kostyantynivka.

=== 26 November ===
Deep State UA reported Russian forces had taken the villages of Promin in Donetsk Oblast and Vysoke in Zaporizhzhia Oblast. A Russian milblogger claimed Russian forces took the town of Vovchansk.

Ukrainian drones struck an electronics plant in Cheboksary in Chuvashia. Local milbloggers reported an explosion and fires.

=== 27 November ===
Ukrainian drones struck the Novokuybyshevsk oil refinery in Novokuybyshevsk. Locals reported a "bright glow" over the refinery. In Chechnya, Ukrainian drones struck the Russian 42nd Guards Motor Rifle Division's Akhmat-Sever base in Grozny and 291st Motorized Rifle Regiment base in Borzoy. Explosions were reported over the compound by ASTRA. Ukrainian missiles reportedly struck the Luch Thermal Power Plant in Belgorod Oblast, cutting heat to 20 apartment buildings according to ASTRA.

The UK signed a licensing agreement for Ukrainian Octopus interceptor drones, allowing "Ukraine to produce interceptors in the UK" to be used against Shahed drones.

The Southern District Military Court in Rostov-on-Don sentenced eight people to life imprisonment on charges of carrying out the 2022 Crimean Bridge explosion.

=== 28 November ===
Ukrainian drones attacked a UAV base at the Saky airfield in Crimea, which stores Forpost and Orion drones. A fire was reported near the Saky thermal power plant, while the Yodobrom scientific and production association was attacked according to Ukrainian Telegram channel Crimean Wind. The Saratov oil refinery was also attacked, starting a fire. Ukraine claimed to have struck the Engels-2 air base with drones, with locals reporting explosions in its vicinity. Several electrical substations were destroyed by the Ukrainian Unmanned Systems Forces both in occupied Ukraine and Russia.

Turkey reported two tankers of the Russian shadow fleet were attacked off its Black Sea coast. The Virat was struck by an "unmanned vessel" leaving it with "minor damage to its starboard side above the waterline". A second tanker, the Kairos, was struck by "an external impact" resulting in an explosion and the evacuation of the 25-member crew. Ukraine claimed responsibility.

Ukrainian drones struck a factory making components for Shahed drones, located in the Alabuga Special Economic Zone in Tatarstan, causing a fire of some "1,000 square metres (11,000 sq ft)" and the evacuation of 300 people from the facility.

Geolocated footage showed Ukrainian forces sustained positions in central Kupiansk and east Kurylivka, areas Russian forces claimed they fully controlled. Geolocated footage confirmed the Russian capture of Kolodiazi village near Lyman.

=== 29 November ===
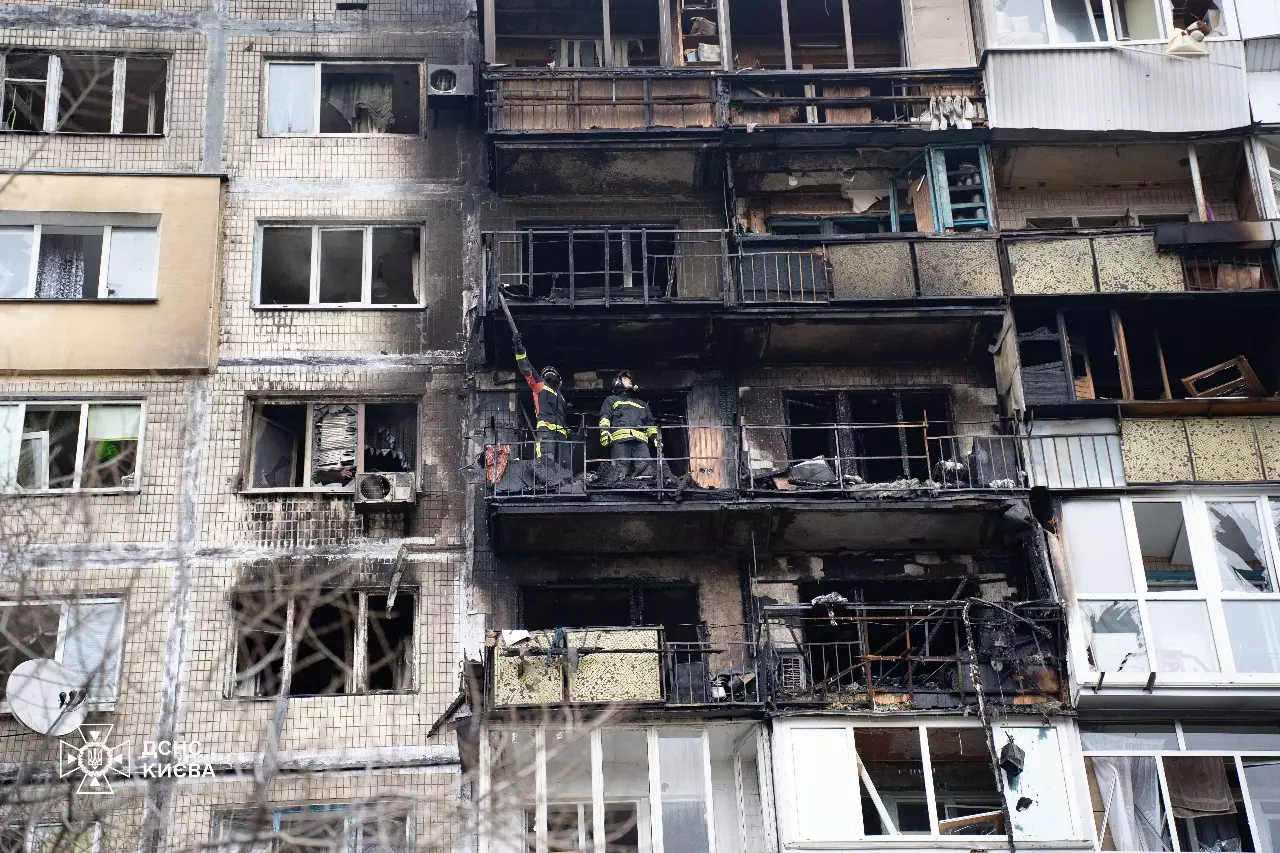
Apartment building in Kyiv after the attack

Two people were killed in a Russian air attack on Kyiv. Four others were killed in separate attacks in Dnipropetrovsk, Kherson and Kyiv Oblasts.

The Afipsky Oil Refinery in Krasnodar Krai was struck by drones. Ukrainian officials claimed explosions and a fire, while local officials confirmed a fire measuring 250 square metres (2,700 sq ft) that damaged "technical equipment". Ukrainian drones attacked Novorossiysk port, damaging one of three oil mooring ports. The Caspian Pipeline Consortium (CPC) suspended oil deliveries, partly to prevent an oil spill into the Black Sea.

A Russian milblogger claimed Russian forces took the town of Borivska Andriyivka, northeast of Borova.

The HUR used explosives to kill Kadyrovites who were illegally selling diesel fuel near Berdiansk in Zaporizhzhia Oblast.

=== 30 November ===
One person was killed in a Russian drone attack on Vyshhorod in Kyiv Oblast.

A Ukrainian interceptor drone shot down a Russian jet powered Geran-3 for the first time.

Russian authorities launched a manhunt for Sergey Yakushev, a Russian soldier recently released from Ukrainian captivity in a POW swap, who was accused of shooting dead seven fellow soldiers at a military training centre in Kamyanka, Penza Oblast, after rejoining the Russian army.

The Ukrainian 37th Marine Brigade claimed to have cleared the village of Ivanivka in Dnipropetrovsk Oblast, killing 53 Russian soldiers and capturing 19.

Ukrainian drones struck the Slavyansk oil refinery in Krasnodar Krai, damaging a gas pipeline according to ASTRA. In Novoshakhtinsk, Rostov Oblast, industrial facilities were struck according to the local governor, resulting in a fire of 50 m^{2} (540 sq ft). A boiler plant in Gukovo, also in Rostov Oblast, was damaged, cutting heat to 128 apartment buildings and infrastructure facilities. The Taganrog Aviation Scientific and Technical Complex, responsible for servicing the Beriev A-50 and Tu-95, was struck, resulting in a fire.

Atesh partisans destroyed a "military electric locomotive" in Bryansk headed for Sumy Oblast.

Ukrainian military observer Kostyantyn Mashovets claimed Ukrainian forces retook the towns of Nove Shakhove and Ivanivka, both near Dobropillia.

== December 2025 ==
=== 1 December ===
Four people were killed in a Russian missile attack on Dnipro.

The FSB claimed to have shot dead a Ukrainian national and arrested another on suspicion of plotting to assassinate a Russian military officer on behalf of the HUR following a shootout in Crimea.

Ukrainian drones tried to strike the Dagdizel machine-building plant in Kaspiysk, Dagestan. The attack appeared to have failed, with cars and buildings being damaged.

A 41-year-old "developer of guidance systems" for the Polyus Scientific Research Institute was killed by a car bomb in New Moscow, Moscow.

The Russian defense ministry claimed Russian forces took the city of Pokrovsk and Kalynove, while a Russian source claimed Ukrainian forces retook Bohuslava. Russian milbloggers claimed Russian forces seized Mayske in Donetsk Oblast.

The Ukrainian General Staff reported Russian forces took the towns of Zelenyi Hai, Vysoke and Solodke in the Huliaipole direction, and confirmed Russian control over the southern part of the Kleban-Byk Reservoir, including the towns of Shcherbynivka, Kleban-Byk and Katerynivka.

=== 2 December ===
Ukrainian drones struck several energy facilities in Oryol Oblast believed to house the Livny Combined Heat and Power Plant in Livny. The Orelnefteprodukt fuel depot was also struck according to Telegram channels. Locals in Chechnya claimed a Ukrainian drone badly damaged an FSB office.

A Russian-flagged tanker headed to the Turkish port of Sinop was attacked by a drone 80 miles (130 km) from the Turkish coast. The ship and crew were unharmed.

=== 3 December ===
Hoang Tran, a dual Czech-Vietnamese national, was sentenced to 13 years imprisonment for fighting as a foreign mercenary for Ukraine by a court in Russian-occupied Luhansk. Tran was captured in Krasnyi Lyman, north of Pokrovsk, in August 2025.

The HUR claimed responsibility for an explosion at the Taganrog-Lipetsk section of the Druzhba pipeline in Tambov Oblast.

Geolocated footage showed Russian forces took the town of Molodetske, west of Udachne. A Russian millblogger claimed Russian forces took the town of Stepnohirsk in Zaporizhzhia Oblast.

=== 4 December ===
The HUR claimed to have destroyed a Russian MiG-29 fighter aircraft at Kacha airbase in Crimea and hit an Irtysh radar system near Simferopol following drone strikes.

The Nevinnomyssk Azot chemical plant in Nevinnomyssk, Stavropol Krai was set on fire by drones. The plant is responsible for rocket fuel and explosives production. Local news agency 1777 reported residents observed at least eight drones flying near the plant and governor Vladimir Vladimirov claimed Russian air defense downed an unspecified number of drones over the city.

Geolocated footage showed Ukrainian forces retook the town of Dobropillia, north of Huliaipole.

=== 6 December ===
A Russian drone and missile strike hit a railway hub in Fastiv in Kyiv Oblast.

Geolocated footage showed Ukrainian forces retook the town of Tykhe near Velykomykhailivka.

=== 7 December ===
The dam holding the Pechenihy reservoir supplying water to Kharkiv was heavily damaged in a Russian air attack, killing one person in Staryi Saltiv.

The Russian defense ministry claimed Russian forces took the town of Kucherivka east of Kupiansk.

=== 8 December ===
Lieutenant Colonel Yevhenii Ivanov, a Ukrainian Su-27 fighter pilot, was killed during a combat mission over eastern Ukraine.

A court in occupied Donetsk sentenced four Russian soldiers to up to 12 years for the 2024 killing of American-born pro-Russian military volunteer Russell Bentley.

The Russian defense ministry claimed Russian forces took the towns of Chervone west of Chasiv Yar, Rivne east of Pokrovsk, and Novodanylivka southeast of Orikhiv. Russian milbloggers claimed Russian forces took the town of Pishchane, southeast of Kupiansk.

=== 9 December ===
Russian authorities claimed 14 people were injured in Ukrainian drone attacks in Chuvashia.

The Mayor of Moscow, Sergey Sobyanin, claimed Russian air defense shot down three drones approaching the city.

The UK Ministry of Defence announced a British soldier was killed in an accident in Ukraine while observing a weapons test behind the frontline. The soldier was later identified as 28 year old Lance Corporal George Hooley of the Parachute Regiment.

President Zelenskyy stated Ukraine was already using domestically produced Sapsan missiles in combat.

Geolocated footage indicated Russian advances south of Zarichne and west of Serednie (northwest of Lyman); in northwestern Pokrovsk and east of Rodynske. Geolocated footage indicated Ukrainian advances north of Stepove.

=== 10 December ===
Ukrainian authorities seized an African-flagged cargo vessel carrying 17 crew members in the Port of Odesa, on suspicion of illegally transporting nearly 7,000 tons of grain from Crimea to North Africa in 2021 as part of the Russian shadow fleet.

In Belgorod, the Belgorod Thermal Power Plant was damaged in a missile attack, resulting in a partial blackout. A house and cars were also damaged.

A Russian shadow fleet tanker, the Comoros-flagged Dashan, was struck by Ukrainian Sea Baby drones while travelling at high speed through Ukraine's Exclusive Economic Zone to the Russian port of Novorossiysk. Initial reports said the vessel was out of service according to the SBU.

Geolocated footage indicated Russian advances in central Ostapivske, north of Hulyaipole; and Ukrainian advances in western Pokrovsk.

=== 11 December ===
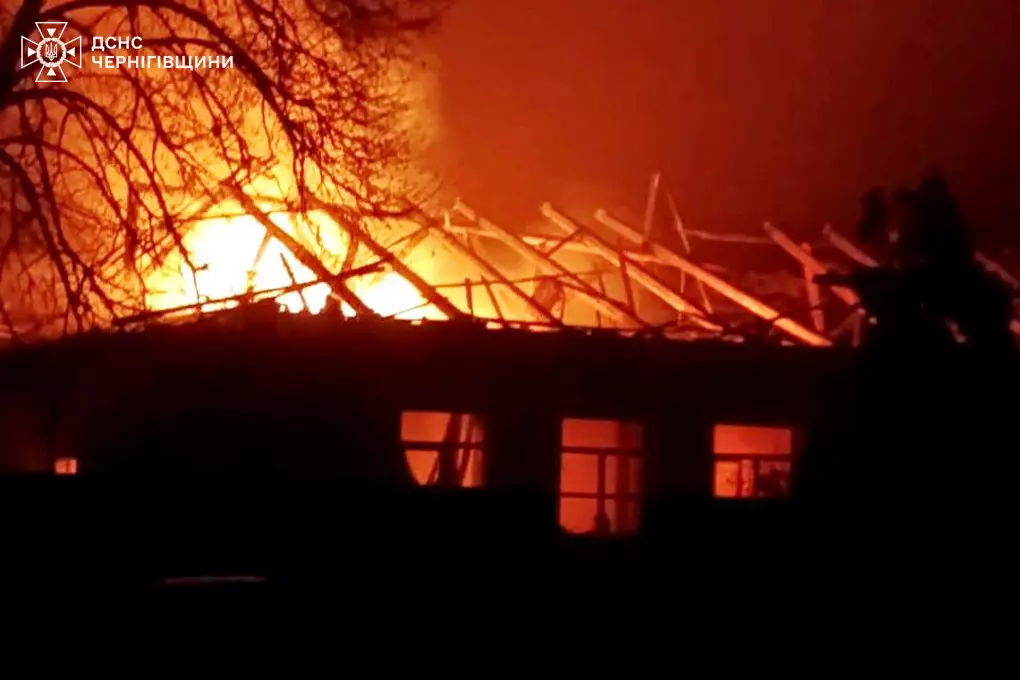
House in Nosivka (Chernihiv Oblast) after Russian drone strike

Ukraine launched a massive drone attack involving at least 287 drones across western Russia. The Filanovsky oil field operated by Lukoil in the Caspian Sea suspended operations after being hit by four drones. A Russian An-26 located at the Kacha airbase in Crimea was struck by Ukrainian drones, causing casualties. The Dorogobuzh thermal power plant in Smolensk Oblast was set on fire by Ukrainian drones. Ukrainian officials claimed the strike was aimed at stopping power to the Dorogobuzh chemical plant, which manufactures explosives. A chemical plant in Veliky Novgorod was set on fire by Ukrainian drones.

The Russian chief of the General Staff, Valery Gerasimov, claimed Russian forces took the town of Siversk.

=== 12 December ===
Russian authorities claimed seven people were injured in a Ukrainian drone attack on Tver. According to the ISW, Ukrainian forces have encircled roughly 200 Russian soldiers in Kupyansk.

Ukrainian drones struck the oil refinery in Yaroslavl; around seven explosions were reported at the facility, which is one of Russia's five largest refineries.

The Ukrainian Special Operations Forces claimed one of its units struck the Russian vessels Kompozitor Rakhmaninov and Askar-Sarydzha in the Caspian Sea with cooperation from the underground Russian movement Chornaya Iskra. SBU drones struck an oil rig that was part of the Yuri Korchagin field, the second target struck by Ukraine in the Caspian Sea.

Russian forces attacked Odesa Oblast with ballistic missiles and drones, damaging a vessel at the Port of Chornomorsk. A Russian Shahed drone struck the Turkish-owned CENK-T roll-on, roll-off cargo ship.

The Ukrainian 2nd Khartia Corps claimed to have retaken the settlements of Kindrashivka and Radkivka in Kharkiv Oblast. A Russian milblogger claimed Russian forces took the town of Oleksiivka in Sumy Oblast.

The Moscow City Court convicted International Criminal Court chief prosecutor Karim Ahmad Khan and eight ICC judges in absentia over their investigations into alleged war crimes by Russian nationals during the Russo-Ukrainian war and sentenced them to up to 15 years' imprisonment.

=== 13 December ===
Drones struck the Saratov oil refinery, causing explosions. The regional governor claimed two people were killed in a drone strike in Saratov city.

Russia launched 30 missiles and 450 drones over Ukraine, damaging 12 civilian areas and targeting energy and industrial infrastructure in Kirovohrad, Mykolaiv, Odesa, Sumy, Kharkiv, Kherson, and Chernihiv Oblasts. At least five people were injured.

A Russian milblogger claimed Russian forces took the town of Sviato-Pokrovske, south of Siversk.

=== 14 December ===
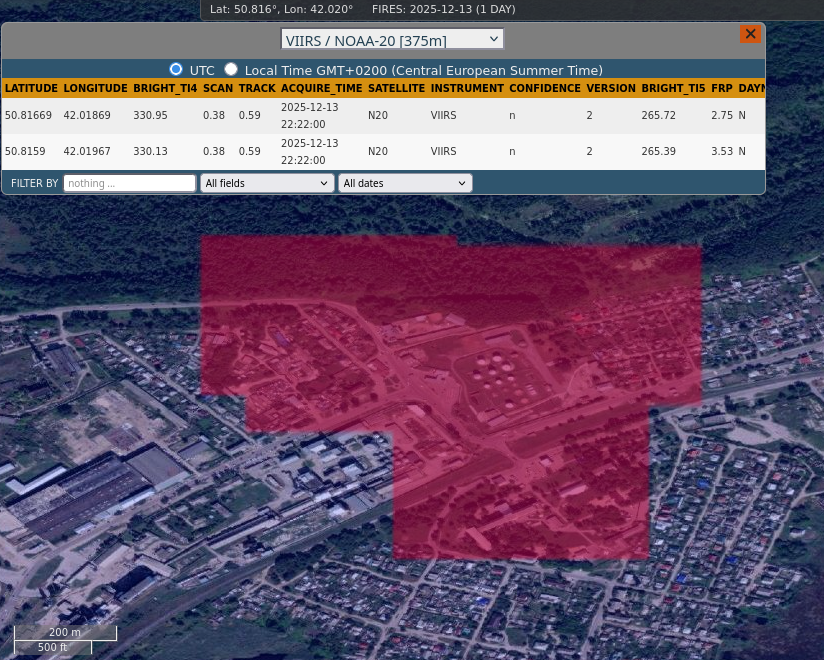
NASA's FIRMS detected fire on 13 December 2025 22:22:00 (UTC) at an oil depot in Uryupinsk, Volgograd Oblast

The Russian defense ministry claimed Russian forces took the town of Varvarivka, north of Huliaipole.

Ukrainian drones set fire to an oil depot in Uryupinsk, Volgograd Oblast, and destroyed two S-400 missile systems in Belgorod Oblast.

=== 15 December ===
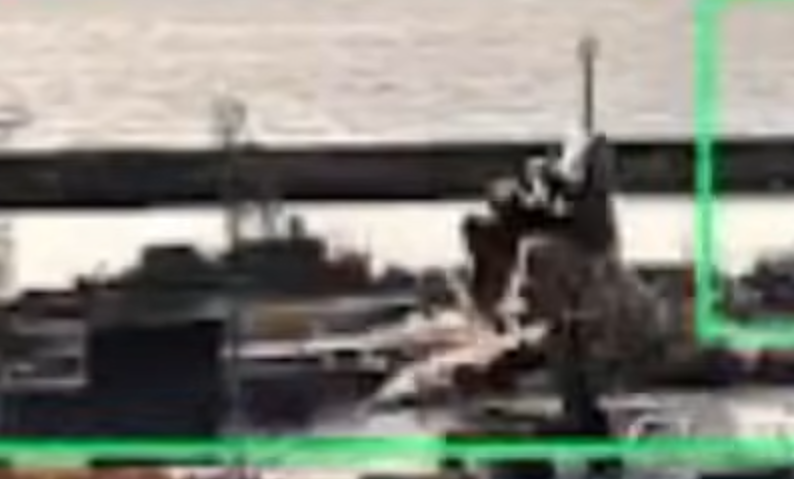
December 2025 explosion of Kilo-class submarine in the Port of Novorossiysk

The SBU published a video showing an explosion off the stern of an unnamed Kilo-class submarine in the Port of Novorossiysk and claimed the submarine was struck by Sea Baby drones. The Sea Baby drones used were a new version that operates completely submerged, like a torpedo. The Russian Black Sea Fleet Spokesperson Alexey Rulev denied the reports of the sinking. The Russian Ministry of Defense-run TV network Zvezda published footage allegedly showing the undamaged submarine. The UK Ministry of Defence considered it highly likely the attacked submarine was the B-271 Kolpino, and noted the submarine was docked where it was attacked as of 18 December 2025, and considered it likely the attack had significantly damaged the submarine, leaving it unable to deploy or sail of its own accord.

A gas processing plant in Astrakhan was struck by Ukrainian drones. Explosions were heard and a large fire was reported at the facility. SBU drones struck an oil platform on the Caspian Sea, the third such strike which resulted in one platform ceasing operations. The Luch thermal power plant in Belgorod was attacked by Ukrainian missiles. Drones struck Moscow, leading to a shutdown of Sheremetyevo International Airport; 15 drones were shot down. In Rostov Oblast, the local governor reported power lines, homes and cars were damaged.

The Russian defense ministry claimed Russian forces took the town of Pishchane, while Russian milbloggers also claimed Russian forces retook the town of Dobropillia, both located near Huliaipole.

=== 16 December ===
The Russian defense ministry claimed Russian forces took the town of Novoplatonivka, north of Borova.

Ukraine and Russia conducted an exchange of civilian detainees with the release of 60 Ukrainians, including 15 from Russian-occupied Kherson Oblast, in exchange for 15 Russians.

=== 17 December ===
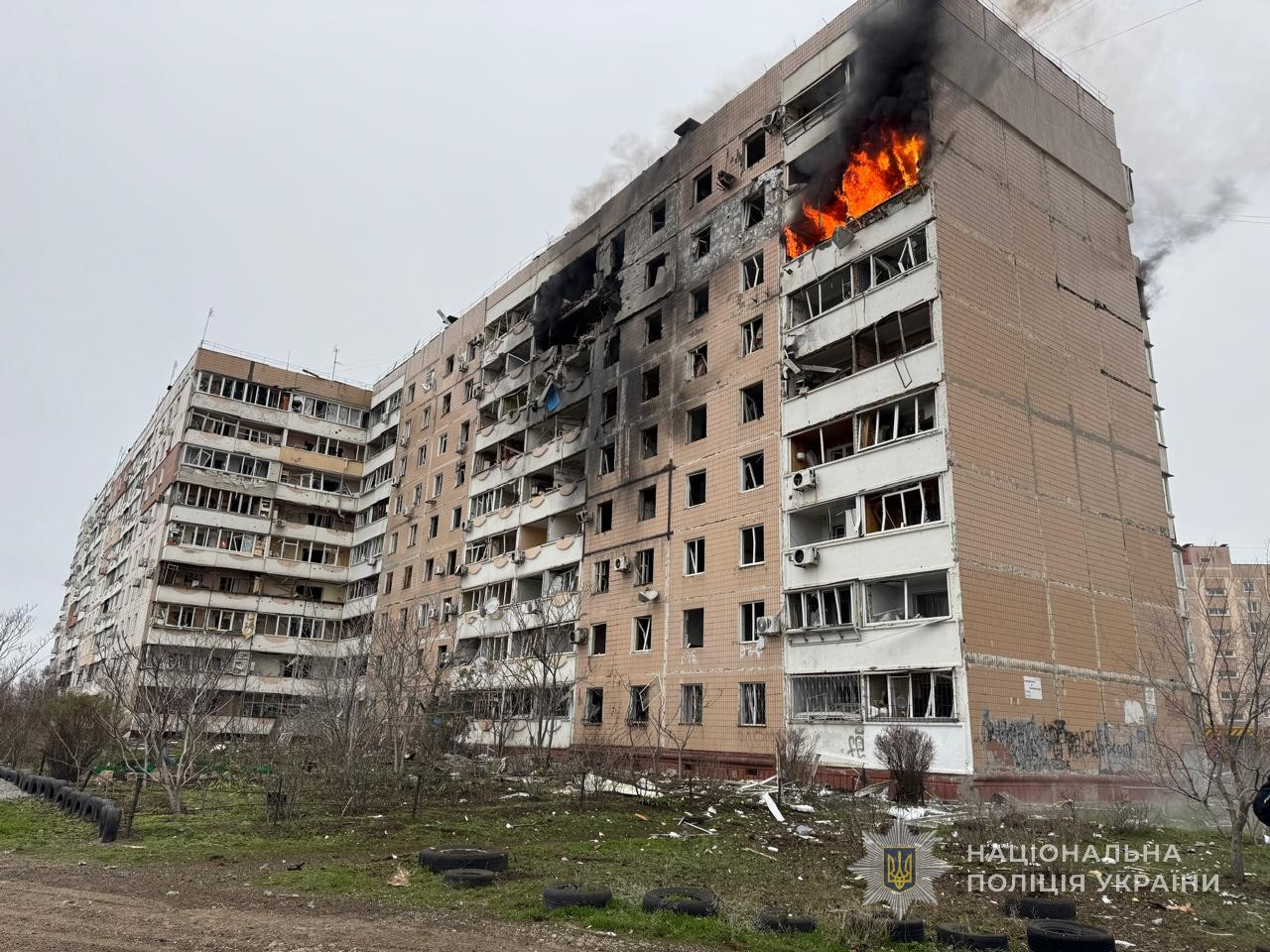
Apartment building in Zaporizhzhia after bomb strike on 17 December

An oil refinery in Slavyansk-on-Kuban was struck by Ukrainian drones. Drones also damaged two power lines in Krasnodar Krai causing a blackout for 38,000 people. The Nikolayevskaya oil depot in Rostov Oblast was damaged as was the river vessel Kapitan Gibert. An ammunition dump in Luhansk Oblast was also struck.

The SBU arrested a Ukrainian soldier on suspicion of spying for Russia.

The Russian defense ministry claimed Russian forces took the town of Hersasymivka, south of Pokrovske.

=== 18 December ===
One person was killed in a Russian drone attack in Odesa Oblast.

Ukrainian drones targeted a cargo ship in Rostov-on-Don, killing two crew members and injuring three others, according to Yury Slyusar, the acting governor of Rostov Oblast. Slyusar also said a civilian was killed by drones in Bataysk. The tanker Valery Gorchakov was sunk near the marine terminal of the Novoshakhtinsk Oil Products Plant. A SBU drone attacked Belbek air base in Crimea, destroying two Nebo-SVU radars, a 92N6 radar connected to a S-400, a Pantsir-S2 air defense system and a MiG-31.

A Ukrainian Mi-24 of the 12th Army Aviation Brigade was shot down while repelling a Russian attack, killing its crew.

Geolocated footage indicated Ukrainian advances in western Fedorivka; and Russian advances north of Ivanopilia, south of Kostiantynivka.

=== 19 December ===
Eight people were killed in a Russian missile attack on a bus in Odesa Oblast.

Ukrainian drones and missiles struck energy infrastructure in Oryol and Rostov-on-Don, causing power outages. A Russian Shadow fleet tanker, the QENDIL, was attacked by the SBU in the Mediterranean Sea near the Greek island of Crete and disabled. In Tolyatti, the TolyattiAzot chemical plant was set on fire by Ukrainian drones. A fourth oil rig in the Caspian Sea, owned by Lukoil, was attacked by Ukrainian drones. The HUR attacked the Central Asia-Center gas pipeline near Romanovka, Olkhovsky District, Volgograd Oblast, resulting in a large explosion.

The European Union agreed to a 90 billion euros ($105.5 billion) interest-free loan for Ukraine that would support its financial requirements during 2026-27. The loan does not use frozen Russian assets.

Ukraine exchanged the bodies of 26 Russian soldiers for those of 1,003 Ukrainians.

Geolocated footage showed Ukrainian forces continued to operate in Kolisnykivka near Borova, an area Russian sources claimed they controlled.

=== 20 December ===
The SBU claimed it destroyed two Su-27s in a drone attack on Belbek airfield in Crimea.

Ukrainian drones attacked the Russian patrol ship Okhotnik and other facilities in the Caspian Sea.

Portugal and Ukraine announced an agreement to jointly produce Ukrainian sea drones.

Russian forces struck the Pivdennyi Port in Odesa Oblast, destroying storage units and infrastructure.

Dmytro Lykhovii, spokesperson for the General Staff of the Armed Forces, stated Russian forces crossed the border into the Ukrainian village of Hrabovske in Sumy Oblast, and claimed Russian forces forcibly displaced some 50 Ukrainian civilians who refused to evacuate the area and took them into Russian territory. Russian milbloggers claimed Russian forces took the town of Vysoke, north of Hrabovske.

=== 21 December ===
Atesh partisans claimed they carried out a sabotage attack on a Russian logistics hub near Rostov-on-Don. The HUR claimed a fire at Lipetsk Air Base destroyed a Russian Su-27 and an Su-30.

The Ukrainian General Staff released new maps confirming Russian presence south of Zelenyi Hai and west of Serhiivka in the Borova area; and northeast of Drobysheve and east of Novomykhailivka in the Lyman area. Ukrainian military observer Kostyantyn Mashovets reported Russian forces advanced to the T-0513 highway between Lyman and Zakitne, and he reported Russian forces took Vasiukivka town near Soledar. Geolocated footage indicated Ukrainian advances on the western edges of Pokrovsk.

=== 22 December ===
Drone strikes were reported in the village of Volna in Temryuksky District, Krasnodar Krai, damaging two vessels and two berths and causing a large fire.

The head of the Operational Training Directorate of the Russian General Staff, Lieutenant General Fanil Sarvarov, was killed in a car bombing in Moscow.

A train in Korosten, Zhytomyr Oblast, derailed after it was attacked by a Russian drone.

Ukrainian drones set fire to the Stavrolen petrochemical plant in Budyonnovsk, Stavropol Krai.

A "Ukrainian-made missile" struck the temporary basing point of the Russian 92nd Riverboat Brigade of the Dnipro River Flotilla in Olenivka, starting a fire.

The 3rd Assault Brigade said a Ukrainian UGV, equipped with a machine gun, held off Russian attacks for 45 days while being operated either remotely or using AI, the first time a position was held solely by an UGV without direct human support.

The Russian Defense Ministry and Russian millbloggers claimed Russian forces took the town of Vilcha and entered Lyman from the south, both near Vovchansk.

=== 23 December ===
Russia launched a wave of air attacks on cities across Ukraine, killing three people in Kyiv, Zhytomyr and Khmelnytskyi Oblasts.

The governor of Belgorod Oblast claimed one person was killed and three injured in a Ukrainian drone attack on Novaya Tavolzhanka.

Ukraine will receive eight SAMP/T NG air defense systems before France and Italy, as per French President Emmanuel Macron.

The Ukrainian General Staff reported its forces withdrew from Siversk. ISW reported Russian forces likely seized the city by 21 December after 41 months of fighting, citing a Ukrainian military observer.

A Ukrainian court convicted a 24-year-old resident of Volyn Oblast on charges of spying for Belarus and sentenced him to 15 years' imprisonment.

The Russian Defense Ministry claimed Russian forces took the town of Andriivka near Pokrovske.

=== 24 December ===
Two Moscow Police officers and a bystander were killed by an IED thrown at them. The HUR claimed responsibility, with a source stating the officers fought in Ukraine and were suspected of torturing Ukrainian POWs.

The Efremov Synthetic Rubber Plant in Tula Oblast was set on fire by Ukrainian drones.

Ukrainian drones struck an "industrial site" in Orenburg according to the local governor. No information about damage was released. Local airports suspended flights during the attack. The HUR claimed responsibility for explosions at a military base in Ussuriysk, Primorsky Krai, the headquarters of the 80th Vitebsk Red Banner Brigade Command. Locals reported police and FSB officers in attendance, while Russian officials blamed the explosion on a "welding machine pop".

A court in Russian-occupied Donetsk Oblast sentenced a Colombian national to 19 years' imprisonment on charges of fighting for Ukraine.

Russian forces struck infrastructure across Odesa Oblast, killing one person and injuring two more.

Russian forces launched a series of strikes targeting energy infrastructure in Chernihiv Oblast, including a facility in the Snovsk urban hromada, leaving the surrounding settlements with no power. Other attacks in the Hromada killed one person and injured another. An FPV drone struck a civilian car in a village in the Novhorod-Siverskyi Raion, killing the driver and injuring a passenger.

The Russian Defense Ministry claimed Russian forces took the town of Zarichne in Zaporizhzhia Oblast.

=== 25 December ===
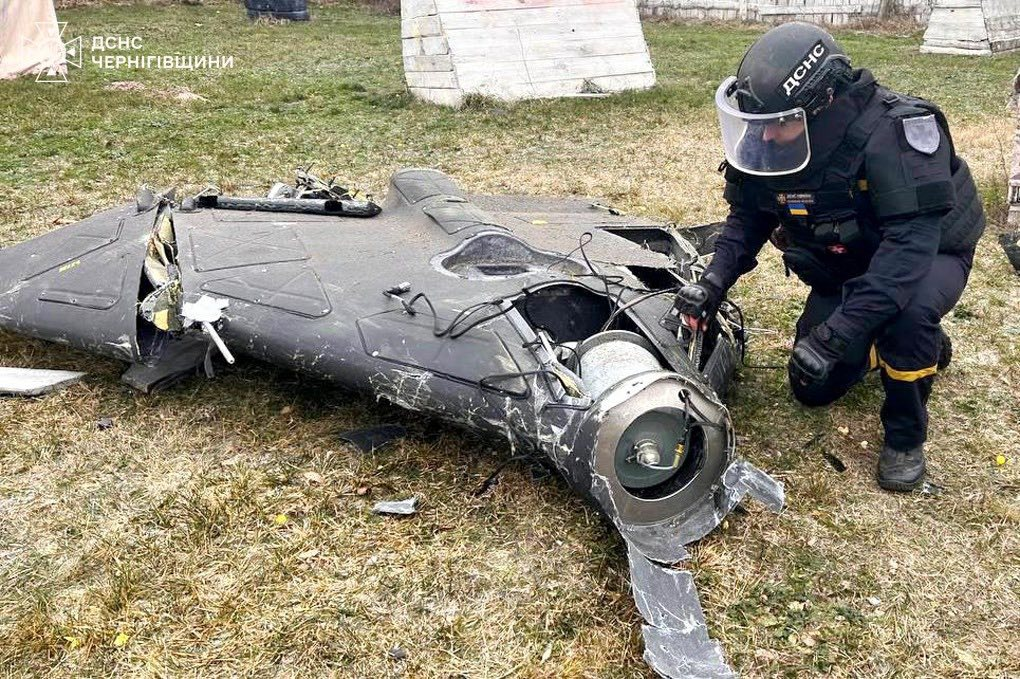
Remains of Shahed 136 found in Chernihiv Oblast on 25 December

Two people were killed in Russian attacks on Chernihiv and Kherson.

Ukrainian drones set fire to two fuel storage tanks at the Black Sea port of Temryuk, resulting in a fire measuring some 2,000 m^{2} (22,000 sq ft). Ukrainian drones struck the 3U-70 unit rack at the Orenburg gas processing plant. NASA FIRMS recorded a fire at the plant. The Novoshakhtinsky Oil Products Plant in Rostov Oblast was struck by Storm Shadow missiles fired by the Ukrainian Air Force.

Ukrainian observer Kostantyn Mashovets claimed Russian forces took the town of Shakhove.

=== 26 December ===
Ukrainian drones struck a Lukoil refinery in Volgograd Oblast. The local governor denied any casualties or damage. However, locals reported explosions, a fire and smoke in the area of the refinery. The governor of Kursk Oblast claimed one person was killed in a drone strike near the Ukrainian border.

A Russian missile struck Uman, injuring six people, including two children. Two people were killed in an attack in Kharkiv.

Russian drones damaged railroad infrastructure at the Kovel station in Kovel, Volyn Oblast.

Geolocated footage showed Russian forces took the towns of Sviato-Pokrovske in Siversk.

The Russian 47th Missile Brigade was attacked by saboteurs in Krasnodar Krai.

=== 27 December ===
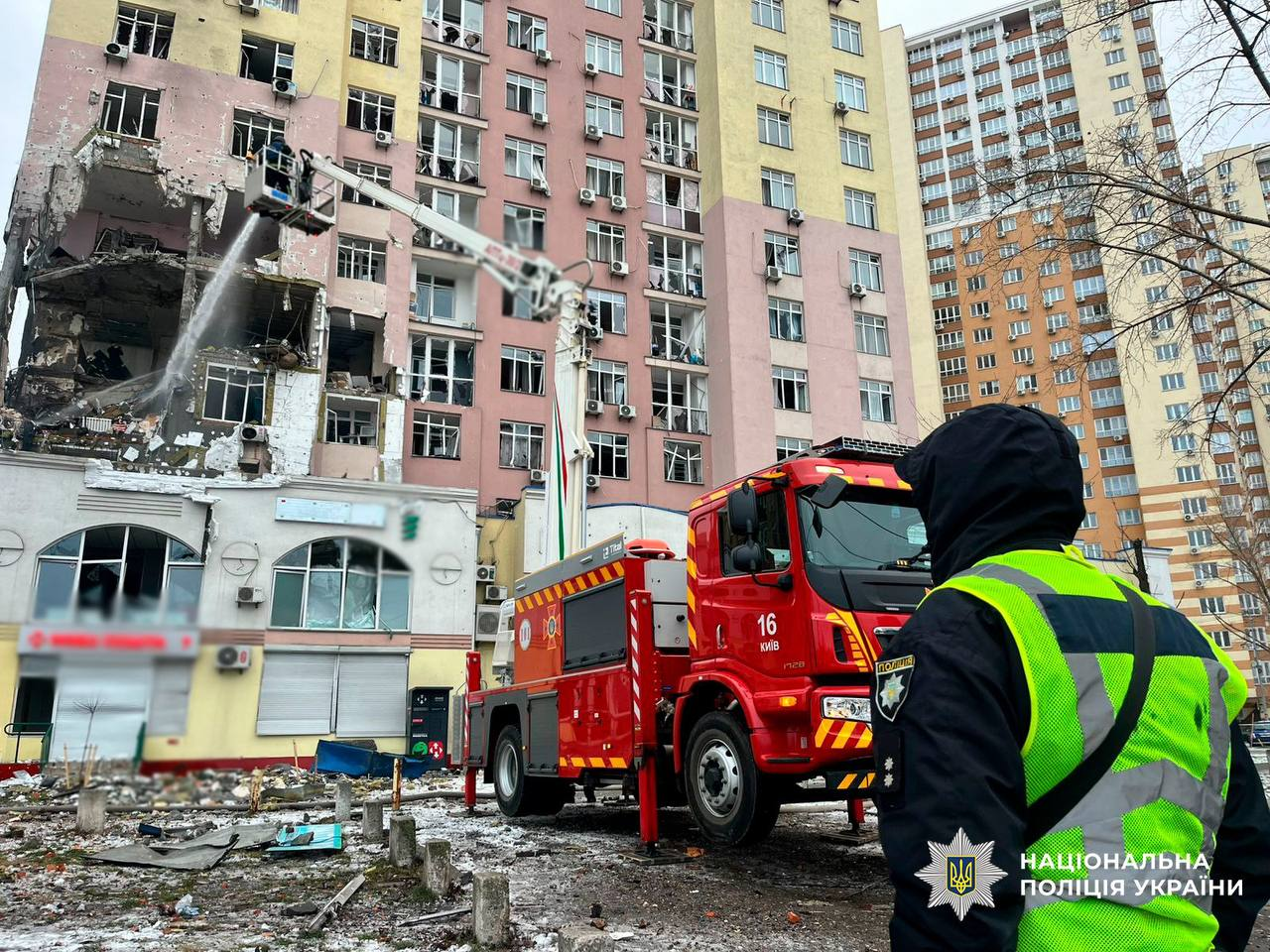
Apartment building in Kyiv after the attack

The Russian Volunteer Corps reported their leader Denis Kapustin was killed in action in Zaporizhzhia Oblast by an FPV drone. However, the group later said he was still alive, and 1 January 2026, the HUR said Ukrainian authorities thwarted a Russian plot to assassinate him.

Two people were killed in a Russian air attack on Kyiv.

The commanders of the Ukrainian 54th Mechanized Brigade, Colonel Oleksii Konoval, and the 10th Mountain Assault Brigade, Colonel Volodymyr Potieshkin, were removed from command having falsified reports about positions that were manned, but in reality had long remained without personnel leading to the fall of Siversk.

Russian milblogger claimed Russian forces seized Andriivka in Sumy Oblast. The commander of the Russian Center Group of Forces, Colonel General Valery Solodchuk claimed Russian forces took the town of Rodynske and Vilne near Dobropillia, while President Putin and other Russian commanders claimed Russian forces took the cities of Myrnohrad and Huliaipole.

Canadian Prime Minister Mark Carney announced Canada would provide an additional $2.5 Billion in economic aid for Ukraine.

=== 28 December ===
The Syzran oil refinery was attacked by Ukrainian drones. Two power substations were also struck, causing blackouts.

The International Atomic Energy Agency announced a temporary ceasefire at the Zaporizhzhia Nuclear Power Plant to allow repairs by technicians at the facility's power transmission lines.

=== 29 December ===
Russian sources claimed Ukrainian drones struck Khanskaya airbase near Maykop. In Tula, Russian sources reported a "ballistic strike", with a ballistic missile being intercepted. Some 14 explosions were reported by locals. Drones also attacked Krasnodar Krai.

Russian Foreign Minister Sergey Lavrov claimed Ukraine launched 91 drones on President Putin's residence near Lake Valdayskoye in Novgorod Oblast, adding there were no injuries or damages and all drones were shot down before reaching their target.

Geolocated footage showed Russian forces took the town of Nove Shakhove. Russian Chief of Staff Valery Gerasimov and Dnieper Group of forces commander Mikhail Teplinsky claimed Russian forces took the town of Lukyanivske near Stepnohirsk, while President Putin, Gerasimov and Western Group of forces commander Sergey Kuzovlev claimed Russian forces took the town of Dibrova, west of Yampil. Gerasimov also claimed Russian forces took the town of Bohuslavka, north of Borova.

=== 30 December ===
The Ukrainian military claimed to have carried out a drone strike on a Russian drone storage facility at Donetsk Airport.

Ukrainian drones struck Moscow's power supply, leaving some 600,000 subscribers without electricity.

Ukrainian drones struck the Tuapse Oil Refinery in Krasnodar Krai, as well as oil infrastructure in Rovenky, Luhansk Oblast.

=== 31 December ===
In Tuapse, Ukrainian drones damaged a gas pipeline, an oil refinery and a pier in the port. SBU drones also struck an oil depot in Rybinsk in Yaroslavl Oblast, resulting in a "large fire".

Deep State UA reported Russian forces took the town of Novomykolaivka in Sumy Oblast.
