= Krasnoglinsky constituency =

Russian legislative constituency

Krasnoglinsky single-member constituency
- Constituency of the Russian State Duma
- Deputy: Denis Portnyagin; United Russia
- Federal subject: Samara Oblast
- Districts: Chelno-Vershinsky, Isaklinsky, Kamyshlinsky, Klyavlinsky, Koshkinsky, Krasnoyarsky, Pokhvistnevo, Pokhvistnevsky, Samara (Kirovsky, Krasnoglinsky), Sergiyevsky, Shentalinsky, Volzhsky (Petra Dubrava, Smyshlyayevka), Yelkhovsky
- Voters: 464,555 (2026)

Krasnoglinsky constituency (No.161 (Note: No.160 in 2016–2026)) is a Russian legislative constituency in Samara Oblast. The constituency covers northern Samara and northern Samara Oblast.

The constituency has been represented since 2026 by United Russia deputy Denis Portnyagin, Hero of Russia and retired Special Operations Forces junior lieutenant, who won the open seat, succeeding five-term United Russia incumbent Viktor Kazakov.

== Boundaries ==
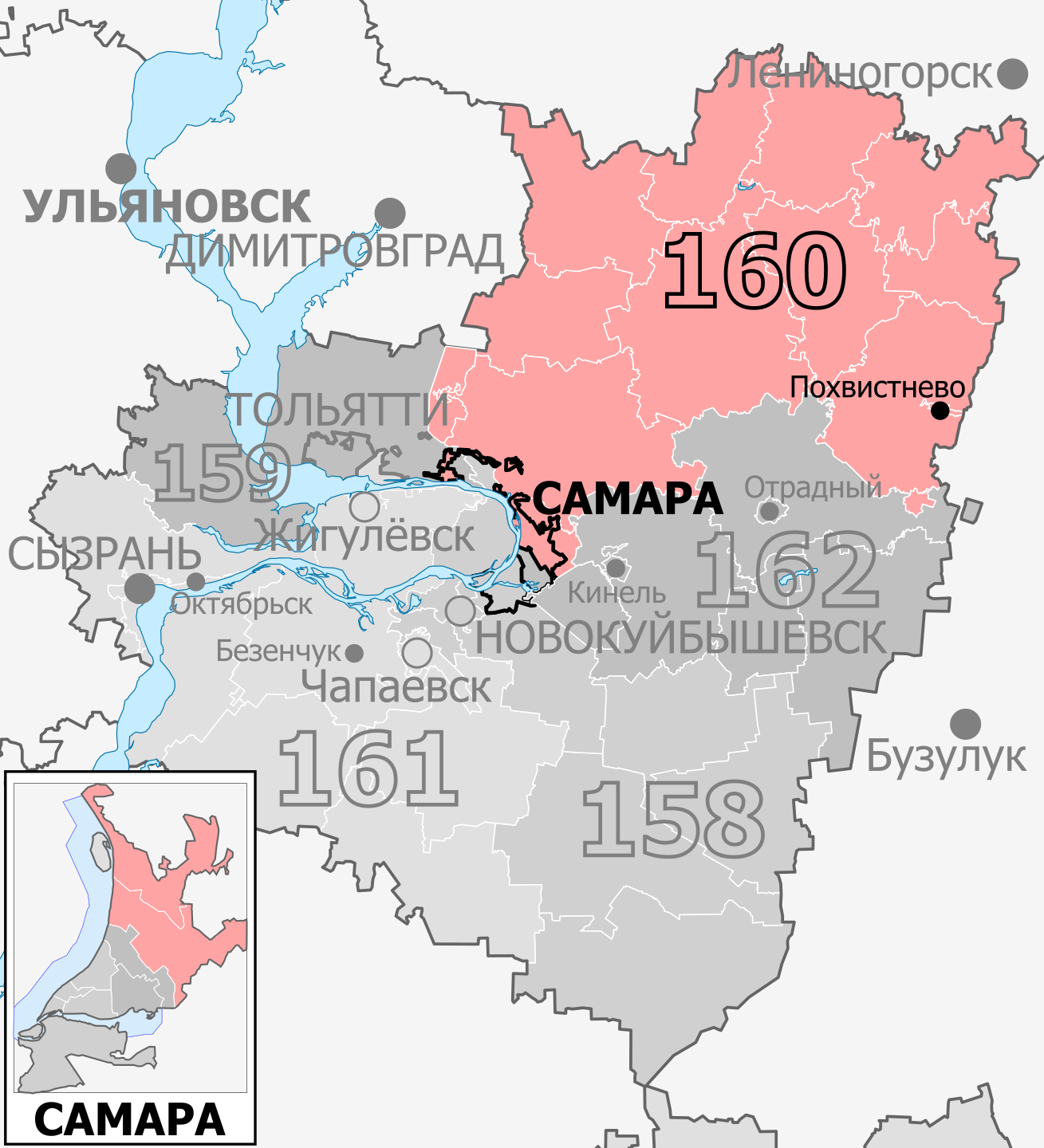
Constituency boundaries from 2016 to 2026

2016–2026: Chelno-Vershinsky District, Isaklinsky District, Kamyshlinsky District, Klyavlinsky District, Koshkinsky District, Krasnoyarsky District, Pokhvistnevo, Pokhvistnevsky District, Samara (Kirovsky, Krasnoglinsky), Sergiyevsky District, Shentalinsky District, Stavropolsky District (Novaya Binaradka, Piskaly), Volzhsky District (Petra Dubrava, Smyshlyayevka), Yelkhovsky District
The constituency was re-created for the 2016 election, covering most of the former Promyshlenny constituency in industrial northern Samara, its suburbs, exurbs and rural areas to the north as well as rural north-western Samara Oblast, which used to be a part of the dissolved Novokuybyshevsk constituency.

2026–present: Chelno-Vershinsky District, Isaklinsky District, Kamyshlinsky District, Klyavlinsky District, Koshkinsky District, Krasnoyarsky District, Pokhvistnevo, Pokhvistnevsky District, Samara (Kirovsky, Krasnoglinsky), Sergiyevsky District, Shentalinsky District, Volzhsky District (Petra Dubrava, Smyshlyayevka), Yelkhovsky District
After the 2025 redistricting the constituency was slightly altered, losing its portion of eastern Stavropolsky District to Tolyatti constituency.

== Members ==
Election	Member	Party
2016	Viktor Kazakov	United Russia
2021	Viktor Kazakov	United Russia
2026	Denis Portnyagin	United Russia

== Election results ==
=== 2016 ===
Summary of the 18 September 2016 Russian legislative election in the Krasnoglinsky constituency
Candidate	Party	Votes	%
Viktor Kazakov	United Russia	182,780	63.63%
Aleksey Leskin	Communist Party	23,948	8.34%
Roman Sinelnikov	Liberal Democratic Party	20,969	7.30%
Svetlana Kuzmina	Communists of Russia	14,020	4.88%
Aleksandr Razuvaev	A Just Russia	9,528	3.32%
Vladislav Ishutin	Yabloko	4,532	1.58%
Vladimir Avdonin	People's Freedom Party	4,219	1.47%
Oksana Kovnir	The Greens	3,943	1.37%
Vitaly Ilyin	Civic Platform	3,778	1.31%
Eduard Pugachev	Party of Growth	3,516	1.22%
Aleksandra Kuzminykh	Independent	2,773	0.97%
Valery Sintsov	Patriots of Russia	2,465	0.86%
Total		287,237	100%

=== 2021 ===
Summary of the 17-19 September 2021 Russian legislative election in the Krasnoglinsky constituency
Candidate	Party	Votes	%
Viktor Kazakov (incumbent)	United Russia	146,172	56.68%
Gennady Govorkov	Communist Party	37,327	14.47%
Roman Sinelnikov	Liberal Democratic Party	13,622	5.28%
Aleksey Sazonov	A Just Russia — For Truth	13,219	5.13%
Aleksey Svetly	Communists of Russia	10,405	4.03%
Nikita Zavtur	New People	9,828	3.81%
Oleg Komarov	The Greens	7,340	2.85%
Grigory Yeremeyev	Russian Party of Freedom and Justice	5,701	2.21%
Aleksandra Kuzminykh	Independent	5,336	2.07%
Total		257,873	100%

=== 2026 ===
Summary of the 18-20 September 2026 Russian legislative election in the Krasnoglinsky constituency
Candidate	Party	Votes	%
Denis Portnyagin	United Russia	196,100	69.04%
Natalya Bobrova	Communist Party	36,742	12.94%
Roman Markarov	New People	17,519	6.17%
Aleksandr Menshikh	Liberal Democratic Party	15,500	5.46%
Aleksey Sazonov	A Just Russia	12,093	4.26%
Total		284,050	100%
