= Novokuybyshevsk constituency =

Russian legislative constituency

Novokuybyshevsk single-member constituency
- Constituency of the Russian State Duma

- Constituency boundaries from 1995 to 2007
- Deputy: None
- Federal subject: Samara Oblast
- Districts: Chapayevsk, Chelno-Vershinsky, Isaklinsky, Kamyshlinsky, Kinel, Kinel-Cherkassky, Kinelsky, Klyavlinsky, Koshkinsky, Novokuybyshevsk, Otradny, Pokhvistnevo, Pokhvistnevsky, Sergiyevsky, Shentalinsky, Volzhsky
- Voters: 500,073 (2003)

The Novokuybyshevsk Constituency (No.151 (Note: No.150 in 1993-1995)) was a Russian legislative constituency in Samara Oblast in 1993–2007. It covered Samara suburbs, Novokuybyshevsk and rural northern Samara Oblast. This seat was last occupied by United Russia deputy Viktor Kazakov, former Vice Governor of Samara Oblast and Yukos executive, who defeated two-term Communist incumbent State Duma member Valentin Romanov in the 2003 election.

The constituency was dissolved in 2007 when State Duma adopted full proportional representation for the next two electoral cycles. Novokuybyshevsk constituency was not re-established for the 2016 election, currently Novokuybyshevsk is a part of Samara constituency, Chapayevsk in Zhigulyovsk constituency, east-central Samara Oblast (including Kinel and Otradny) in Promyshlenny constituency, while northern Samara Oblast was united with northern Samara into new Krasnoglinsky constituency.

== Boundaries ==
1993–1995: Alexeyevsky District, Bezenchuksky District, Bogatovsky District, Bolshechernigovsky District, Bolsheglushitsky District, Borsky District, Chapayevsk, Kinel, Kinel-Cherkassky District, Khvorostyansky District, Kinelsky District, Krasnoarmeysky District, Neftegorsky District, Novokuybyshevsk, Otradny, Pestravsky District, Privolzhsky District, Volzhsky District
The constituency covered Samara suburbs, industrial town Novokuybyshevsk and stretched to the rural eastern and south-eastern Samara Oblast, including the towns of Chapayevsk, Kinel and Otradny.

1995–2007: Chapayevsk, Chelno-Vershinsky District Isaklinsky District, Kamyshlinsky District, Kinel, Kinel-Cherkassky District, Kinelsky District, Klyavlinsky District, Koshkinsky District, Novokuybyshevsk, Otradny, Pokhvistnevo, Pokhvistnevsky District, Sergiyevsky District, Shentalinsky District Volzhsky District
After 1995 redistricting the constituency was pushed to northern Samara Oblast, which was previously part of Syzran constituency. The seat consequently lost its tail to south-eastern part of the region to Syzran constituency.

== Members ==
Election	Member	Party
1993	Galina Gusarova	Women of Russia
1995	Valentin Romanov	Communist Party
1995	Valentin Romanov	Communist Party
2003	Viktor Kazakov	United Russia

== Election results ==
=== 1993 ===
==== Declared candidates ====
- Vsevolod Davydov (Independent), construction businessman
- Sergey Gulin (YaBL), attorney
- Galina Gusarova (Women of Russia), Chairwoman of the Samara Oblast Committee on Family, Motherhood and Childhood (1991–present)
- Yevgeny Panov (Independent), munitions plant director
- Oleg Sokolov (BR–NI), chairman of Free Russia party youth organization
- Sergey Terentyev (DPR), party regional office property manager
- Vladimir Timofeyev (Independent), chief of wages at oil and gas production department

==== Results ====
Summary of the 12 December 1993 Russian legislative election in the Novokuybyshevsk constituency
Candidate	Party	Votes	%
Galina Gusarova	Women of Russia	160,190	52.94%
Sergey Gulin	Yavlinsky–Boldyrev–Lukin	21,873	7.23%
Sergey Terentyev	Democratic Party	20,603	6.81%
Vladimir Timofeyev	Independent	20,603	6.81%
Vsevolod Davydov	Independent	17,127	5.66%
Oleg Sokolov	Future of Russia–New Names	8,468	2.80%
against all		37,309	12.33%
Total		302,571	100%

=== 1995 ===
==== Declared candidates ====
- Valery Ageyev (Independent), deputy commander of the 2nd Guards Tank Army
- Vera Lekareva (NDR), union sports facilities director
- Valentin Romanov (CPRF), former First Secretary of the CPSU Kuybyshev Oblast Committee (1990–1991)
- Sergey Salnikov (LDPR), aide to chief of Kinel militsiya

==== Withdrawn candidates ====
- Valery Fateyev (DVR–OD), Member of Federation Council (1994–present), former Governor of Smolensk Oblast (1991–1993)

==== Declined ====
- Galina Gusarova (Women of Russia), incumbent Member of State Duma (1994–present)

==== Results ====
Summary of the 17 December 1995 Russian legislative election in the Novokuybyshevsk constituency
Candidate	Party	Votes	%
Valentin Romanov	Communist Party	170,575	49.38%
Vera Lekareva	Our Home – Russia	68,440	19.81%
Sergey Salnikov	Liberal Democratic Party	35,508	10.28%
Valery Ageyev	Independent	30,327	8.78%
against all		31,243	9.04%
Total		345,419	100%

=== 1999 ===
==== Declared candidates ====
- Oleg Dyachenko (Independent), Member of Samara Regional Duma (1997–present), gas distribution executive
- Konstantin Glodev (Independent), MMM bankruptcy trustee
- Valentin Romanov (CPRF), incumbent Member of State Duma (1996–present), 1996 gubernatorial candidate
- Vyacheslav Volov (DN), rector of Modern University for the Humanities, Samara branch (1996–present)

==== Withdrawn candidates ====
- Nikolay Kamynin (Independent)

==== Did not file ====
- Pavel Fedoseyev (Independent)
- Vladimir Kulikov (Independent)
- Yevgeny Lartsev (Yabloko), trading executive
- Dmitry Sinitsyn (RSP), manager
- Mikhail Yeremeyev (Independent)

==== Results ====
Summary of the 19 December 1999 Russian legislative election in the Novokuybyshevsk constituency
Candidate	Party	Votes	%
Valentin Romanov (incumbent)	Communist Party	147,650	45.06%
Oleg Dyachenko	Independent	125,579	38.33%
Konstantin Glodev	Independent	9,190	2.80%
Vyacheslav Volov	Spiritual Heritage	8,940	2.73%
against all		29,242	8.92%
Total		327,660	100%

=== 2003 ===
==== Declared candidates ====
- Rinat Akhmedshin (Independent), judge of the Samara Oblast Court
- Viktor Kazakov (United Russia), Vice Governor of Samara Oblast (2003–present)
- Rinat Karimov (VR–ES), chairman of the Civic Party of Russia executive committee
- Vladimir Nenashev (SPS), nonprofit director
- Gennady Petrikov (Independent), agriculture specialist
- Valentin Romanov (CPRF), incumbent Member of State Duma (1996–present), 1996 and 2000 gubernatorial candidate
- Dmitry Suchkov (ORP Rus'), voting observation activist

==== Did not file ====
- Yevgeny Popov (KPE), programmer
- Nikolay Stepanov (DPR), prison junior inspector
- Nikolay Yevtushenko (LDPR), sports club director

==== Results ====
Summary of the 7 December 2003 Russian legislative election in the Novokuybyshevsk constituency
Candidate	Party	Votes	%
Viktor Kazakov	United Russia	172,201	61.38%
Valentin Romanov (incumbent)	Communist Party	66,778	23.80%
Gennady Petrikov	Independent	3,984	1.42%
Rinat Karimov	Great Russia – Eurasian Union	3,706	1.32%
Vladimir Nenashev	Union of Right Forces	2,999	1.07%
Rinat Akhmedshin	Independent	2,460	0.88%
Dmitry Suchkov	United Russian Party Rus'	2,365	0.84%
against all		21,340	7.61%
Total		280,626	100%
