= Promyshlenny constituency =

Russian legislative constituency

Promyshlenny single-member constituency
- Constituency of the Russian State Duma

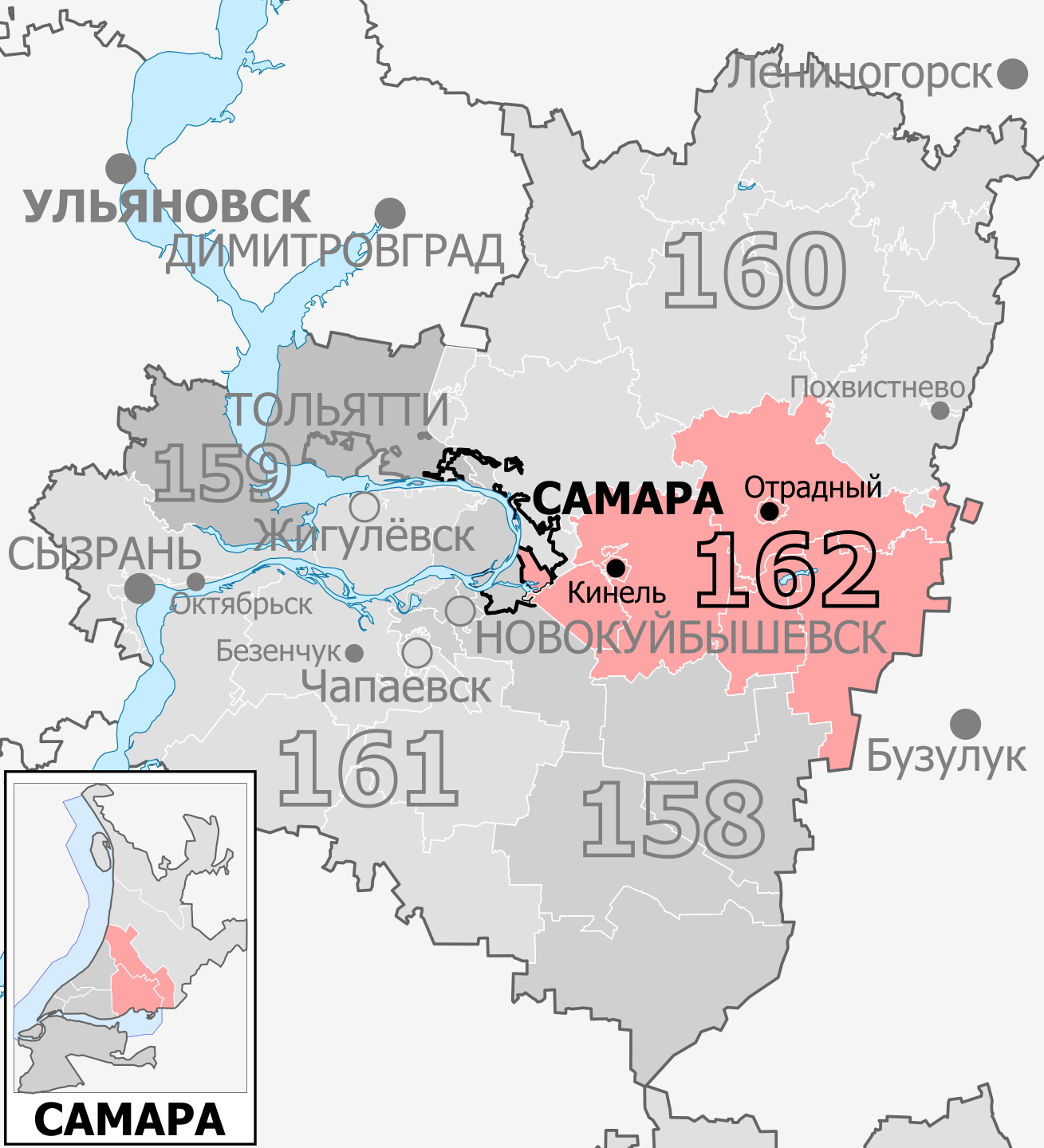
- Constituency boundaries since 2016
- Deputy: Aleksandr Zhivaykin; United Russia
- Federal subject: Samara Oblast
- Districts: Bogatovsky, Borsky, Kinel, Kinel-Cherkassky, Kinelsky, Otradny, Samara (Promyshlenny, Sovetsky), Volzhsky (Prosvet, Chernovsky, Roshchinsky, Spiridonovka)
- Voters: 482,961 (2026)

Promyshlenny constituency (No.163 (Note: No.151 in 1993-1995, No.152 in 1995-2007, No.162 in 2016–2026)) is a Russian legislative constituency in Samara Oblast. The constituency covers eastern Samara and east-central Samara Oblast.

The constituency has been represented since 2026 by United Russia deputy Aleksandr Zhivaykin, former Member of Samara Regional Duma and Samara deputy mayor, who defeated one-term Communist incumbent Mikhail Matveyev.

== Boundaries ==
1993–1995: Samara (Kirovsky, Krasnoglinsky, Promyshlenny)
The constituency covered mostly industrial northern Samara.

1995–2007: Krasnoyarsky District, Samara (Kirovsky, Krasnoglinsky, Promyshlenny), Yelkhovsky District
The constituency was significantly altered following the 1995 redistricting, gaining northern Samara suburbs and exurbs in Krasnoyarsky and Yelkhovsky districts from Syzran constituency.

2016–present: Bogatovsky District, Borsky District, Kinel, Kinel-Cherkassky District, Kinelsky District, Otradny, Samara (Promyshlenny, Sovetsky), Volzhsky District (Prosvet, Chernovsky, Roshchinsky, Spiridonovka)
The constituency was re-created for the 2016 election and retained only Promyshlenny City District of Samara, losing the rest to new Krasnoglinsky constituency. This seat instead gained Sovetsky City District from Samara constituency and was pushed eastwards to gain a swath of rural areas from the former Novokuybyshevsk and Syzran constituencies.

== Members ==
Election	Member	Party
1993	Nikolay Chukanov	Independent
1995	Albert Makashov	Communist Party
1995	Vera Lekareva	Union of Right Forces
2003	Albert Makashov	Communist Party
2007	Proportional representation - no election by constituency	
2011	Proportional representation - no election by constituency	
2016	Igor Stankevich	United Russia
2021	Mikhail Matveyev	Communist Party
2026	Aleksandr Zhivaykin	United Russia

== Election results ==
=== 1993 ===
Summary of the 12 December 1993 Russian legislative election in the Promyshlenny constituency
Candidate	Party	Votes	%
Nikolay Chukanov	Independent	58,639	25.48%
Lidia Verbitskaya	Independent	33,634	14.61%
Vladimir Grom	Independent	19,347	8.41%
Aleksandr Bakhmurov	Democratic Party	13,062	5.68%
Boris Gusev	Independent	12,902	5.61%
Vladimir Tretyak	Russian Democratic Reform Movement	10,930	4.75%
Georgy Kutuzov	Choice of Russia	8,705	3.78%
Vladimir Matrosov	Independent	7,064	3.07%
Aleksandr Kondratyev	Yavlinsky–Boldyrev–Lukin	6,850	2.98%
Sergey Trakhirov	Independent	4,218	1.83%
Sergey Shvaykin	Future of Russia–New Names	1,896	0.82%
Vladimir Nayanov	Dignity and Charity	1,587	0.69%
against all		26,808	11.65%
Total		230,159	100%

=== 1995 ===
Summary of the 17 December 1995 Russian legislative election in the Promyshlenny constituency
Candidate	Party	Votes	%
Albert Makashov	Communist Party	101,208	32.52%
German Shatsky	Bloc of Independents	37,081	11.92%
Valentina Zhuravleva	Women of Russia	27,164	8.73%
Nikolay Chukanov (incumbent)	Ivan Rybkin Bloc	26,072	8.38%
Sergey Arsentyev	Independent	19,355	6.22%
Nina Vyalova	Forward, Russia!	12,146	3.90%
Vitaly Gusenkov	Independent	10,342	3.32%
Vadim Kalakutsky	Democratic Choice of Russia – United Democrats	9,854	3.17%
Valery Kirillov	Independent	8,841	2.84%
Aleksandr Paulov	Russian Lawyers' Association	8,253	2.65%
Aleksandr Tverdokhleb	Democratic Russia and Free Trade Unions	3,384	1.09%
Aleksey Syzgantsev	Independent	2,947	0.95%
Dmitry Minyukov	Stable Russia	2,675	0.86%
Anatoly Osaulenko	Independent	881	0.28%
against all		32,952	10.59%
Total		311,181	100%

=== 1999 ===
Summary of the 19 December 1999 Russian legislative election in the Promyshlenny constituency
Candidate	Party	Votes	%
Vera Lekareva	Union of Right Forces	83,707	28.17%
Vasily Cheryomushkin	Unity	50,233	16.91%
Alla Demina	Independent	28,859	9.71%
Anatoly Povlyuchenko	Congress of Russian Communities-Yury Boldyrev Movement	17,083	5.75%
Allan Chumak	Independent	9,405	3.17%
Yury Venediktov	Liberal Democratic Party	9,043	3.04%
Rinat Akhmedshin	Independent	5,927	1.99%
Aleksandr Kokorev	Russian Socialist Party	4,501	1.51%
against all		78,463	26.41%
Total		297,114	100%

=== 2003 ===
Summary of the 7 December 2003 Russian legislative election in the Promyshlenny constituency
Candidate	Party	Votes	%
Albert Makashov	Communist Party	80,402	33.09%
Vera Lekareva (incumbent)	Independent	44,936	18.49%
Mikhail Fedorov	United Russia	40,949	16.85%
Svetlana Batishcheva	Yabloko	10,793	4.44%
Yury Venediktov	Liberal Democratic Party	10,395	4.28%
Vitaly Gusenkov	Independent	6,872	2.83%
Aleksandr Telegin	Party of Russia's Rebirth-Russian Party of Life	3,199	1.32%
Viktor Guzhov	Independent	2,882	1.19%
Denis Kolosov	United Russian Party Rus'	2,675	1.10%
Sergey Sidorov	Independent	1,216	0.50%
against all		34,672	14.27%
Total		243,296	100%

=== 2016 ===
Summary of the 18 September 2016 Russian legislative election in the Promyshlenny constituency
Candidate	Party	Votes	%
Igor Stankevich	United Russia	114,918	46.71%
Konstantin Ryadnov	Communist Party	33,931	13.79%
Yury Venediktov	Liberal Democratic Party	27,472	11.17%
Vera Lekareva	A Just Russia	19,544	7.94%
Vladimir Obukhov	Civic Platform	12,238	4.97%
Sergey Igumenov	Communists of Russia	8,929	3.63%
Aleksandr Semerozubov	Yabloko	5,972	2.43%
Anton Guskov	Party of Growth	4,636	1.88%
Yekaterina Parkhomenko	Independent	4,615	1.88%
Anton Puntok	People's Freedom Party	2,566	1.04%
Total		246,017	100%

=== 2021 ===
Summary of the 17-19 September 2021 Russian legislative election in the Promyshlenny constituency
Candidate	Party	Votes	%
Mikhail Matveyev	Communist Party	68,817	34.71%
Igor Stankevich (incumbent)	United Russia	65,826	33.20%
Aleksandr Chernyshev	A Just Russia — For Truth	12,143	6.12%
Aleksandr Stepanov	Liberal Democratic Party	10,032	5.06%
Maksim Gnatyuk	New People	9,539	4.81%
Arina Romanova	The Greens	7,575	3.82%
Aleksey Dolbilov	Party of Pensioners	7,496	3.78%
Valery Barsuk	Rodina	3,854	1.94%
Sergey Stepanov	Russian Party of Freedom and Justice	3,414	1.72%
Total		198,275	100%

=== 2026 ===
Summary of the 18-20 September 2026 Russian legislative election in the Promyshlenny constituency
Candidate	Party	Votes	%
Aleksandr Zhivaykin	United Russia	92,006	41.48%
Mikhail Matveyev (incumbent)	Communist Party	67,239	30.31%
Maksim Venediktov	Liberal Democratic Party	19,835	8.94%
Yulia Pletneva	A Just Russia	12,600	5.68%
Anna Sarantseva	Party of Pensioners	11,665	5.26%
Sergey Minayev	Communists of Russia	8,196	3.70%
Total		221,811	100%
