= Pokhvistnevo railway station =

Railway station in Russia

Pokhvistnevo Похвистнево
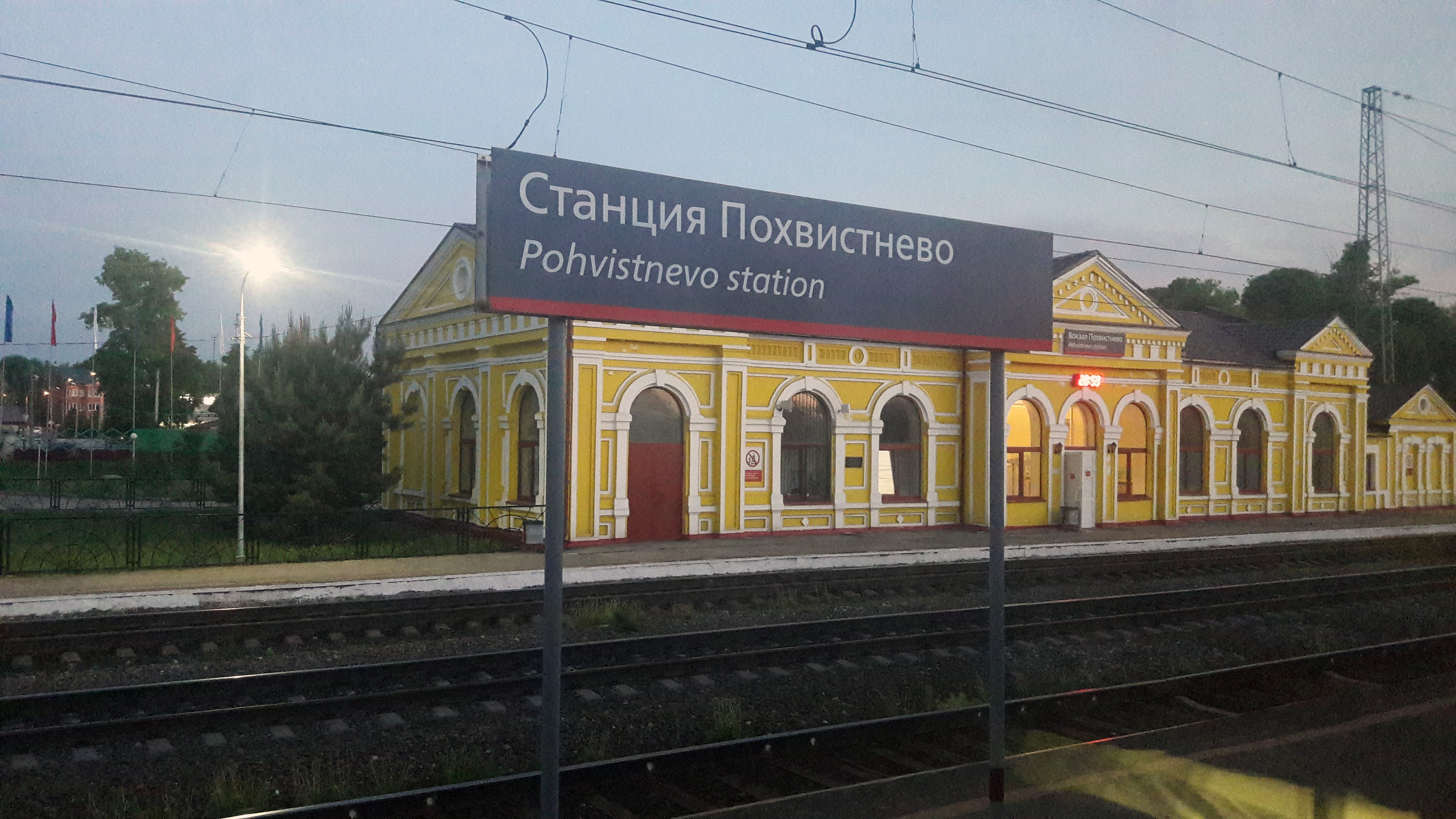

General information
- Location: Pokhvistnevo, Samara Oblast, Russia
- Coordinates: 53°39′07″N 52°07′49″E
- Platforms: 2

Construction
- Parking: yes

Other information
- Station code: 65930

History
- Opened: 8 September 1888
Location

Pokhvistnevo railway station (Russian: станция Похвистнево) is a mainline railway station located in Pokhvistnevo, Samara Oblast, Russia. It is part of the Kuybyshev Railway, on the line between Samara railway station and Ufa Station. It is located in the town centre.

== History ==
A station at Pokhvistnevo was first opened on 8 September 1888 as part of the Samara-Ufa railway, and the beginnings of a rail line between Samara and Zlatoust. The present station building dates from 1905, and has been rebuilt several times since, but retaining its original form. It is an example of Renaissance Revival architecture, and has a 24.3 metre symmetrical facade. The station was built in the historical centre of the town, and in pre-revolutionary times had four fountains and a greenhouse in front of the station's entrance.

The station underwent a major overhaul in 2010, with the external facade being reconstructed and restored to its appearance as it was in the early 20th century, using contemporary drawings and photographs.

== Services ==
The station and its services are operated by Russian Railways. More than 80 long-distance and suburban trains pass through Pokhvistnevo station daily. The nearest junction stations are Chishmy railway station, 317 kilometres away, which connects to the line to Inza railway station; and Kinel railway station, 118 kilometres away, which connects to the line to Iletsk I. The station handles both passengers and cargo.

=== Long-distance services ===
Train number	Destination	Train number	Destination
11	Vladivostok - Samara	12	Samara - Vladivostok
13	Chelyabinsk - Moscow	14	Moscow - Chelyabinsk
59	Nozokuznetsk - Kislovodsk	60	Kislovodsk - Nozokuznetsk
97	Tynda - Kislovodsk	98	Kislovodsk - Tynda
101	Nizhnevartovsk - Penza	102	Penza - Nizhnevartovsk
123	Novosibirsk - Belgorod	124	Belgorod - Novosibirsk
127	Krasnoyarsk - Adler	128	Adler - Krasnoyarsk
141	Perm - Simferopol	142	Simferopol - Perm
147	Nizhnevartovsk - Astrakhan	148	Astrakhan - Nizhnevartovsk
193	Magnitogorsk - Moscow	-	-
203	Tomsk - Anapa	204	Anapa - Tomsk
253	Nizhnevartovsk - Adler	254	Adler - Nizhnevartovsk
289	Yekaterinburg - Anapa	291	Anapa - Yekaterinburg
345	Nizhnevartovsk - Adler	346	Adler - Nizhnevartovsk
-	-	408	Adler - Chelyabinsk
453	Ufa - Novorossiysk	454	Novorossiysk - Ufa
455	Chelyabinsk - Novorossiysk	456	Novorossiysk - Chelyabinsk
461	Ufa - Adler	462	Adler - Ufa
