= Klyavlino =

Klyavlino (Russian: Клявлино) is the name of several rural localities in Klyavlinsky District of Samara Oblast, Russia:

- Klyavlino (railway station), a railway station classified as a rural locality
- Klyavlino (selo), a selo
