= Rock on the Volga =

Rock Festival in Samara, Russia

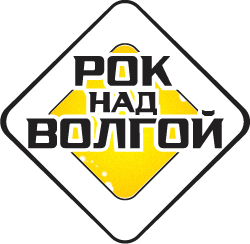
- Genre: Rock festival
- Locations: Samara, Samara Oblast, Russia
- Years active: 2009-2013, 2020 years
- Inaugurated: 12 June 2009
- Most recent: 8 June 2013
- Next event: 2021 or 2022
- Attendance: 692,000 people (2013)
- Website: www.rocknadvolgoi.ru

Rock on the Volga (Russian: Рок над Волгой) was an international rock festival that was held annually from 2009 to 2013 and is timed to coincide with the Day of Russia. It is carried out on the territory of Samara and the Samara Region. In 2009–2011, the venue of the festival was the field "Red Plowman", and in 2012-2013 - the field near the village of Petra Dubrava.

The festival was held with the support of the Samara region; admission to the festival was free.

In 2019, the resumption of the festival in 2020 was announced. It was supposed to take place on June 27, 2020. The Samara Arena stadium was chosen as the venue for the festival. However, amid the situation with the COVID-19 pandemic, the festival was canceled.

== Chronology ==
=== 2009 ===
The festival was first held on June 12, 2009. The number of visitors was 167,000 people.

The hosts of the festival were football commentator Vasily Utkin, tennis player Anastasia Myskina and the Quartet I theater. Tatyana Zykina also performed at the festival, and the U-Piter group was accompanied by the symphony orchestra of the Samara Philharmonic Society.

It was shown on TV on August 1, 2009 on the TV Center channel.

Festival participants: Give2, What More, Sea!, F.P.G., Mordor, Chaif, Aquarium, Aria, Chizh & Co, Ken Hensley, DDT, U-Piter, Splean, King and Jester, Agatha Christie, Apocalyptica, Alisa.

=== 2010 ===
The second festival took place at the same location on June 12, 2010. The festival was attended by 220,000 people.

The hosts of the festival were the showman of the AuktsYon group Oleg Garkusha, actors Dmitry Dyuzhev and Konstantin Khabensky, as well as TV presenter Elena Perova.

It was shown on TV on June 13, 2010 on Channel One.

Festival participants: Mordor, Chaif, U-Piter, Aquarium, Time Machine, Korol i Shut, Agatha Christie, Pelageya, Splean, Kipelov, Deep Purple, Alisa.
