= Koshki =

Koshki (Russian: Кошки) is the name of several rural localities in Russia:

- Koshki, Chuvash Republic, a village in Bolsheshatminskoye Rural Settlement of Krasnoarmeysky District of the Chuvash Republic
- Koshki, Komi Republic, a village in Seregovo Selo Administrative Territory of Knyazhpogostsky District of the Komi Republic
- Koshki, Republic of Tatarstan, a selo in Alkeyevsky District of the Republic of Tatarstan
- Koshki, Samara Oblast, a selo in Koshkinsky District of Samara Oblast
