= Kamyshla =

Kamyshla (Russian: Камышла) is the name of several rural localities in Russia:

- Kamyshla, Orenburg Oblast, a settlement in Azamatovsky Selsoviet of Matveyevsky District of Orenburg Oblast
- Kamyshla, Samara Oblast, a selo in Kamyshlinsky District of Samara Oblast
