= Yelkhovsky =

Yelkhovsky (masculine), Yelkhovskaya (feminine), or Yelkhovskoye (neuter) may refer to:

- Yelkhovsky District, a district of Samara Oblast, Russia
- Yelkhovsky (rural locality), a rural locality (a settlement) in Sverdlovsk Oblast, Russia
