= Novokuybyshevsk oil refinery =

Novokuybyshevsk Oil Refinery
- Type: Joint-stock company
- Industry: Oil refining
- Founded: 1951
- Headquarters: Novokuybyshevsk, Samara Oblast, Russia
- Key people: Sergey Nikolaevich Golitsayev (General Director)
- Products: Petroleum products, including gasoline
- Number of employees: 3,952
- Parent: PJSC Rosneft

The Novokuybyshevsk Oil Refinery (Russian: Новокуйбышевский нефтеперерабатывающий завод) is a Russian oil refinery in Samara Oblast. It is part of the Rosneft Group.

The company's headquarters are located in Novokuybyshevsk.

The refinery has a processing capacity of 8.8 million tonnes of crude oil per year.

== History ==
In 1947, a decision was made to construct the Novokuybyshevsk Oil Refinery, and construction began in 1949.

The refinery was commissioned in 1951, when its first batch of motor gasoline was shipped. The facility was designed to produce, among other advanced products for the Soviet Union, fuel for jet engines and oils for launch vehicles and passenger cars.

During the Soviet period, the refinery was modernized twice, in 1959–1965 and 1971–1975.

On 17 November 1992, the oil company Yukos was established. Shares in the Novokuybyshevsk Oil Refinery were contributed to its charter capital. In the late 1990s, Yukos modernized its oil-refining facilities in Samara Oblast. As part of this program, technological processes were divided among the group's enterprises. The capacity of the Novokuybyshevsk refinery was consequently optimized for maximum oil-processing depth. Heavy distillates were supplied to the refinery for further processing from the Samara Refinery and Syzran Refinery.

In May 2007, the Novokuybyshevsk Oil Refinery was acquired by Rosneft. A new stage of modernization began at the enterprise, resulting in the production of new products, including diesel fuel meeting European quality standards and new-generation road bitumen.

During the Russian invasion of Ukraine, the refinery was repeatedly targeted by Ukrainian drone attacks.

== Operations ==
The Novokuybyshevsk Oil Refinery is the largest oil-refining enterprise among the refineries of the Samara group of PJSC Rosneft. It produces fuel for all types of transport, including road, aviation, railway, river and sea transport, as well as components for lubricating oils, bitumen, coke and petrochemical products.

The refinery's products, numbering about 30 types, are shipped by rail, road and river transport throughout Russia and abroad. Its distribution geography covers about 90 regions of Russia and neighboring countries.

The enterprise has switched to full production of Euro-5 gasoline and diesel fuel, meeting the requirements of the Technical Regulations of the Customs Union. Construction of facilities for a hydrocracking complex for heavy oil fractions is continuing. Its commissioning is expected to significantly increase the depth of oil refining and the yield of light products.

The quality of the refinery's products was recognized through its victory in the national 100 Best Goods of Russia competition.

== Environmental program ==
The refinery implements a targeted environmental program covering three areas: reducing atmospheric emissions, improving the efficiency of wastewater treatment and recirculating water-supply facilities, and waste management.

As part of the program, wastewater treatment has been strengthened, including additional treatment using membrane bioreactor technology, and water withdrawal from the Volga for industrial facilities has been reduced.

Since 2019, the refinery has also produced SMT Type A environmentally friendly marine fuel for river and sea vessels. The sulfur content of this fuel is less than 0.1%.
