= Pokhvistnevo Urban Okrug =

- District
- Coordinates: 53°42′N 52°06′E
- Country: Russia
- Federal subject: Mandatory parameter. Please, specify
- Administrative center: Pokhvistnevo

Area
  - Total: 64.77 km^{2} (25.01 sq mi)
- Time zone: UTC+4 (MSK+1)
- OKTMO ID: 36727000

Pokhvistnevo Urban Okrug is an urban okrug in Samara Oblast, Russia. It includes the administrative territorial entities of Pokhvistnevo. The administrative center is Pokhvistnevo.
