= Yelkhovka, Yelkhovsky District, Samara Oblast =

Rural locality in Samara Oblast, Russia

Coordinates: 53°51′56″N 50°17′03″E

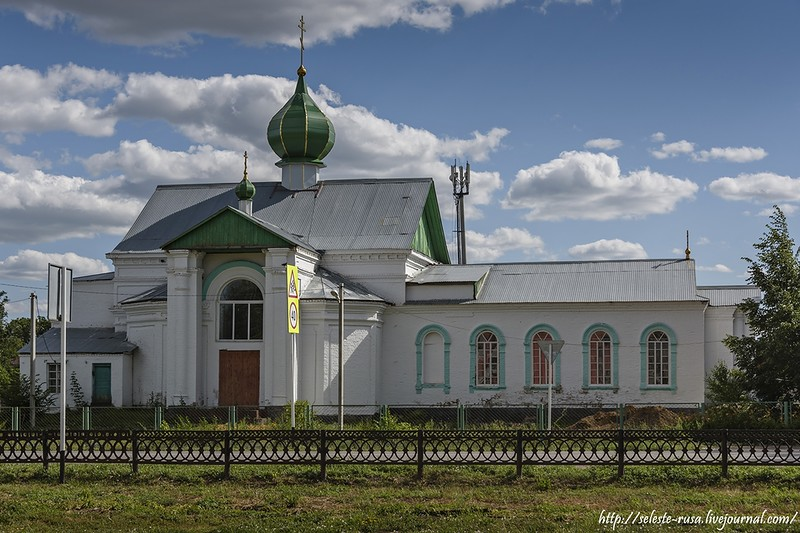
Church of Holy Trinity

Yelkhovka (Russian: Елховка) is a rural locality (a selo) and the administrative center of Yelkhovsky District, Samara Oblast, Russia. Population: 3,268 (2010 census); 3,166 (2002 census);
