= Mikhail Matveyev (politician) =

Russian politician and historian

- Михаил Матвеев
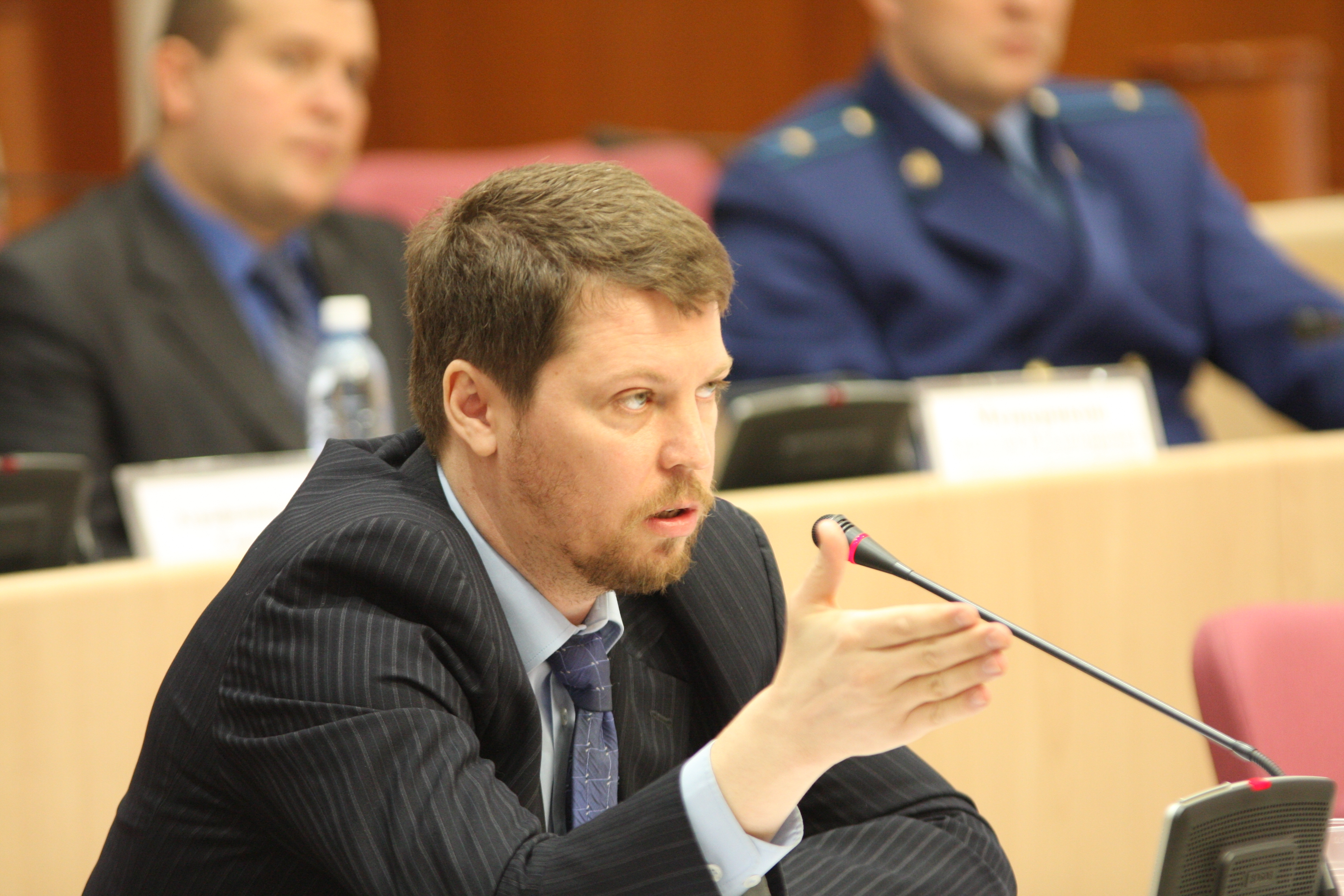
- Matveyev in 2011

Member of the State Duma for Samara Oblast
- Incumbent
- Assumed office 12 October 2021
- Preceded by: Igor Stankevich
- Constituency: Promyshlenny (No. 162)

Personal details
- Born: 13 May 1968 (age 58) Dnipropetrovsk, Ukrainian SSR, Soviet Union
- Party: Communist Party of the Russian Federation
- Education: Samara State University

Mikhail Nikolaevich Matveyev (Russian: Михаил Николаевич Матвеев, born 13 May 1968) is a Russian politician and historian. A member of the Communist Party, Matveyev represents the Promyshlenny constituency in the State Duma.

== Education ==
In 1992, Matveyev graduated with honors at Samara State University.

== Political career ==
He was elected to the State Duma in the Promyshlenny constituency in the 2021 Russian legislative election after a recount and legal challenge. In February 2022, Matveyev voted in favor of the recognition of the separatist Donetsk and Luhansk People's Republics but later spoke out against the "special military operation", stating that he had not intended the recognition to precede an offensive war.

"I voted for peace, not for war. I wanted Russia to become a shield so that Donbas would not be bombed, not for Kyiv to be bombed."

In 2022, he officially supported the state-promoted narrative that Ukraine is governed by Banderites and "neo-Nazis", and his only criticism concerned military operations outside the Donbas.

On 12 September 2022, Matveyev proposed that Russian governors and lawmakers enlist in the Russian army as volunteers.

On 18 July 2024, Matveyev was injured in what authorities described was an "attempted murder" in Samara, with Matveyev saying that he was assaulted by migrants when he tried to prevent them from assaulting a passerby. Three people were arrested over the incident.
