= Smyshlyayevka =

Smyshlyayevka Смышляевка
- Urban-type settlement
- Flag
- Interactive map of Smyshlyayevka
- Location of Smyshlyayevka Smyshlyayevka (Samara Oblast)
- Coordinates: 53.2501°N 50.4005°E
- Country: Russia
- Federal subject: Samara Oblast
- Administrative district: Volzhsky District
- Elevation: 40 m (130 ft)

Population (2010 Census)
  - Total: 6,756
  - Estimate (2021): 7,958 (+17.8%)
- Time zone: UTC+4 (MSK+1)
- Postal code: 443548
- OKTMO ID: 36614157051

Smyshlyayevka (Russian: Смышляевка) is an urban locality (an urban-type settlement) in Volzhsky District of Samara Oblast, Russia. Population: 6,756 (2010 census); 5,954 (2002 census); 13,469 (1989 Soviet census).
