= Chelno-Vershiny =

Rural locality in Samara Oblast, Russia

Coordinates: 54°25′03″N 51°05′19″E

Chelno-Vershiny (Russian: Челно-Вершины) is a rural locality (a selo) and the administrative center of Chelno-Vershinsky District, Samara Oblast, Russia. Population: 5,747 (2010 census); 6,062 (2002 census); 6,531 (1989 Soviet census).
