= Viktor Kazakov (politician) =

Russian politician (born 1949)

- Виктор Казаков
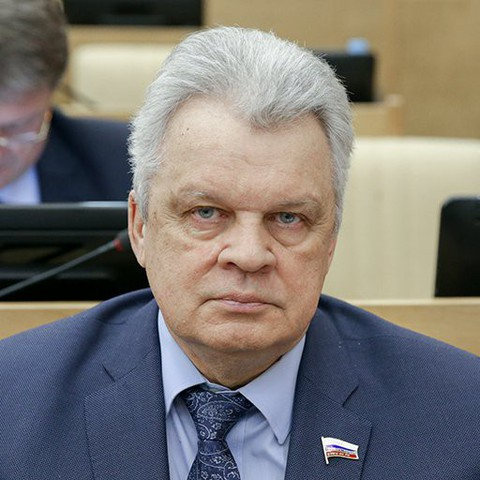

Member of the State Duma for Samara Oblast
- Incumbent
- Assumed office 5 October 2016
- Preceded by: constituency established
- Constituency: Krasnoglinsky (No. 160)
- In office 29 December 2003 – 24 December 2007
- Preceded by: Valentin Romanov
- Succeeded by: constituencies abolished
- Constituency: Novokuybyshevsk (No. 151)

Member of the State Duma (Party List Seat)
- In office 24 December 2007 – 5 October 2016

Personal details
- Born: 4 April 1949 (age 77) Fergana, Uzbek SSR, USSR
- Party: United Russia
- Education: Samara State Technical University

Viktor Alexeyevich Kazakov (Russian: Виктор Алексеевич Казаков; born 4 April 1949 in Fergana, Uzbek SSR) is a Russian political figure and deputy of the 4th, 5th, 6th, 7th, and 8th State Dumas.

In 1989, Kazakov started working as the chief engineer and Deputy General Director of the Kuibyshevneft. In 1995, he was the First Vice President of Yukos Oil Company. In 1998, he was appointed vice president of the oil company YUKSI – a result of the merger of Yukos and Sibneft. However, the merger was soon annulated, and Kazakov became a board member of directors of the Eastern Oil Company. In July 2003, he was appointed First Vice-Governor of Samara Oblast. In 2003 he was elected deputy of the 4th State Duma. In 2007, 2011, 2016, and 2021, he was re-elected to the 4th, 5th, 6th, 7th, and 8th State Dumas from the Samara Oblast constituency.

In 2016, Kazakov appeared on the list of potential recipients of a bribe in the amount of $2 billion in the Yukos shareholders v. Russia case. According to the case files, Yukos shareholders (among which was Kazakov) made payments to government officials who helped acquire the company's shares.

In 2018, as a deputy of the State Duma, he voted in favor of raising the retirement age.

At the 2021 State Duma elections, during the United Russia party congress on 19 June, he was again nominated as a candidate for the State Duma from the Krasnoglinsky single-mandate electoral district No. 160 in Samara.

== Sanctions ==
He was sanctioned by the UK government in 2022 in relation to the Russo-Ukrainian War.
