= Koshki, Samara Oblast =

Rural locality in Samara Oblast, Russia

Coordinates: 54°12′16″N 50°28′01″E

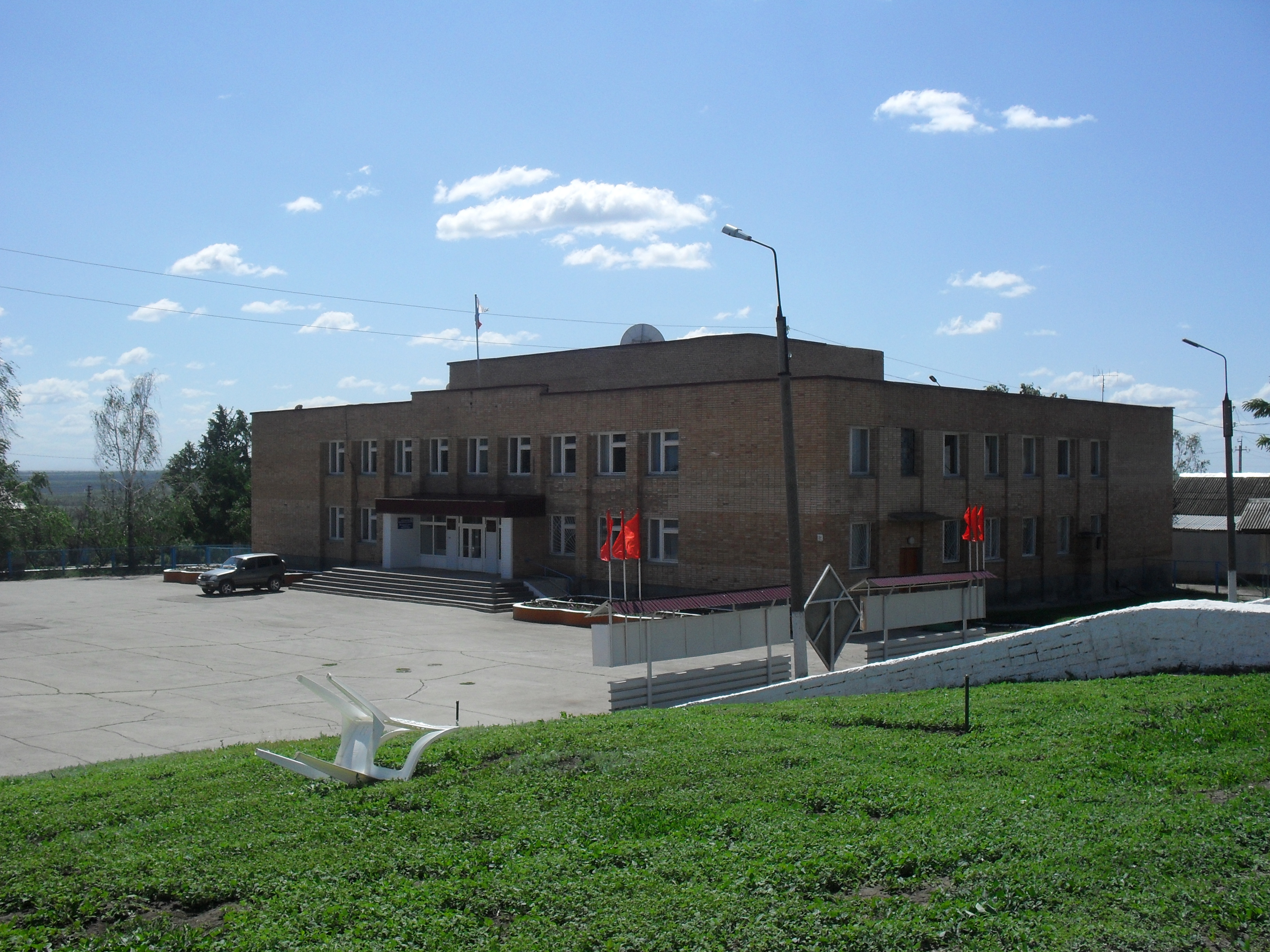
Municipal office

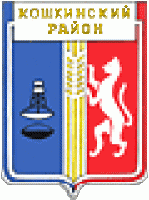
Coat of arms of Koshki

Koshki (Russian: Ко́шки, Chuvash: Кушакъел) is a rural locality (a selo) and the administrative center of Koshkinsky District, Samara Oblast, Russia. Population: 7,969 (2010 census); 8,149 (2002 census); 7,352 (1989 Soviet census).
