= Promyshlenny City District, Samara =

Promyshlenny City District Промышленный район (Russian)
- District
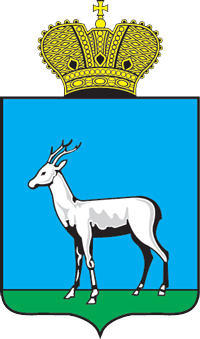
- Coat of arms

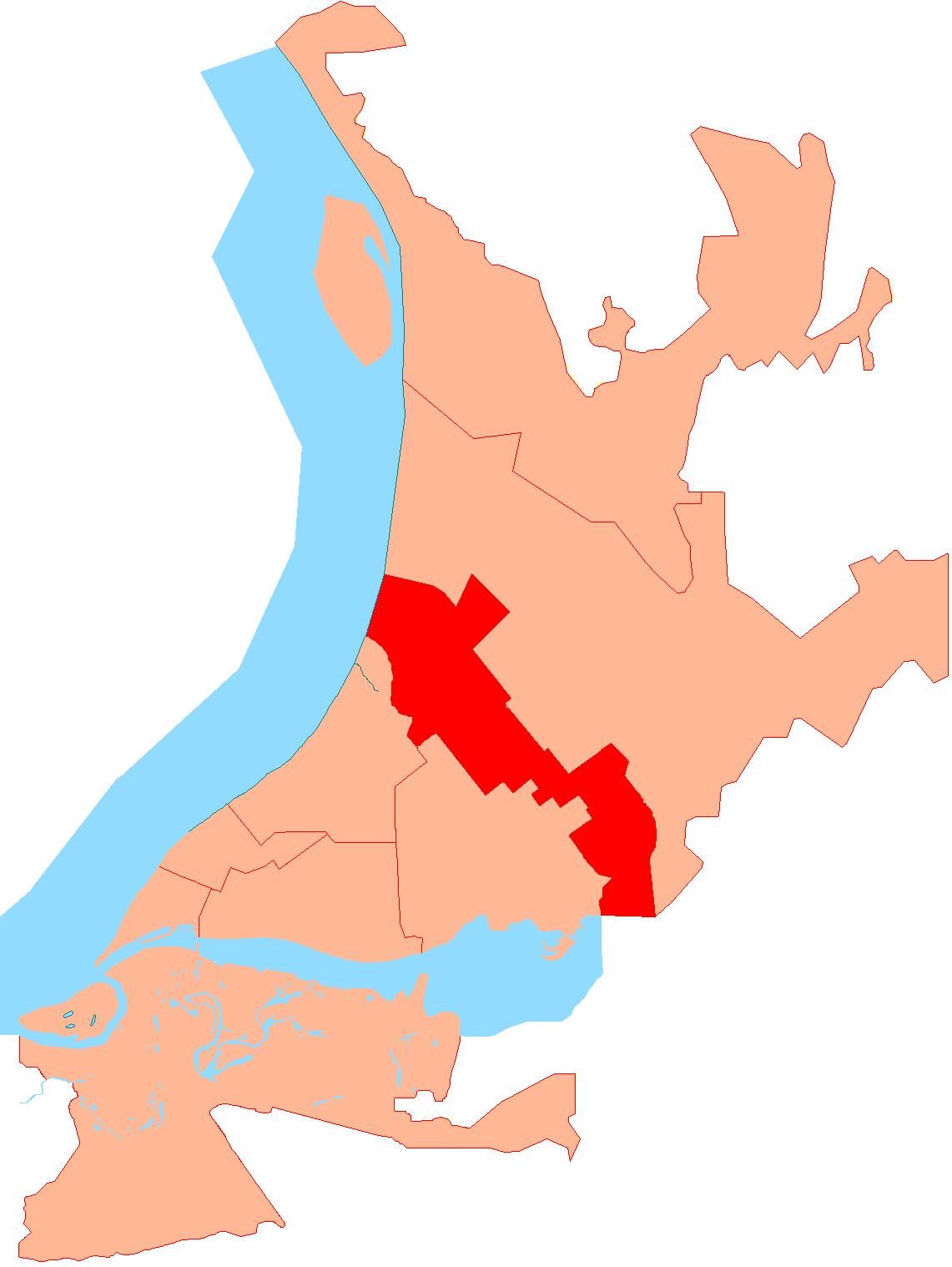
- Location of Promyshlenny City District on the map of Samara
- Coordinates: 53°15′47″N 50°11′55″E
- Country: Russia
- Federal subject: Samara Oblast
- Established: 5 April 1978
- Administrative center: Samara

Area
  - Total: 48.6 km^{2} (18.8 sq mi)
- Time zone: UTC+4 (MSK+1)
- OKTMO ID: 36701335

Promyshlenny City District (Russian: Промышленный район) is a district (raion) of the city of Samara, Samara Oblast, Russia. Population: 273,126 (2010 Census); 271,554 (2002 Census); 285,469 (1989 Soviet census).
