= Anapa railway station =

Railway station in Verhnee Dzhemete, Russia

Anapa
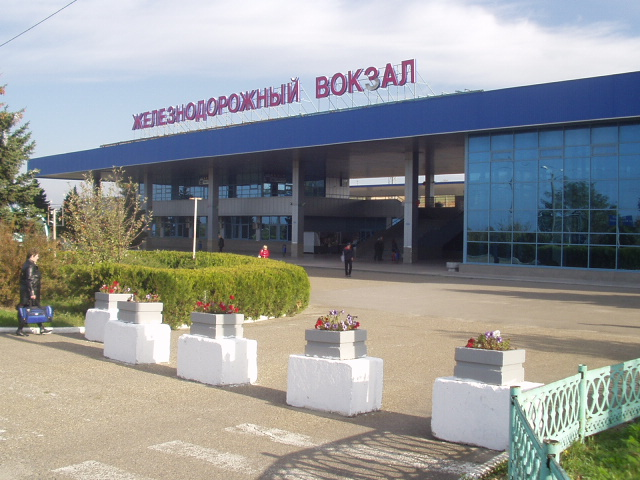

General information
- Location: Russia
- Coordinates: 44.9505°N 37.3184°E
- Platforms: 2
- Tracks: 10

Other information
- Classification: 1

History
- Opened: 1978
- Electrified: 2019
Location

Anapa (Russian: Ана́па) is a train station in the Krasnodar region of the North Caucasian Railway. It is located in the village of Verkhneye Dzhemete in the Anapsky district of Krasnodar Krai. It is part of the Krasnodar Center for the Organization of Railway Station Operations DCS-2 of the North Caucasus Traffic Management Directorate. In terms of work volume, the station is classified as Class 1.

== History ==
In July 2014, as part of the Smart Station project, commissioning work on an intelligent, energy-efficient LED lighting system was completed at the Anapa station.

Commuter service between Anapa and Kerch has been there since March 7, 2020. Two RA2 rail buses operate between the cities.

Since August 1, 2020, service was launched between Anapa and Greater Sochi via Krasnodar on comfortable Lastochka electric trains.

== Long-distance trains ==
TEP70BS-143 with train 011Э Anapa - Moscow in 2015

In May 2024, it was planned to launch train service on the Anapa-Temryuk route, but in the end the launch was not carried out.
