= U-Piter =

Russian rock band

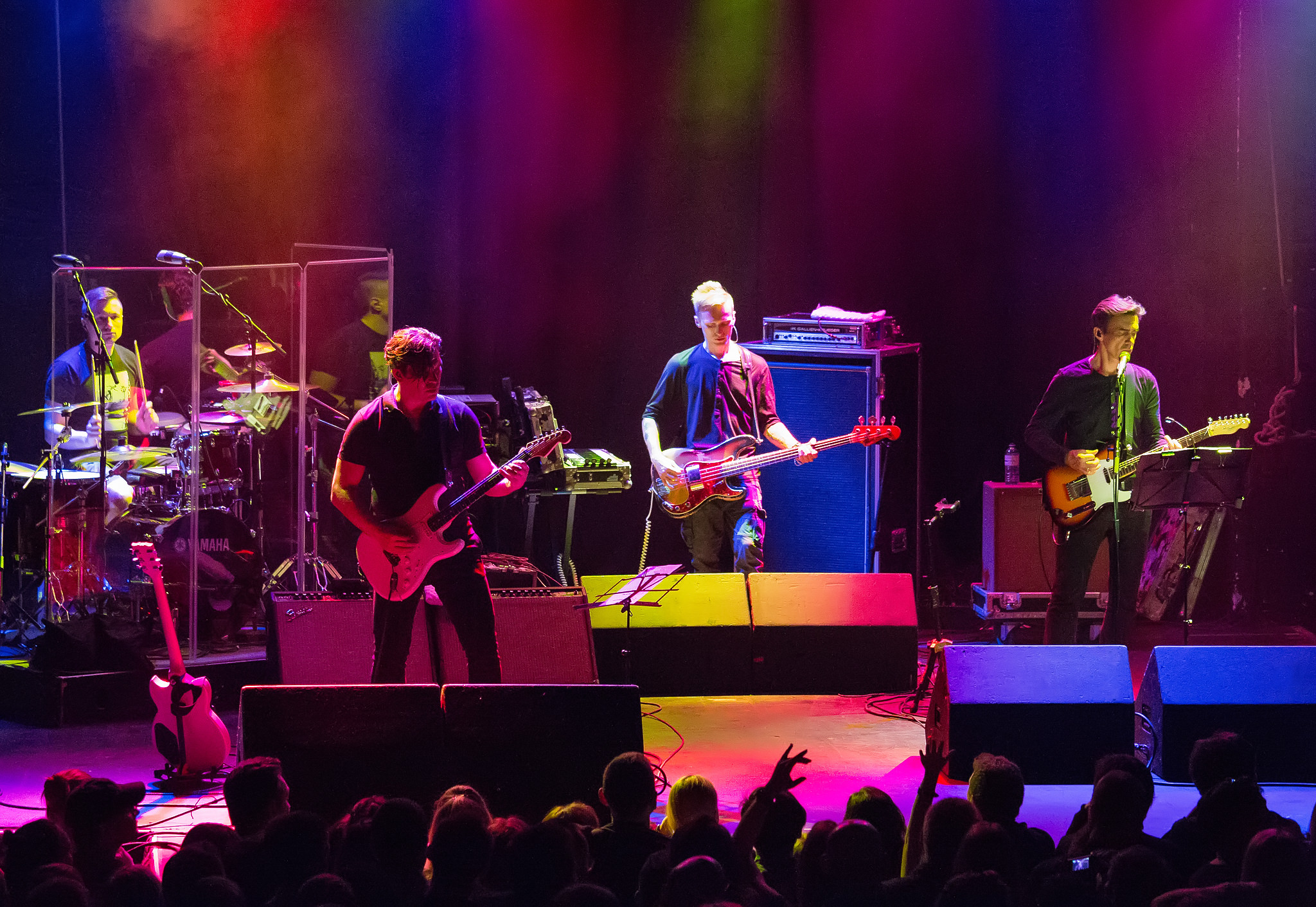
- Toronto (June 2016)

Background information
- Origin: Saint Petersburg, Russia
- Genres: Russian rock Post-punk; Progressive rock Alternative rock Art rock Gothic rock
- Years active: 2001 – 2017
- Label: Nikitin
- Members: Vyacheslav Butusov; Yuri Kasparyan; Yevgeny Kulakov; Aleksey Andreev
- Past members: Oleg Sakmarov; Sergey Vyrvich

U-Piter (Russian: Ю-Питер) was a Russian rock band from Saint-Petersburg. The group was formed by Vyacheslav Butusov in 2001. The group disbanded in 2017.

== History ==
The band was formed on October 11, 2001, with the original members being Vyacheslav Butusov (former lead singer of Nautilus Pompilius), Yuri Kasparyan (former lead guitarist of Kino), Oleg Sakmarov (former member of Aquarium and Kolibri) and Evgeny Kulakov. The band's namesake was the Roman god Jupiter, though they often stylized their name in a mix of Cyrillic and Greek letters: Ю-πиτΣρ (see: pi, tau, sigma, rho).

U-Piter released their first single in November 2001, "Udarnaya lyubov'" (Russian: "Ударная любовь").

They released their first album, Name of Rivers (Russian: Имя рек) in March 2003, consisting of 11 songs written by Butusov. The title of the album also is a play on the term "имярек", which is a placeholder name often traditionally used in Church Slavonic liturgical texts and old Slavic documents as a placeholder for a person's name. In the same year, they participated in a tribute album of the Russian rock band Piknik with the track "Surgi i lurgi" (Russian: "Сурги и лурги").

During June through August of 2004, the group released their second album, Biografika (Russian: Биографика), of which some tracks - including "Devushka po gorodu" (Russian: "Девушка по городу") and "Pesnya iduschevo domoi" (Russian: "Песня идущего домой") - saw significant radio play.

In 2008, Sergei Vyrvich joined the line-up as a bass guitarist. In the same year, they released their third album, Bogomol (Russian: Богомол), in addition to a tribute album for Nautilus Pompilius.

In June of 2010, they released their fourth album, Tsvety i ternii (Russian: Цветы и тернии), which included the track Deti minut (Russian: Дети минут). The track appeared in the soundtrack for the movie Игла Remix. The lyrics were taken from a poem written by the lead singer of Kino, Viktor Tsoi.

In 2015, the group released their fifth and last album, Gudgora (Russian: Гудгора).

The group split in February 2017, after a music tour through Siberia and Ural.

== Members ==
=== Final line-up ===
- Vyacheslav Butusov (Russian: Вячеслав Бутусов) - lead vocals, guitar
- Yuri Kasparyan (Russian: Юрий Каспарян) - guitar
- Yevgeny Kulakov (Russian: Евгений Кулаков) - drums
- Aleksey Andreyev (Russian: Алексей Андреев) - bass guitar, keyboards, guitar

=== Former members ===
- Oleg Sakmarov (Russian: Олег Сакмаров) - keyboards, wind instruments
- Sergey Vyrvich (Russian: Сергей Вырвич) - bass guitar

== Discography ==
Year	Russian name	English transliteration (translation)
2003	Имя рек	Imya Rek (A pun on the Church Slavonic "Imyarek" — a placeholder for a person's name, similar to "John Doe", and the literal "Name of Rivers")
2004	Биографика	Biografika (Biographica)
2008	Богомол	Bogomol (Mantis)
2010	Цветы и тернии	Tsvety i ternii (Flowers and thorns)
2015	Гудгора	Gudgora
