= Novorossiysk railway station =

Railway station in Novorossiysk, Krasnodar Krai, Russia

Novorossiysk Новороссийск
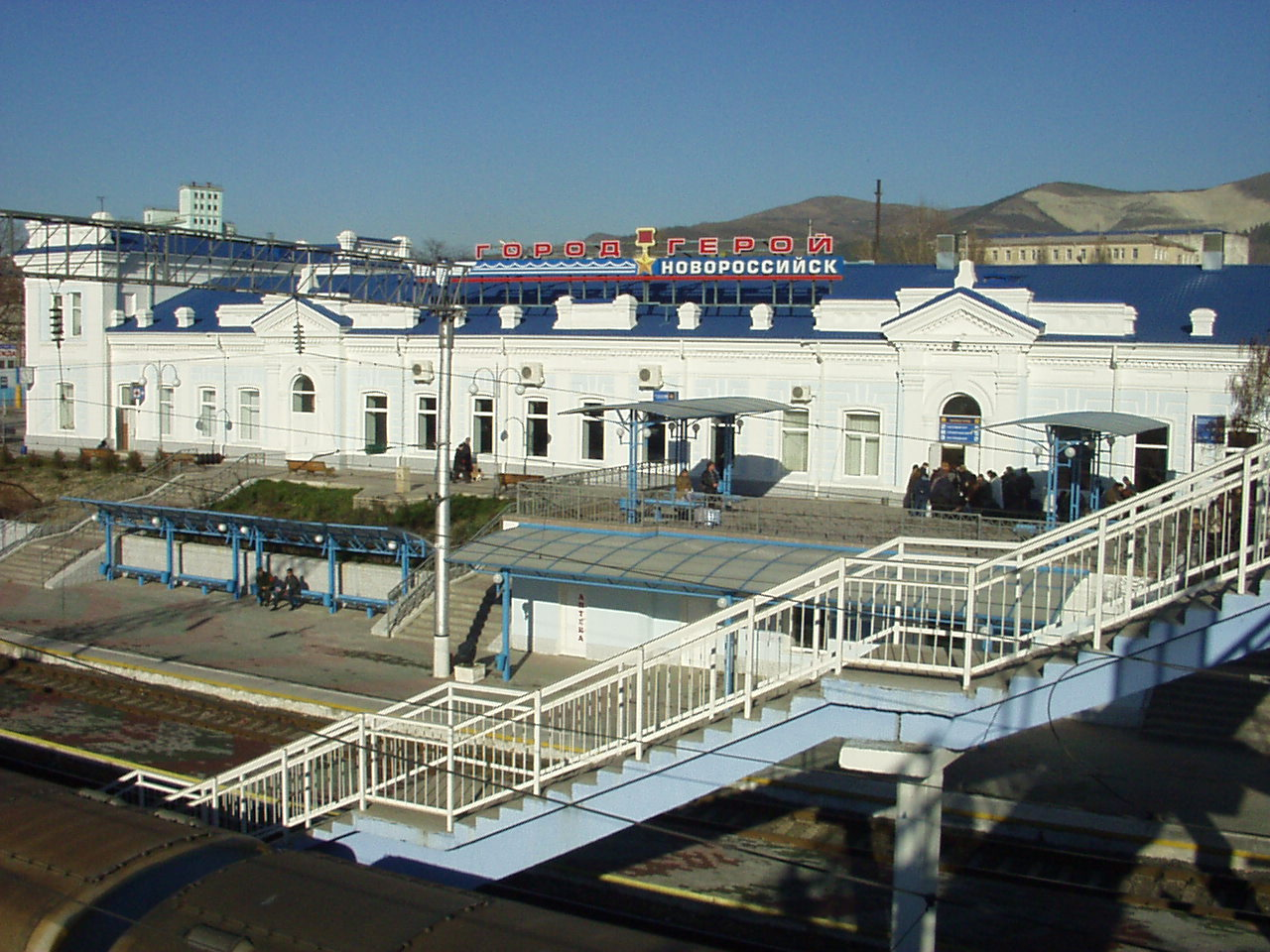
- View of the station from the bridge in 2005

General information
- Location: Novorossiysk; Russia
- Coordinates: 44.7360°N 37.7729°E
- System: North Caucasus Railway terminal
- Owner: Russian Railways
- Platforms: 3 (2 island platforms)
- Tracks: 5

Construction
- Parking: yes

Other information
- Station code: 520901
- Fare zone: 14

History
- Opened: 1889

Services
Preceding station	North Caucasus Railway	Following station
Location

Novorossiysk Railway station (Russian: Новороссийск) is a railway station in Novorossiysk, Krasnodar Krai, Russia.

== History ==
Novorossiysk station was opened in 1889, and in 1898 a railway passenger terminal was built. The railway station in the port of Novorossiysk was built in 1895, immediately after the arrival here of steel the path of the former at the time of the Vladikavkaz Railway.

It was destroyed, but completely restored after the Great Patriotic War, it has not lost its unique architectural beauty and figure of merit, whereby to this day, a monument of architecture of national importance.

== Trains ==
The trains from this station go to almost any city in Russia, although most trains go to the capital of Russia — Moscow.

- Krasnodar — Novorossiysk
- Moscow — Novorossiysk
- St.Petersburg — Novorossiysk
- Perm — Novorossiysk
- Nizhny Novgorod — Novorossiysk
- Vladikavkaz — Novorossiysk
- Samara — Novorossiysk
