= Klyavlino (rural locality) =

Rural locality in Samara Oblast, Russia

Coordinates: 54°15′44″N 52°01′34″E

Klyavlino (Russian: Клявлино) is a rural locality (a railway station) and the administrative center of Klyavlinsky District, Samara Oblast, Russia. Population: 6,967 (2010 census); 6,367 (2002 census); 6,625 (1989 Soviet census).
