= Kamyshla, Samara Oblast =

Rural locality in Samara Oblast, Russia

Coordinates: 54°06′47″N 52°08′34″E

Kamyshla (Russian: Камышла) is a rural locality (a selo) and the administrative center of Kamyshlinsky District, Samara Oblast, Russia. Population: 4,889 (2010 census); 4,826 (2002 census);
