= Petra Dubrava =

Petra Dubrava Петра Дубрава
- Urban-type settlement
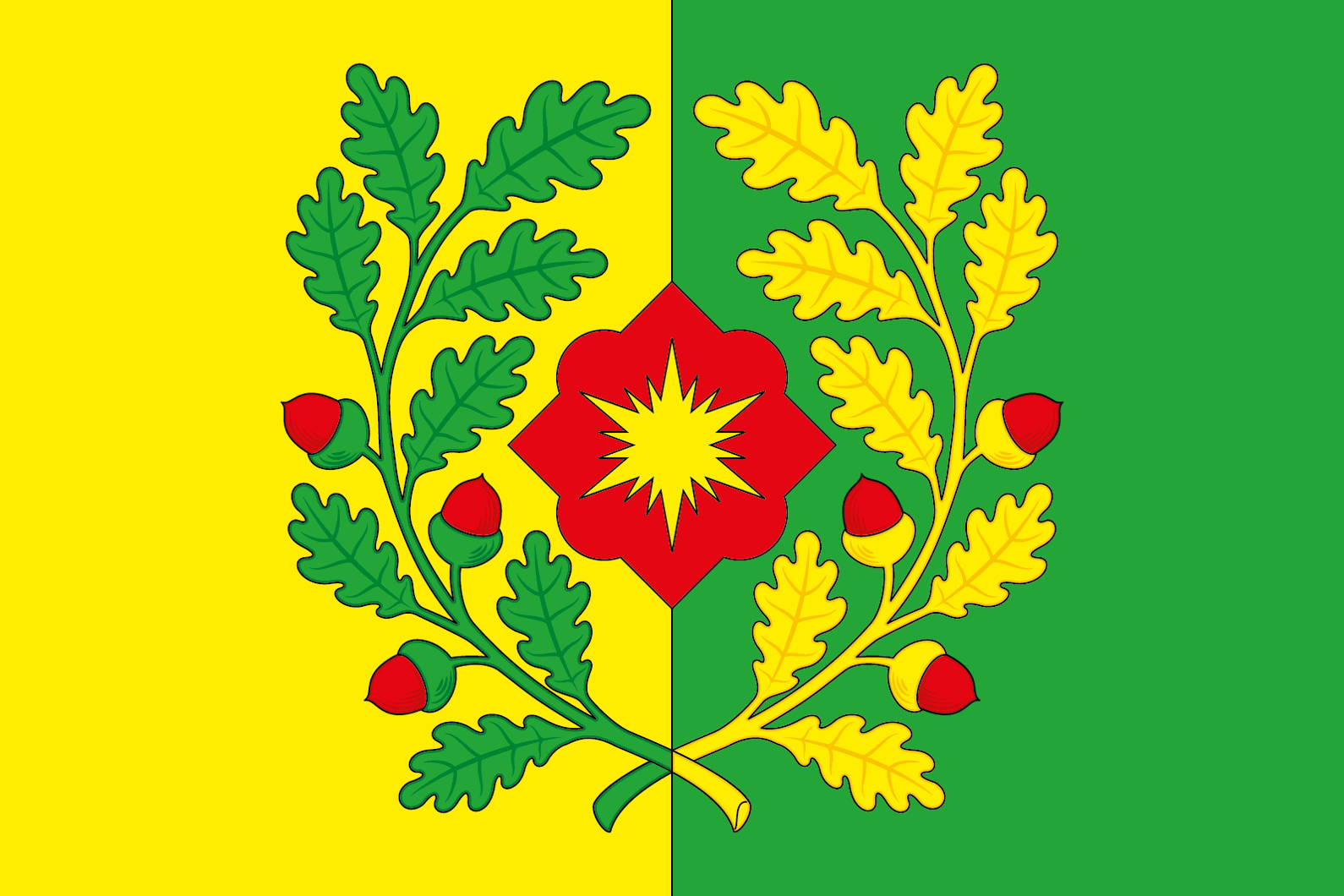
- Flag
- Interactive map of Petra Dubrava
- Location of Petra Dubrava Petra Dubrava (Samara Oblast)
- Coordinates: 53.2946°N 50.3654°E
- Country: Russia
- Federal subject: Samara Oblast
- Administrative district: Volzhsky District
- Founded: 1942
- Elevation: 144 m (472 ft)

Population (2010 Census)
  - Total: 6,453
  - Estimate (2021): 6,713 (+4%)
- Time zone: UTC+4 (MSK+1)
- Postal code: 443546
- OKTMO ID: 36614155051

Petra Dubrava (Russian: Петра Дубрава) is an urban locality (an urban-type settlement) in Volzhsky District of Samara Oblast, Russia. The locality has a population of 6,453 (2010 census); .
