= Sovetsky City District, Samara =

Sovetsky City District Советский район (Russian)
- District
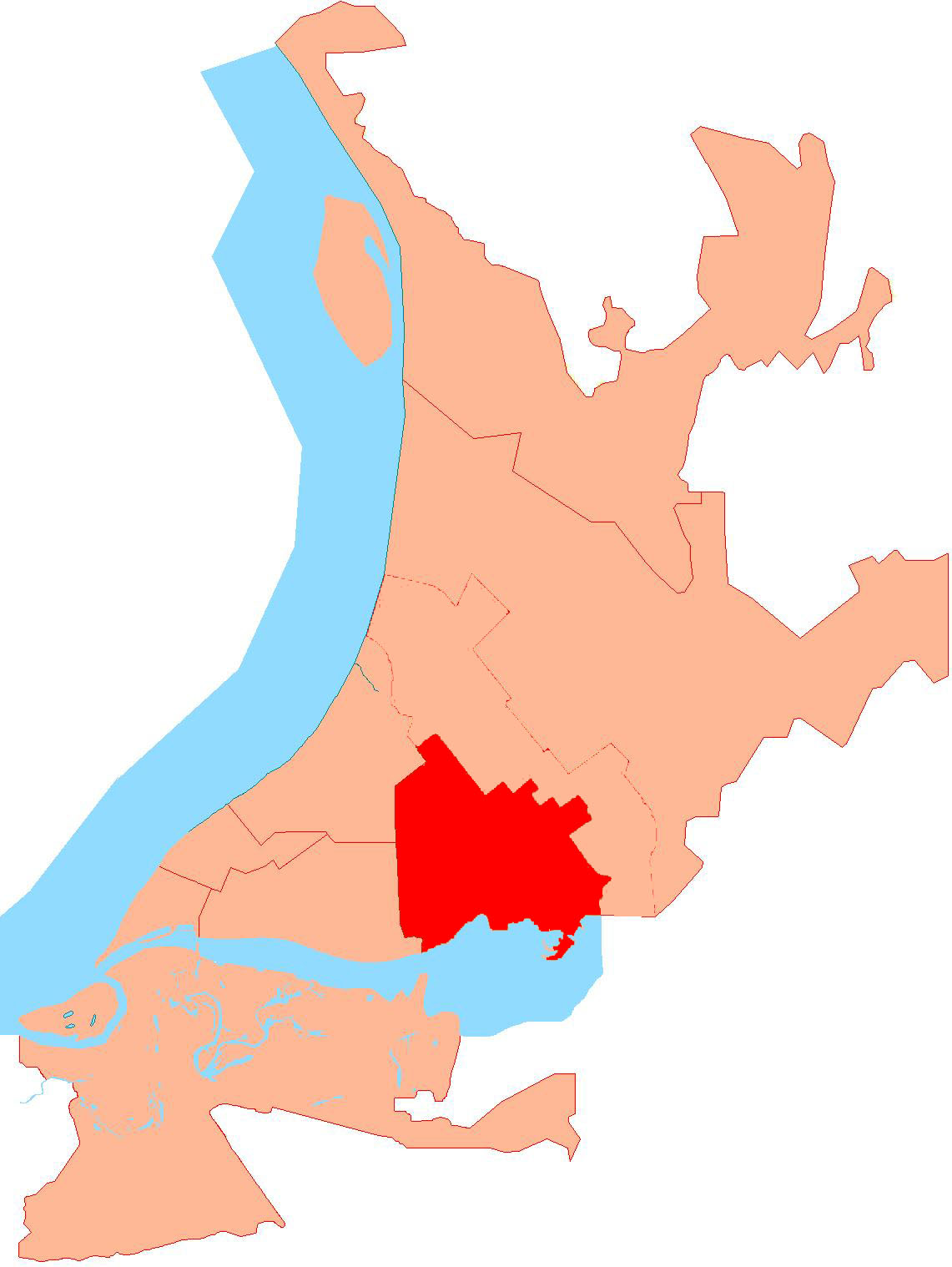
- Location of Sovetsky City District on the map of Samara
- Coordinates: 53°11′30.37″N 50°10′42.28″E
- Country: Russia
- Federal subject: Samara Oblast
- Established: 28 August 1939
- Administrative center: Samara

Area
  - Total: 48.5 km^{2} (18.7 sq mi)
- Time zone: UTC+4 (MSK+1)
- OKTMO ID: 36701345

Sovetsky City District (Russian: Советский район) is a district (raion) of the city of Samara, Samara Oblast, Russia. Population: 177,403 (2010 Census); 181,895 (2002 Census); 191,896 (1989 Soviet census).
