= Kirovsky City District, Samara =

Kirovsky City District Кировский район (Russian)
- District
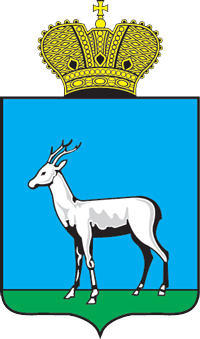
- Coat of arms

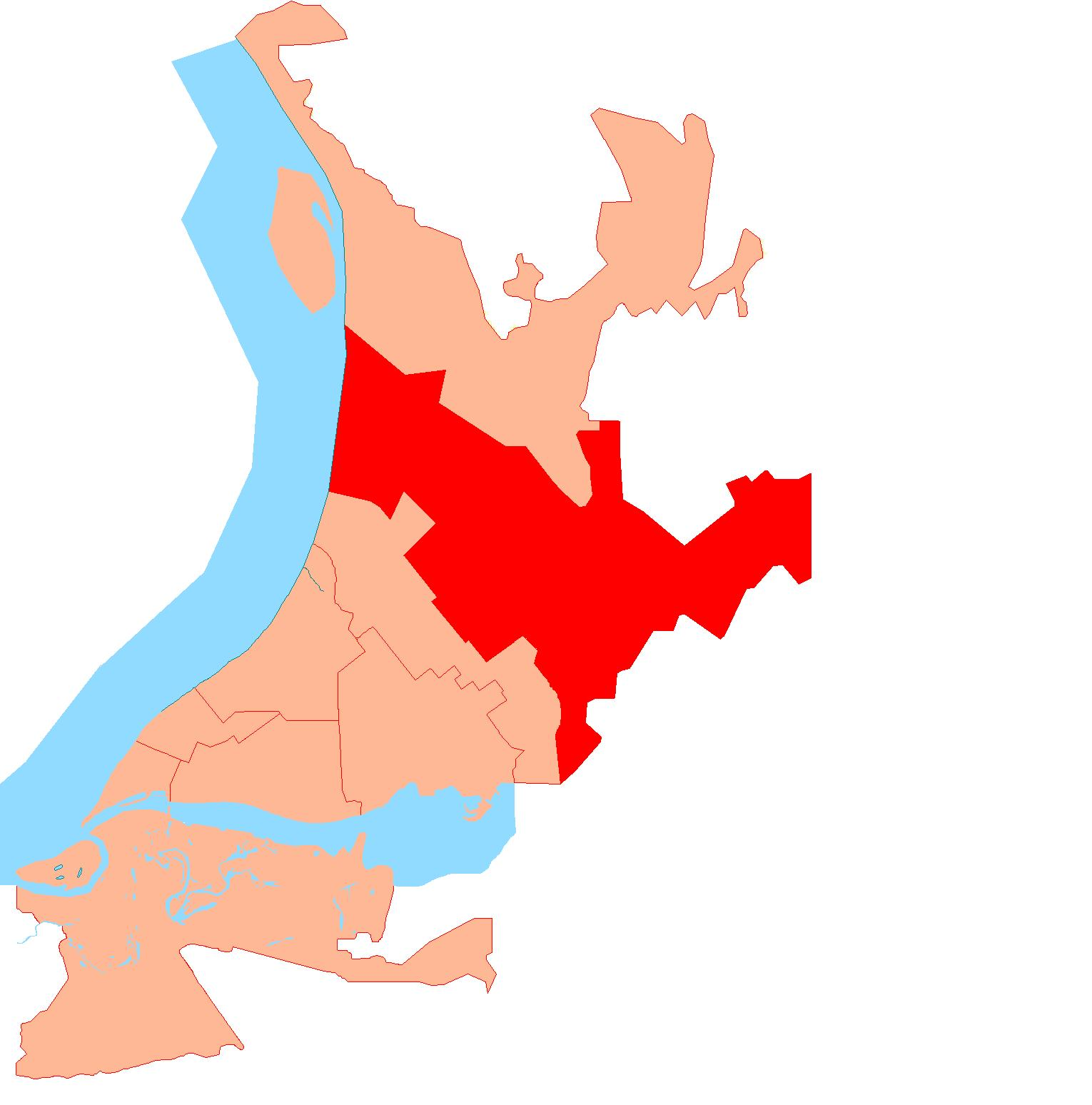
- Location of Kirovsky City District on the map of Samara
- Coordinates: 53°13′12″N 50°15′0″E
- Country: Russia
- Federal subject: Samara Oblast
- Established: 13 March 1942
- Administrative center: Samara

Area
  - Total: 87.5 km^{2} (33.8 sq mi)
- Time zone: UTC+4 (MSK+1)
- OKTMO ID: 36701310

Kirovsky City District (Russian: Кировский район) is a district (raion) of the city of Samara, Samara Oblast, Russia. Population: 228,907 (2010 Census); 235,846 (2002 Census); 262,065 (1989 Soviet census).
