= Novokuybyshevsk =

City in Samara Oblast, Russia

Novokuybyshevsk Новокуйбышевск
- City
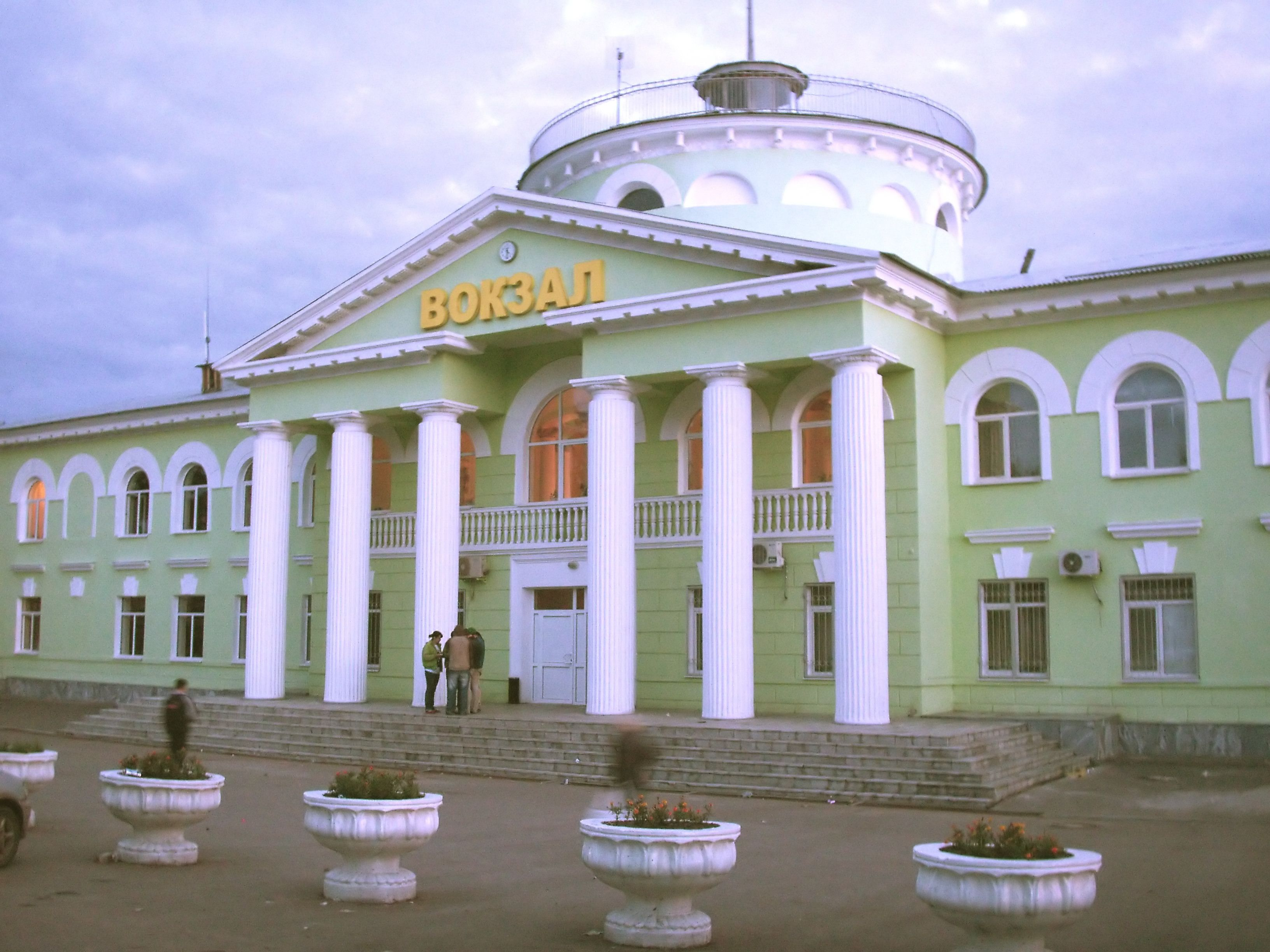

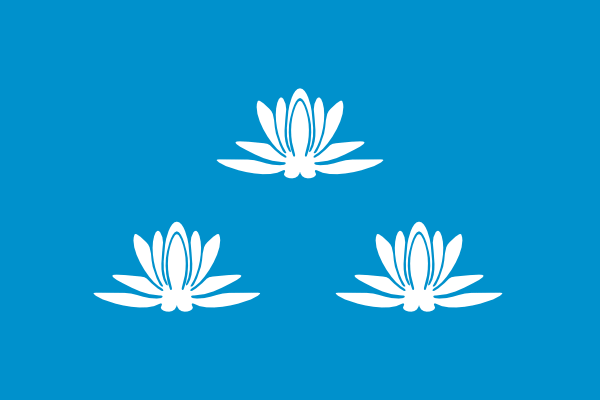
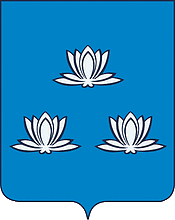
- Flag Coat of arms
- Interactive map of Novokuybyshevsk
- Location of Novokuybyshevsk Novokuybyshevsk (Samara Oblast)
- Coordinates: 53°06′N 49°56′E
- Country: Russia
- Federal subject: Samara Oblast
- Founded: 1946
- City status since: February 22, 1952

Government
  - Head: Alexey Korobkov
- Elevation: 90 m (300 ft)

Population (2010 Census)
  - Total: 108,438
  - Estimate (2025): 95,862 (−11.6%)
  - Rank: 150th in 2010

Administrative status
  - Subordinated to: city of oblast significance of Novokuybyshevsk
  - Capital of: city of oblast significance of Novokuybyshevsk

Municipal status
  - Urban okrug: Novokuybyshevsk Urban Okrug
  - Capital of: Novokuybyshevsk Urban Okrug
- Time zone: UTC+4 (MSK+1)
- Postal code: 446200
- OKTMO ID: 36713000001

Novokuybyshevsk (Russian: Новоку́йбышевск) is a city in Samara Oblast, Russia, located on the eastern bank of the Volga River, 6 kilometers (3.7 mi) away from it. Population: 108,438 (2010 census); 112,973 (2002 census); 112,987 (1989 Soviet census).

During the Russian Civil War, the area where the city now stands was a place of ferocious battles with the White Russians.

On February 22, 1952, following the decision of the Presidium of the Supreme Soviet of the RSFSR, Novo-Kuybyshev was granted town status and renamed Novokuybyshevsk. The name means "New Kuybyshev", Kuybyshev being the name of the nearby city of Samara from 1935 until 1991.

== Administrative and municipal status ==
Within the framework of administrative divisions, it is, together with seven rural localities, incorporated as the city of oblast significance of Novokuybyshevsk—an administrative unit with the status equal to that of the districts. As a municipal division, the city of oblast significance of Novokuybyshevsk is incorporated as Novokuybyshevsk Urban Okrug.

== Novokuybyshevsk Oil Refinery ==
In 1946, shortly after World War II, the Soviets constructed an oil refinery in Novokuybyshevsk, which resulted in the establishment of a large village of approximately 14,000 people. The location soon turned out to be so advantageous that the government decided to develop the village into a major industrial center.

In March 2024, Russia claimed that a drone strike was prevented when they intercepted a drone over the Novokuibyshevsk refinery. On 10 March 2025, Ukrainian drones struck the oil refinery. Locals reported several explosions in the city. The refinery was further attacked by Ukrainian drones on 2 August, that year. On 20 September 2025, according to the SHOT channel, five explosions occurred at the refinery. Locals recorded footage of a fire at the refinery, while the pumping stations, on the Kuibyshev-Tikhoretsk pipeline, were also attacked. On 2 January, the following year, Ukrainian drones struck the facility once again. Another drone attack struck on 18 April with Russian Telegram channels reporting a large fire at the oil refinery.

== Notable residents ==
- Violetta Khrapina Bida (born 1994), Olympic épée fencer
