= Krasnoglinsky City District =

Coordinates: 53.3000°N 50.2833°E

Krasnoglinsky City District (Russian: Красноглинский район) is a district (raion) of the city of Samara, Samara Oblast, Russia. Population: 85,566 (2010 Census); 68,746 (2002 Census); 71,230 (1989 Soviet census).

There is a ski resort in the city district (SOK Krasnaya Glinka).
