= Pokhvistnevsky District =

Pokhvistnevsky District Похвистневский район (Russian)
- District
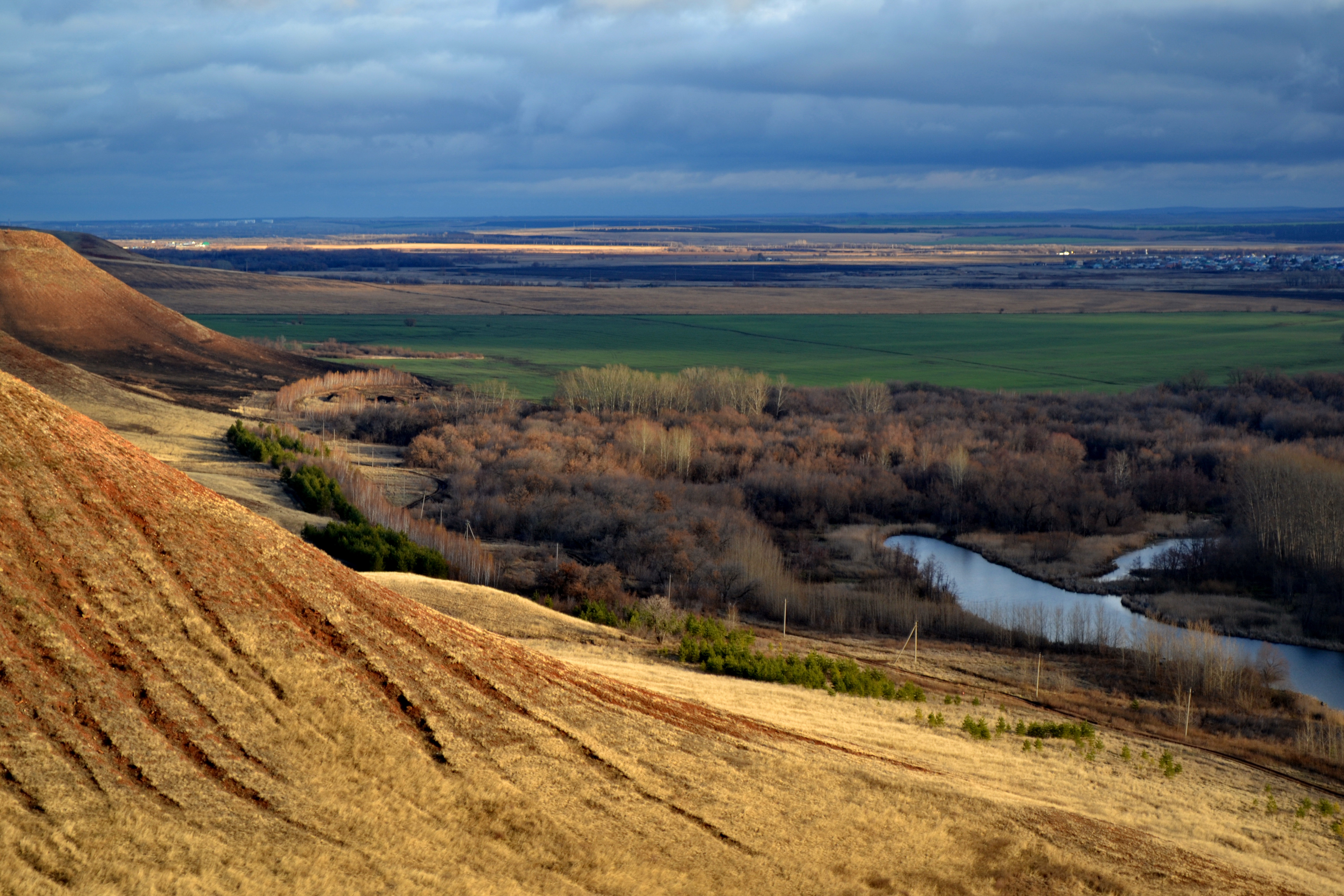
- Kopek Mountain, Pokhvistnevsky District

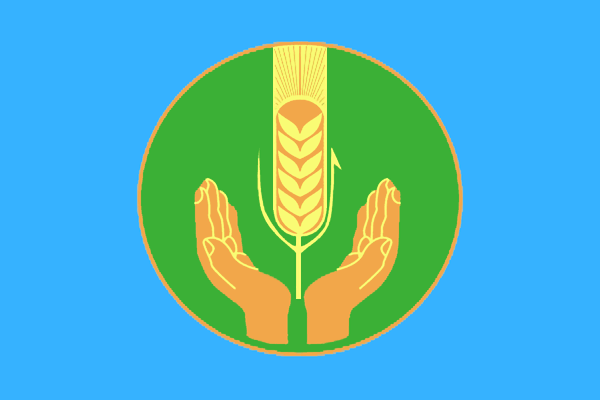
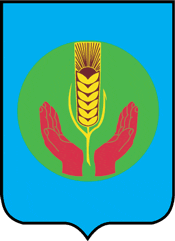
- Flag Coat of arms
- Location of Pokhvistnevsky District in Samara Oblast
- Coordinates: 53°39′N 52°08′E
- Country: Russia
- Federal subject: Samara Oblast
- Established: 6 December 1929
- Administrative center: Pokhvistnevo

Area
  - Total: 2,130 km^{2} (820 sq mi)

Population (2010 Census)
  - Total: 29,027
  - Density: 13.6/km^{2} (35.3/sq mi)
  - Urban: 0%
  - Rural: 100%

Administrative structure
  - Inhabited localities: 79 rural localities

Municipal structure
  - Municipally incorporated as: Pokhvistnevsky Municipal District
  - Municipal divisions: 0 urban settlements, 15 rural settlements
- Time zone: UTC+4 (MSK+1)
- OKTMO ID: 36634000
- Website: http://www.pohr.ru/

Pokhvistnevsky District (Russian: По́хвистневский райо́н) is an administrative and municipal district (raion), one of the twenty-seven in Samara Oblast, Russia. It is located in the northeast of the oblast. The area of the district is 2,130 square kilometers (820 sq mi). Its administrative center is the town of Pokhvistnevo (which is not administratively a part of the district). Population: 29,027 (2010 Census); 30,180 (2002 census); 32,437 (1989 Soviet census).

== Administrative and municipal status ==
Within the framework of administrative divisions, Pokhvistnevsky District is one of the twenty-seven in the oblast. The town of Pokhvistnevo serves as its administrative center, despite being incorporated separately as a town of oblast significance—an administrative unit with the status equal to that of the districts.

As a municipal division, the district is incorporated as Pokhvistnevsky Municipal District. The town of oblast significance of Pokhvistnevo is incorporated separately from the district as Pokhvistnevo Urban Okrug.
