= Chelno-Vershinsky District =

Chelno-Vershinsky District Челно-Вершинский район
- District
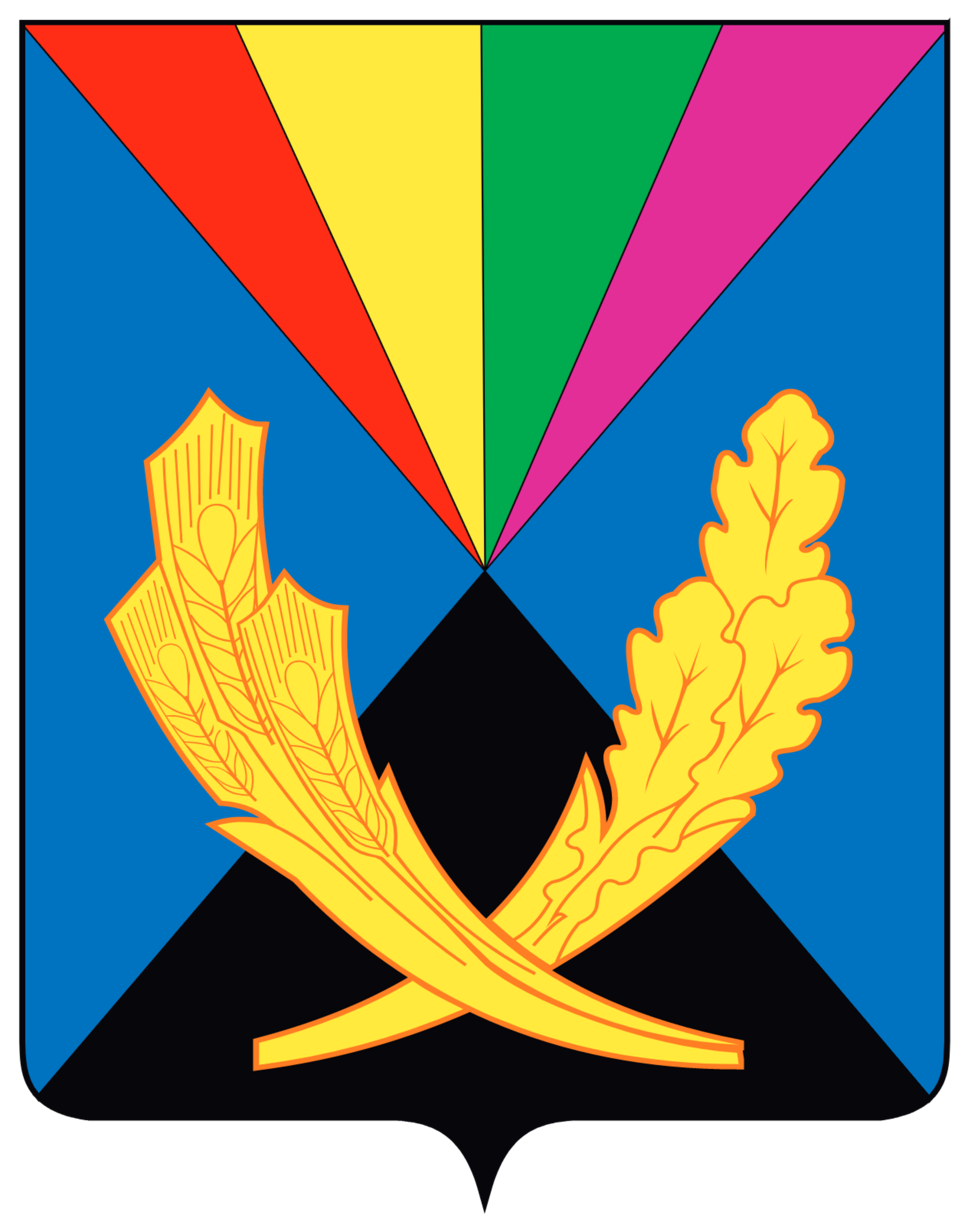
- Flag Coat of arms
- Location of Chelno-Vershinsky District in Samara Oblast
- Coordinates: 54°24′58″N 51°05′20″E
- Country: Russia
- Federal subject: Samara Oblast
- Established: 16 July 1928
- Administrative center: Chelno-Vershiny

Area
  - Total: 1,162 km^{2} (449 sq mi)

Population (2010 Census)
  - Total: 16,954
  - Density: 14.59/km^{2} (37.79/sq mi)
  - Urban: 0%
  - Rural: 100%

Administrative structure
  - Inhabited localities: 53 rural localities

Municipal structure
  - Municipally incorporated as: Chelno-Vershinsky Municipal District
  - Municipal divisions: 0 urban settlements, 11 rural settlements
- Time zone: UTC+4 (MSK+1)
- OKTMO ID: 36646000
- Website: http://челно-вершины.рф/

Chelno-Vershinsky District (Russian: Челно́-Верши́нский райо́н) is an administrative and municipal district (raion), one of the twenty-seven in Samara Oblast, Russia. It is located in the north of the oblast. The area of the district is 1,162 square kilometers (449 sq mi). Its administrative center is the rural locality (a selo) of Chelno-Vershiny. Population: 16,954 (2010 Census); 18,817 (2002 Census); 21,826 (1989 Soviet census). The population of Chelno-Vershiny accounts for 33.9% of the district's total population.
