= Kamyshlinsky District =

Kamyshlinsky District Камышлинский район (Russian)
- District
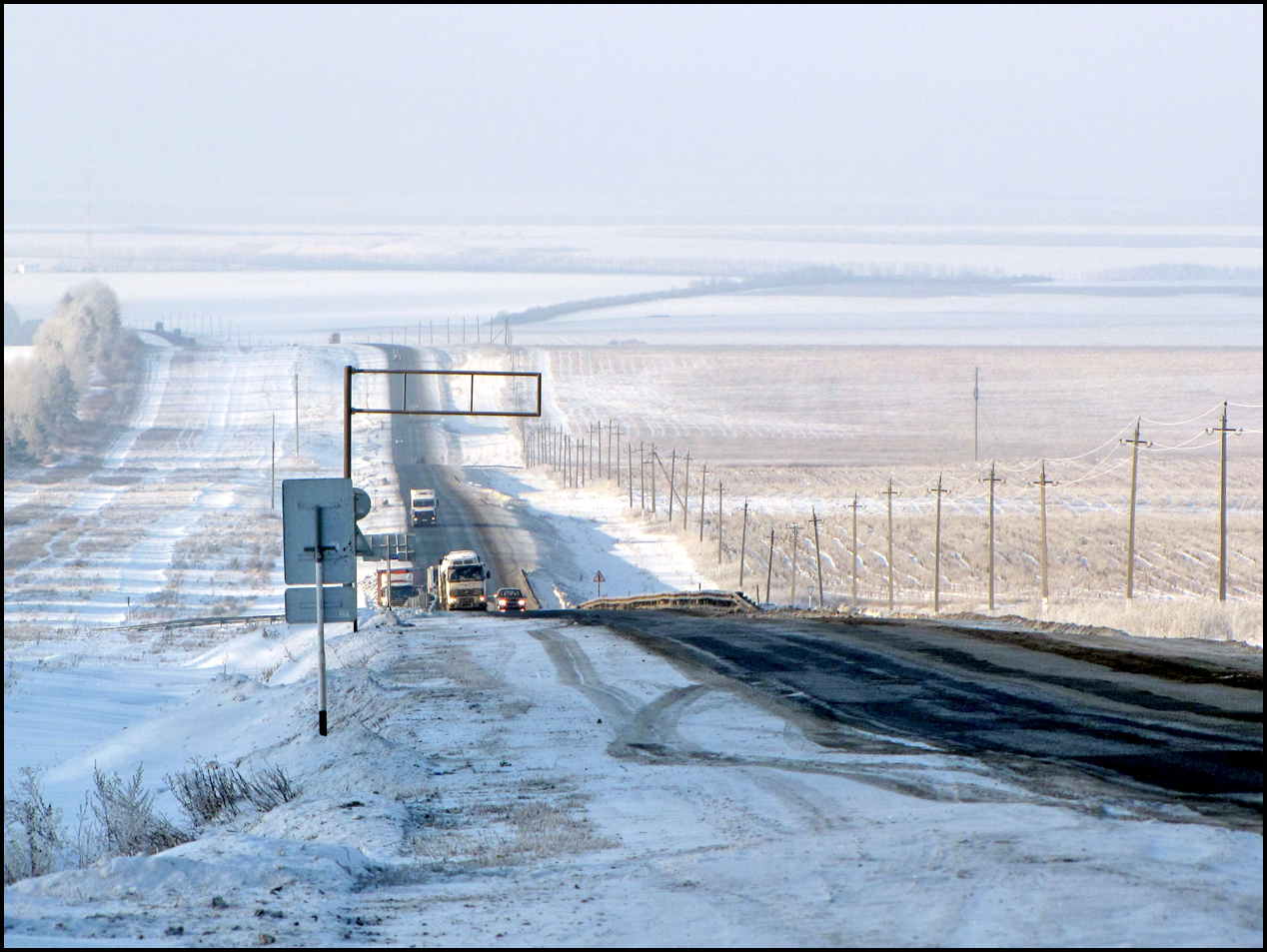
- M5 in Kamyshlinsky District

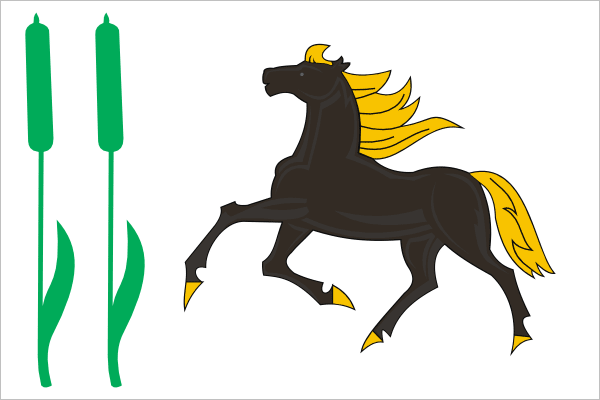
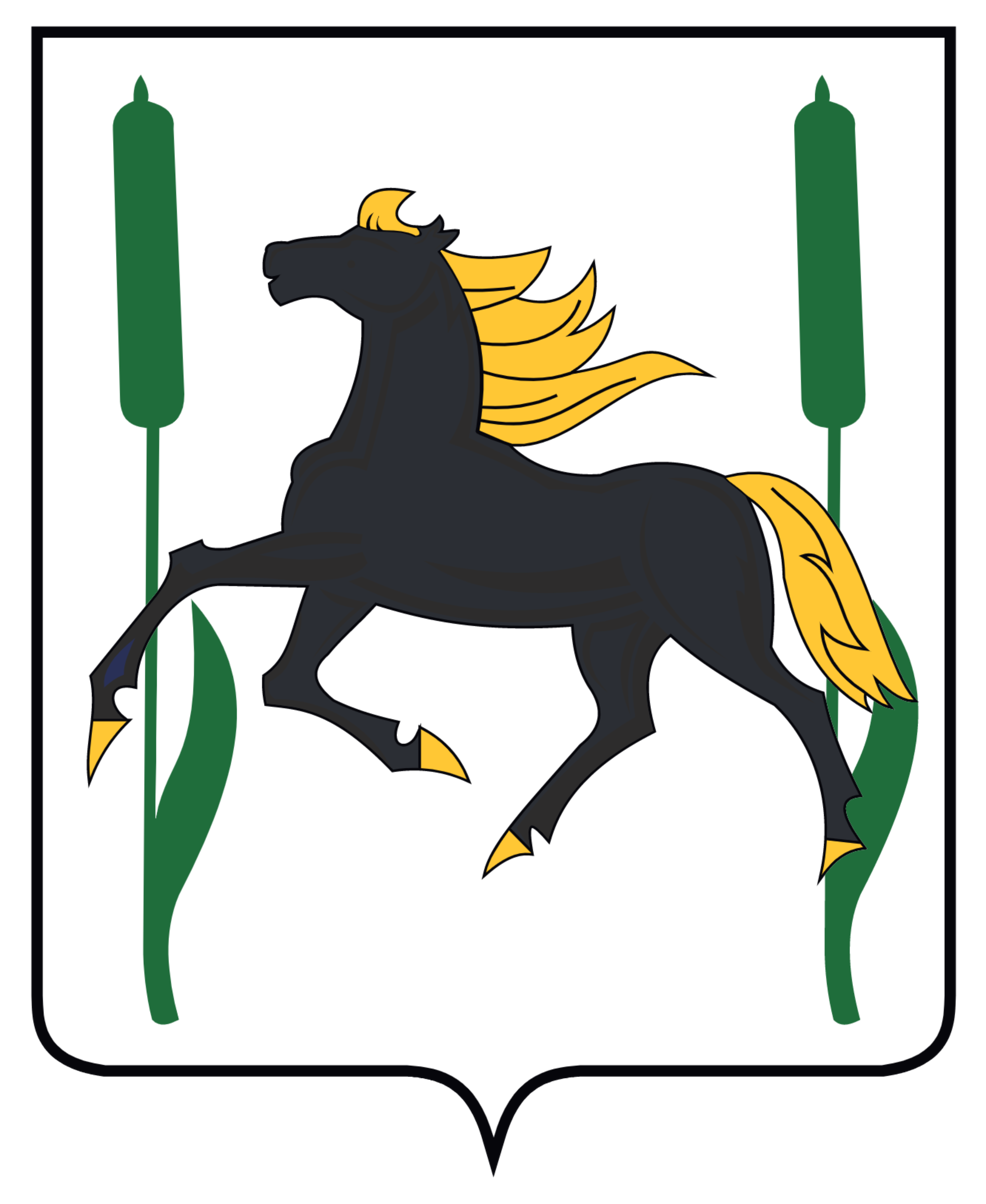
- Flag Coat of arms
- Location of Kamyshlinsky District in Samara Oblast
- Coordinates: 54°06′N 52°08′E
- Country: Russia
- Federal subject: Samara Oblast
- Established: October 9, 1929 (first), 1991 (second)
- Administrative center: Kamyshla

Area
  - Total: 823.5 km^{2} (318.0 sq mi)

Population (2010 Census)
  - Total: 11,420
  - Density: 13.87/km^{2} (35.92/sq mi)
  - Urban: 0%
  - Rural: 100%

Administrative structure
  - Inhabited localities: 22 rural localities

Municipal structure
  - Municipally incorporated as: Kamyshlinsky Municipal District
  - Municipal divisions: 0 urban settlements, 6 rural settlements
- Time zone: UTC+4 (MSK+1)
- OKTMO ID: 36617000
- Website: http://www.kamadm.ru

Kamyshlinsky District (Russian: Камышлинский райо́н; Tatar: Камышлы районы) is an administrative and municipal district (raion), one of the twenty-seven in Samara Oblast, Russia. It is located in the northeast of the oblast. The area of the district is 823.5 square kilometers (318.0 sq mi). Its administrative center is the rural locality (a selo) of Kamyshla. Population: 11,420 (2010 Census); 11,868 (2002 census). The population of Kamyshla accounts for 42.8% of the district's total population.

== History ==
The district was established on October 9, 1929 as Baytugansky Ethnic (Tatar) District (Байтуганский национальный (татарский) район). In 1937, it was renamed Kamyshlinsky. The district was abolished in the 1960s and re-created in its current form in 1991.
