= Yelkhovsky District =

Yelkhovsky District Елховский район (Russian)
- District
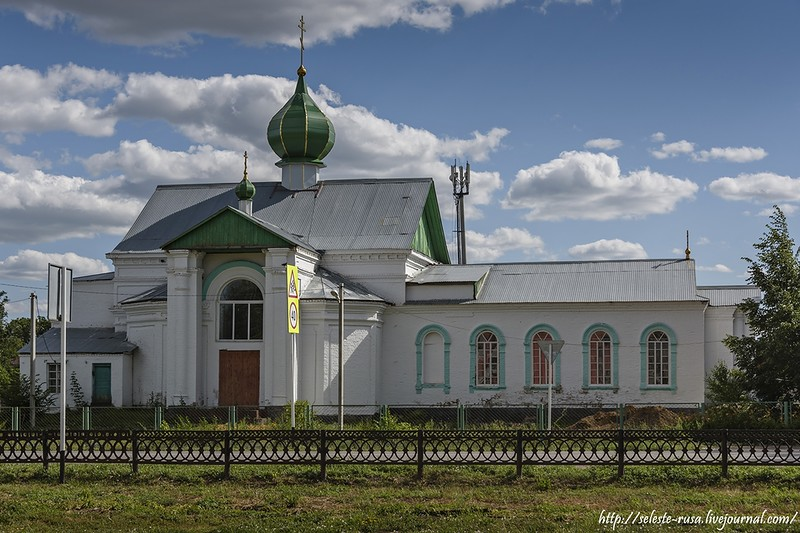
- Church in Elhovka, Yelkhovsky District

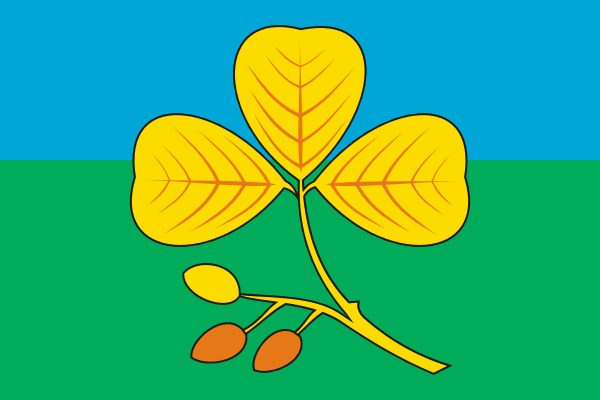
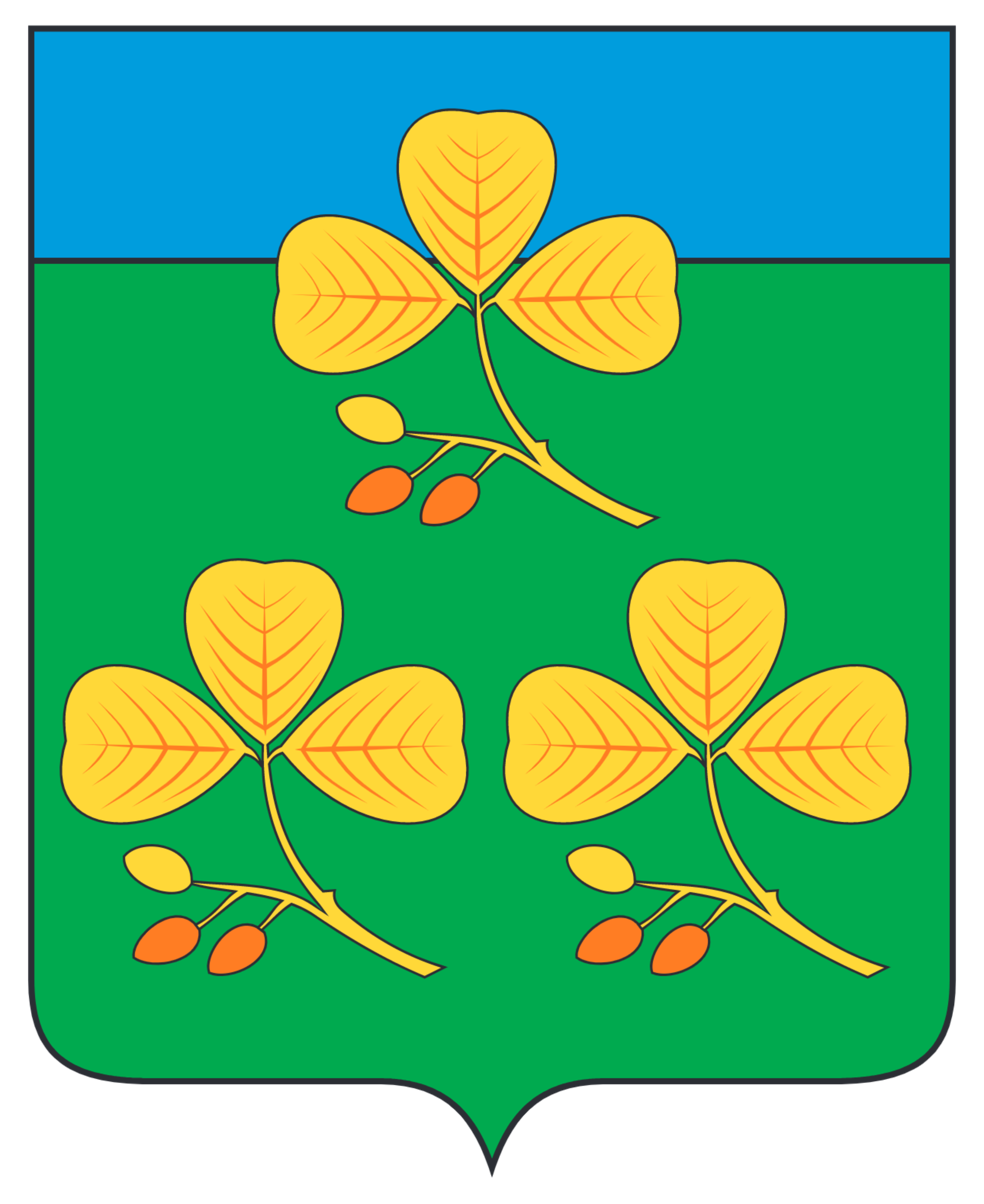
- Flag Coat of arms
- Location of Yelkhovsky District in Samara Oblast
- Coordinates: 53°52′N 50°17′E
- Country: Russia
- Federal subject: Samara Oblast
- Established: May 14, 1928 (first), January 13, 1992 (most recent)
- Administrative center: Yelkhovka

Area
  - Total: 1,201 km^{2} (464 sq mi)

Population (2010 Census)
  - Total: 10,046
  - Density: 8.365/km^{2} (21.66/sq mi)
  - Urban: 0%
  - Rural: 100%

Administrative structure
  - Inhabited localities: 39 rural localities

Municipal structure
  - Municipally incorporated as: Yelkhovsky Municipal District
  - Municipal divisions: 0 urban settlements, 7 rural settlements
- Time zone: UTC+4 (MSK+1)
- OKTMO ID: 36615000
- Website: http://elhovskiy.samregion.ru/

Yelkhovsky District (Russian: Елховский райо́н) is an administrative and municipal district (raion), one of the twenty-seven in Samara Oblast, Russia. It is located in the north of the oblast. The area of the district is 1,201 square kilometers (464 sq mi). Its administrative center is the rural locality (a selo) of Yelkhovka. Population: 10,046 (2010 Census); 10,187 (2002 census). The population of Yelkhovka accounts for 32.5% of the district's total population.

== History ==
The district was first established on May 14, 1928 within Middle Volga Oblast. It went through a number of changes, transformations, and abolitions, and was re-established in its current form on January 13, 1992.
