= Koshkinsky District =

Koshkinsky District Кошкинский район (Russian)
- District
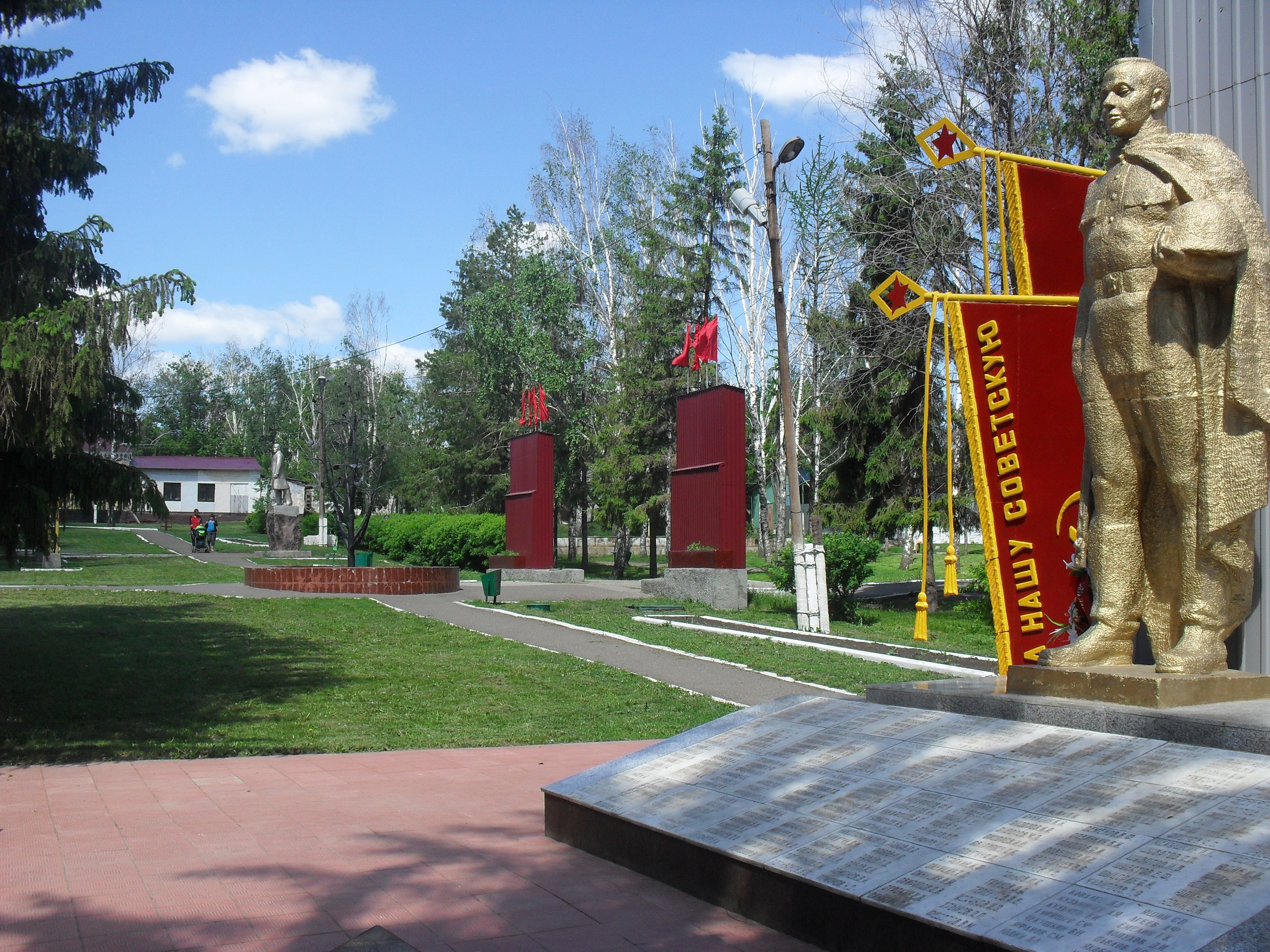
- Park in Koshki, Koshkinsky District

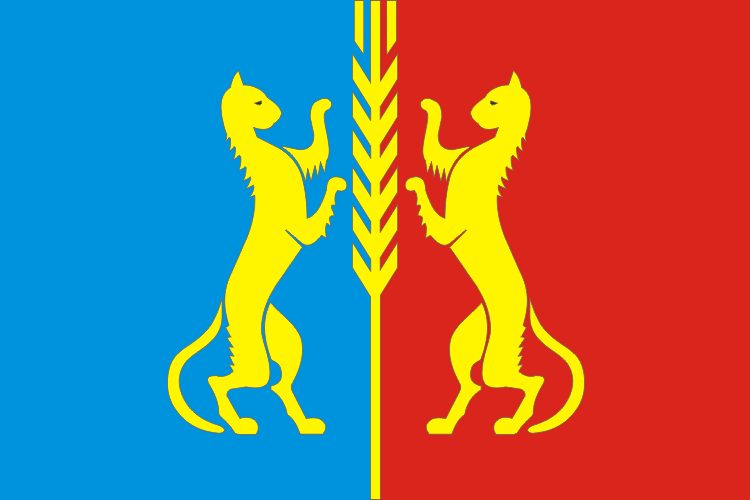
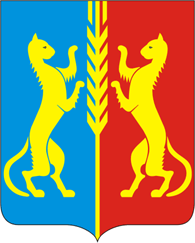
- Flag Coat of arms
- Location of Koshkinsky District in Samara Oblast
- Coordinates: 54°12′N 50°28′E
- Country: Russia
- Federal subject: Samara Oblast
- Established: 16 July 1928
- Administrative center: Koshki

Area
  - Total: 1,750 km^{2} (680 sq mi)

Population (2010 Census)
  - Total: 24,194
  - Density: 13.8/km^{2} (35.8/sq mi)
  - Urban: 0%
  - Rural: 100%

Administrative structure
  - Inhabited localities: 82 rural localities

Municipal structure
  - Municipally incorporated as: Koshkinsky Municipal District
  - Municipal divisions: 0 urban settlements, 13 rural settlements
- Time zone: UTC+4 (MSK+1)
- OKTMO ID: 36624000
- Website: https://kadm63.ru/

Koshkinsky District (Russian: Ко́шкинский райо́н) is an administrative and municipal district (raion), one of the twenty-seven in Samara Oblast, Russia. It is located in the north of the oblast. The area of the district is 1,750 square kilometers (680 sq mi). Its administrative center is the rural locality (a selo) of Koshki. Population: 24,194 (2010 Census); 25,239 (2002 census); 34,766 (1989 Soviet census). The population of Koshki accounts for 32.9% of the district's total population.
