= Pokhvistnevo, Samara Oblast =

Town in Samara Oblast, Russia

Pokhvistnevo Похвистнево
- Town
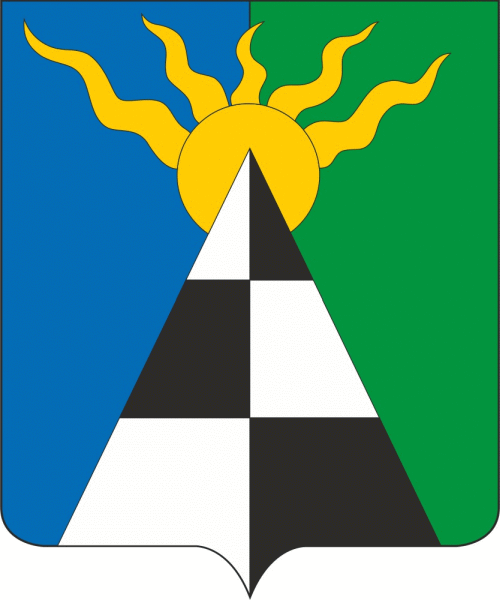
- Flag Coat of arms
- Interactive map of Pokhvistnevo
- Location of Pokhvistnevo Pokhvistnevo (Samara Oblast)
- Coordinates: 53°39′N 52°08′E
- Country: Russia
- Federal subject: Samara Oblast
- Founded: 1888
- Town status since: 1947
- Elevation: 80 m (260 ft)

Population (2010 Census)
  - Total: 28,169
  - Estimate (2021): 27,333 (−3%)

Administrative status
  - Subordinated to: town of oblast significance of Pokhvistnevo
  - Capital of: Pokhvistnevsky District, town of oblast significance of Pokhvistnevo

Municipal status
  - Urban okrug: Pokhvistnevo Urban Okrug
  - Capital of: Pokhvistnevo Urban Okrug, Pokhvistnevsky Municipal District
- Time zone: UTC+4 (MSK+1)
- Postal code: 446450
- OKTMO ID: 36727000001

Pokhvistnevo (Russian: Похвистнево) is a town in Samara Oblast, Russia, located on the left bank of the Bolshoy Kinel River (Samara's tributary), 159 kilometers (99 mi) northeast of Samara, Russia and only 5 kilometers (3.1 mi) from the border with Orenburg Oblast. Population: 28,169 (2010 census); 27,973 (2002 census); 27,843 (1989 Soviet census).

== History ==
It was founded in 1888 as a settlement serving the construction of the Samara–Ufa railroad. The present Pokhvistnevo railway station was built here in 1902–1904. Town status was granted to it in 1947.

== Administrative and municipal status ==
Within the framework of administrative divisions, Pokhvistnevo serves as the administrative center of Pokhvistnevsky District, even though it is not a part of it. As an administrative division, it is, together with one rural locality, incorporated separately as the town of oblast significance of Pokhvistnevo—an administrative unit with the status equal to that of the districts. As a municipal division, the town of oblast significance of Pokhvistnevo is incorporated as Pokhvistnevo Urban Okrug.
