= Klyavlinsky District =

Klyavlinsky District Клявлинский район (Russian)
- District
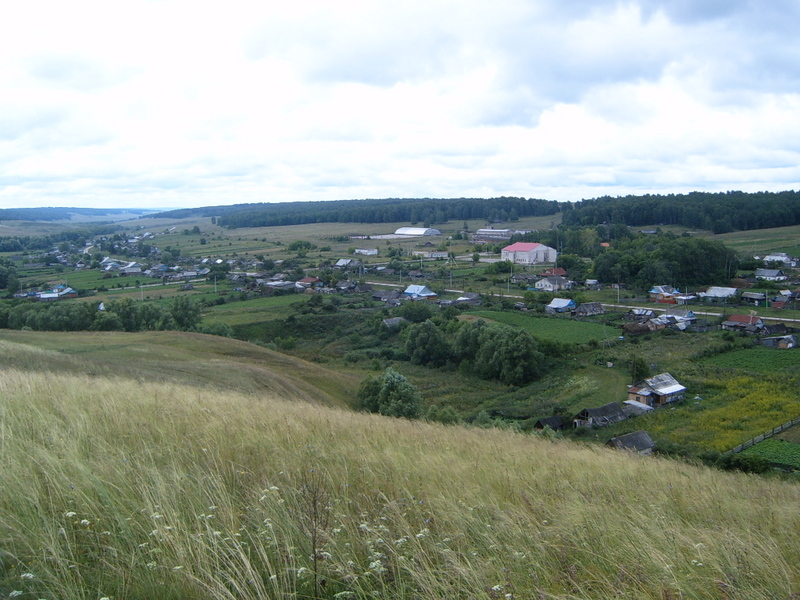
- Village (selo) New Pines, Klyavlinsky District

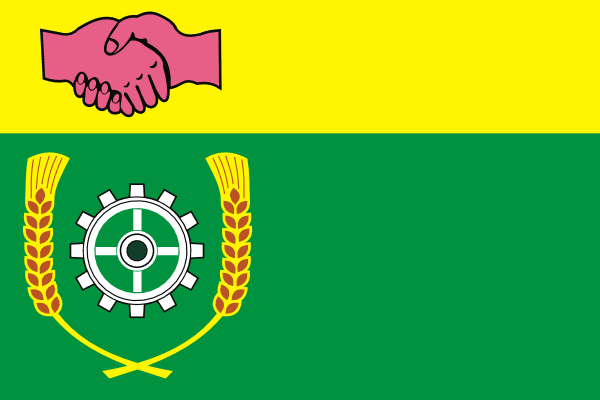
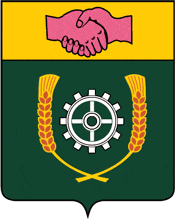
- Flag Coat of arms
- Location of Klyavlinsky District in Samara Oblast
- Coordinates: 54°16′N 52°02′E
- Country: Russia
- Federal subject: Samara Oblast
- Established: 16 July 1928
- Administrative center: Klyavlino

Area
  - Total: 1,160 km^{2} (450 sq mi)

Population (2010 Census)
  - Total: 15,988
  - Density: 13.8/km^{2} (35.7/sq mi)
  - Urban: 0%
  - Rural: 100%

Administrative structure
  - Inhabited localities: 51 rural localities

Municipal structure
  - Municipally incorporated as: Klyavlinsky Municipal District
  - Municipal divisions: 0 urban settlements, 6 rural settlements
- Time zone: UTC+4 (MSK+1)
- OKTMO ID: 36622000
- Website: http://www.klvadm.ru/

Klyavlinsky District (Russian: Кля́влинский райо́н) is an administrative and municipal district (raion), one of the twenty-seven in Samara Oblast, Russia. It is located in the northeast of the oblast. The area of the district is 1,160 square kilometers (450 sq mi). Its administrative center is the rural locality (a railway station) of Klyavlino. Population: 15,988 (2010 Census); 16,437 (2002 census); 30,179 (1989 Soviet census). The population of the administrative center accounts for 43.6% of the district's total population.
