= Volzhsky District, Samara Oblast =

Volzhsky District Волжский район (Russian)
- District
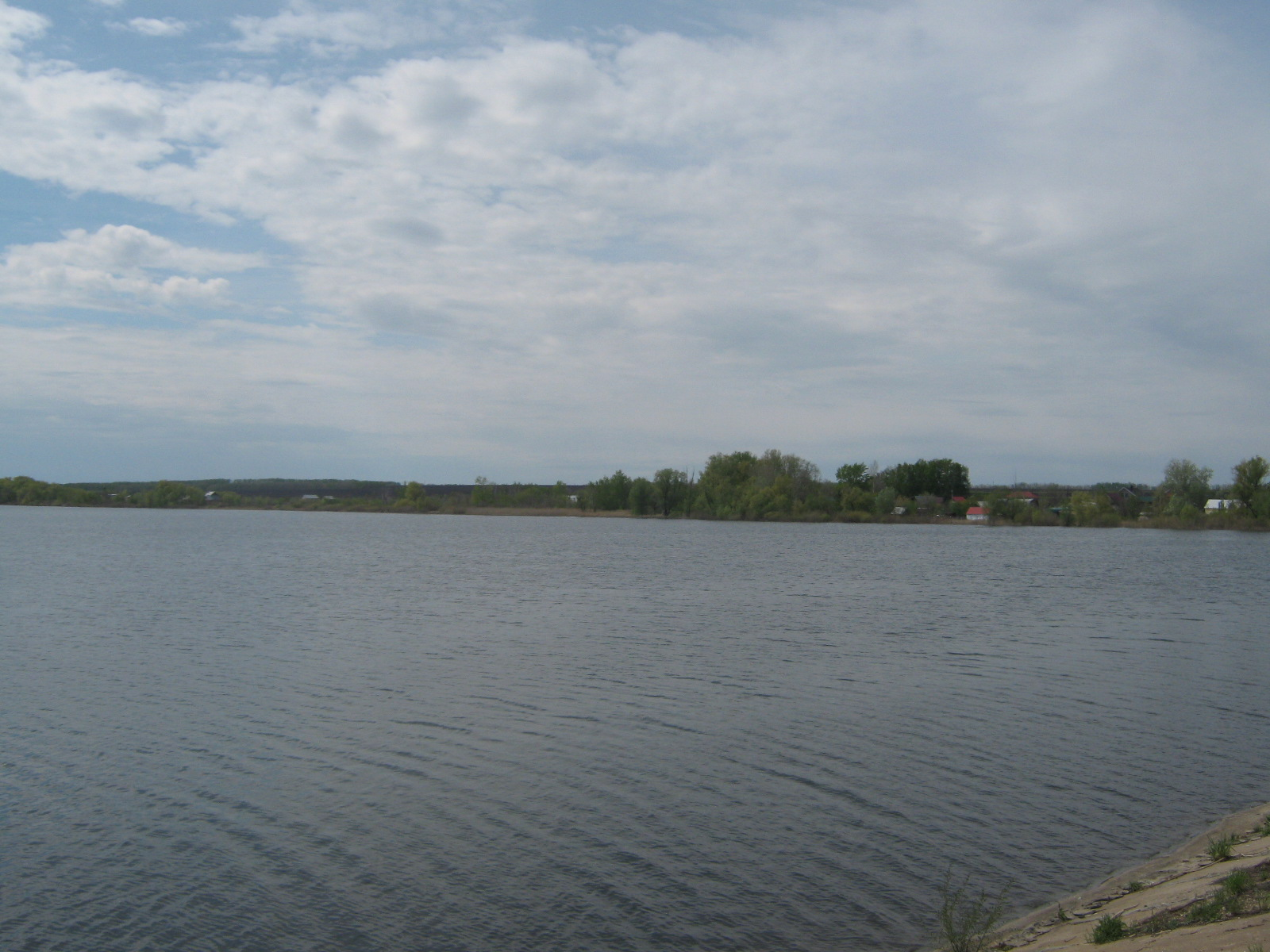
- Chyornovskoye Reservoir in Volzhsky District

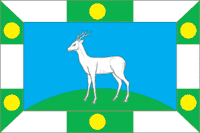
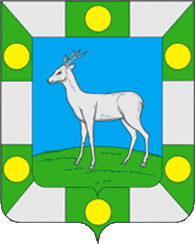
- Flag Coat of arms
- Location of Volzhsky District in Samara Oblast
- Coordinates: 53°14′N 50°10′E
- Country: Russia
- Federal subject: Samara Oblast
- Established: 1937
- Administrative center: Samara

Area
  - Total: 2,481 km^{2} (958 sq mi)

Population (2010 Census)
  - Total: 83,377
  - Density: 33.61/km^{2} (87.04/sq mi)
  - Urban: 38.9%
  - Rural: 61.1%

Administrative structure
  - Inhabited localities: 4 urban-type settlements, 57 rural localities

Municipal structure
  - Municipally incorporated as: Volzhsky Municipal District
  - Municipal divisions: 3 urban settlements, 12 rural settlements
- Time zone: UTC+4 (MSK+1)
- OKTMO ID: 36614000
- Website: http://v-adm63.ru/

Volzhsky District (Russian: Во́лжский райо́н) is an administrative and municipal district (raion), one of the twenty-seven in Samara Oblast, Russia. It is located in the center of the oblast. The area of the district is 2,481 square kilometers (958 sq mi). Its administrative center is the city of Samara (which is not administratively a part of the district). Population: 83,377 (2010 Census); 77,621 (2002 census); 64,974 (1989 Soviet census).

== Administrative and municipal status ==
Within the framework of administrative divisions, Volzhsky District is one of the twenty-seven in the oblast. The city of Samara serves as its administrative center, despite being incorporated separately as a city of oblast significance—an administrative unit with the status equal to that of the districts.

As a municipal division, the district is incorporated as Volzhsky Municipal District. The city of oblast significance of Samara is incorporated separately from the district as Samara Urban Okrug.
