= 2026 Dobropillia offensive =

2026 offensive in the Russo-Ukrainian war

- Part of the eastern front of the Russo-Ukrainian war (2022–present)
Date	22 July 2026 – present (4 months)
Location	Dobropillia, Donetsk Oblast, Ukraine
Status	Ongoing

Belligerents
Russia	Ukraine

Units involved
Russian Armed Forces; 8th Combined Arms Army; 41st Combined Arms Army; 90th Tank Division; 9th Motorized Rifle Brigade; 61st Naval Infantry Brigade	Armed Forces of Ukraine; 1st Azov Corps; 15th Operational Brigade; 93rd Mechanized Brigade; Rubizh Brigade; ”Phoenix” Regiment

The 2026 Dobropillia offensive is a military operation in the Russo-Ukrainian war by the Russian Armed Forces with the primary goal of capturing the city of Dobropillia in the western Donetsk Oblast.

== Background ==
The Russian army conducted a protracted military operation since mid-2024 to seize the strategic Ukrainian city of Pokrovsk. Following a 18-month battle, the campaign concluded with the Russian capture of the city in early 2026. Even though the frontline remained stable for several months thereafter, the city of Dobropillia was seen as Russia's next target. Russian forces approached the city by summer 2026.

In August 2025, Russian forces breached Ukrainian defenses east of Dobropillia as a result of a surprise offensive. The Ukrainian army had reversed all the Russian advances by fall 2025 after a counteroffensive.

== Offensive ==
Russian troops launched their renewed offensive toward Dobropillia by conducting a mechanized assault southeast of the city on 22 July. This type of attack was rare as it was the first large-scale Russian mechanized assault in over a year. Ukrainian forces managed to repel this attack by destroying nine Russian tanks, two armored vehicles and three Grad rocket systems. At the same time, Russian forces advanced up to the Rodynske – Novooleksandrivka line to the south of Dobropillia. The Ukrainian Rubizh Brigade stated that Russia is intensifying its offensive operations north of Pokrovsk in preparation of an offensive toward Dobropillia. According to the brigade, Russian troops are actively conducting aerial reconnaissance and demining operations to allow assault groups on quad bikes and motorcycles to advance. Meanwhile, Russian units were spotted operating in the city of Bilytske located north of Rodynske by 26 July. It became increasingly difficult to get supplies into the city. With all the roads being under constant drone control, the only way of transportation to reach Dobropillia is on foot. Another threat for the Ukrainian forces defending Dobropillia is the intensive usage of Russian glide bombs causing massive destruction to the city.

By the end of July, Russian forces took control of Bilytske. Simultaneously, the Russian army pushed into Shevchenko south of Dobropillia and toward the settlements of Svitle and Vodianske. The next week, Russian soldiers infiltrated the villages of Krasnoyarske and Matyasheve. Russian forces cleared the last Ukrainian positions in the city of Rodynske by 8 August. Military analyst Rob Lee noted on 10 August that the Russian rate of advance towards Dobropillia increased. He added that the first Russian infiltration groups reached the southeastern outskirts of the city, attempting to encircle Dobropillia from the east. Frontline journalist Diana Bucko also reported that Russian forces were gradually advancing closer to Dobropillia, with the first Russians having been spotted within the city limits. South of Dobropillia, Russian soldiers infiltrated into the settlement of Krasnopodillia. The Russian army reportedly began concentrating forces to the southeast of the city in preparation for a further assault on Dobropillia. By 22 August, DeepStateMap confirmed that Russian forces took control of Rodynske. On the other hand, Ukrainian forces pushed back Russian troops near Vodianske.

Ukraine started sending reinforcements to Donetsk Oblast on 26 August to strengthen their positions in the east, including near Dobropillia. Ukrainian commander-in-chief, Mykhailo Drapatyi, additionally appointed Denys Prokopenko, commander of the 1st Azov Corps, to be responsible for the Ukrainian positions in the Dobropillia sector. In the meantime, Ukrainian forces targeted a Russian infiltration group in Hannivka, located to the northeast of the city. The Ukrainian military observed that Russian assault groups increased their attempts to break through toward Dobropillia during the month of September. Ukrainian commander Prokopenko stated that Russian forces were transferring armored vehicles to the Dobropillia direction in preparation for future mechanized assaults on the city.

The Russian Defence Ministry reported on 22 September that its troops had surrounded Ukrainian forces inside Dobropillia. Two days later, they published a map from Dobropillia to support their claim. However, the alleged encirclement of the city was not backed by any geolocated evidence. According to the Institute for the Study of War the Russian claim is false, assessing that the closest Russian positions are about 10 kilometers away from Dobropillia. The Ukrainian 1st Azov Corps responded that their forces remain in control of the city. Russian forces began infiltrating the southern parts of the city of Dobropillia by early October. Further to the northeast, Ukrainian units pushed back Russian troops near the Dobropillia – Kramatorsk highway.

On 16 October, Russian Chief of the General Staff, Valery Gerasimov, reported that the Russian army seized the city of Dobropillia. The following day, Ukraine’s General Staff dismissed the Russian announcement, stating that the claimed advances are ‘an illusion’. Ukrainian president Volodymyr Zelenskyy added that Dobropillia remained under Ukrainian control. He also stressed that Ukraine recaptured more territory than Russia since the start of autumn. Meanwhile, a Ukrainian military observer reported that Russian forces took control of Matyasheve to the south of Dobropillia. A Russian supporting effort was launched along the M30 Pokrovsk – Pavlohrad highway towards the village of Serhiivka. Russian units expanded their infiltration zone into central Dobropillia by 25 October. Troops from the south reached the city center, while a second group advanced from the eastern flank advanced to the northern outskirts of the city through the village of Hannivka.

At the end of October, Russian forces captured Svitle and Vodianske south of Dobropillia. One week later, the Russian army advanced in the southern parts of the city. Reports from the frontline began to indicate that Russian forces deployed additional heavy equipment to the Dobropillia direction.

== See also ==
- 2026 Ukrainian counteroffensive
- Huliaipole offensive
- Velyka Novosilka offensive
