= Rodynske =

City in Donetsk Oblast, Ukraine

Rodynske Родинське
- City
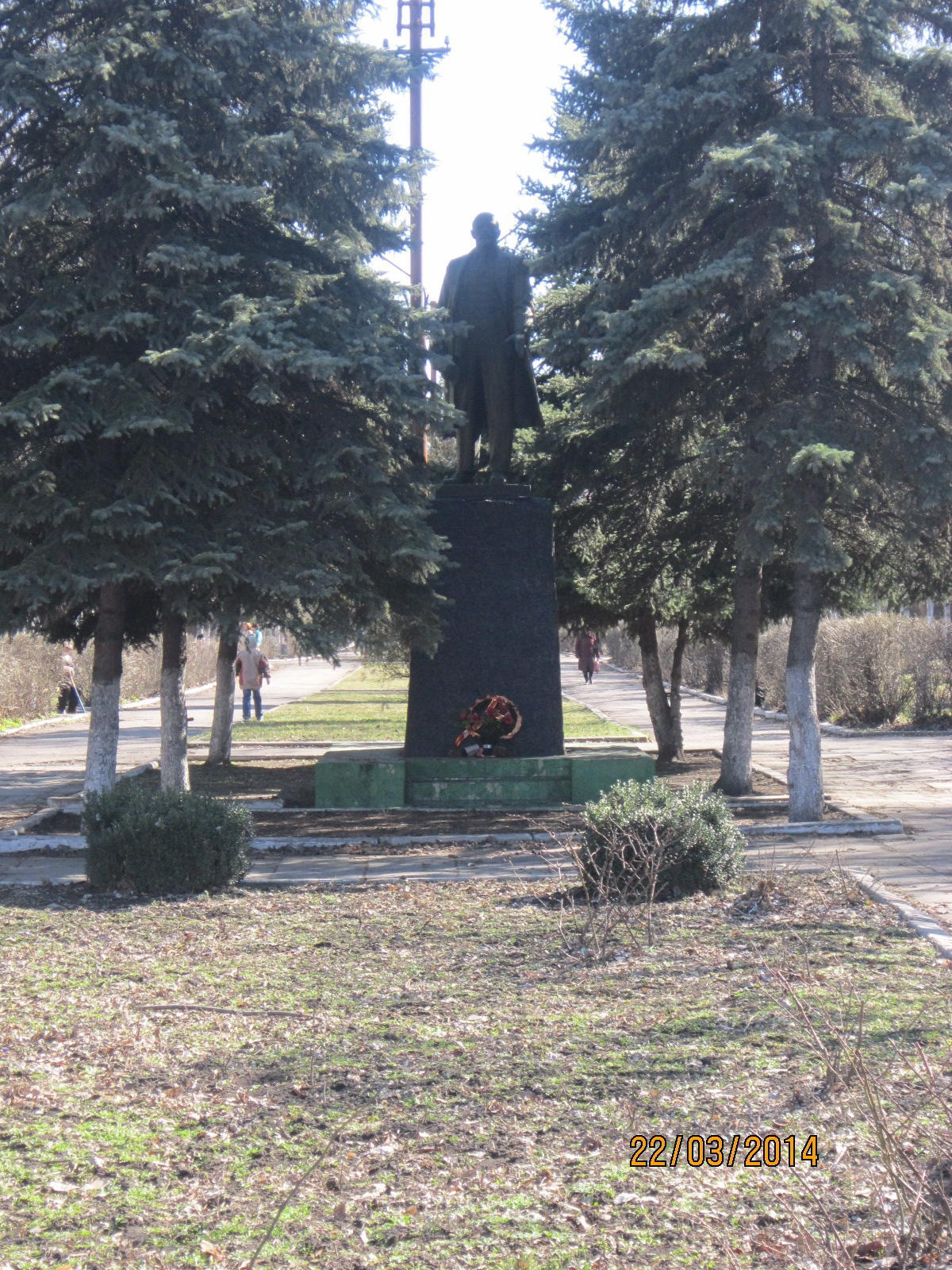
- Vladimir Lenin statue in 2014.

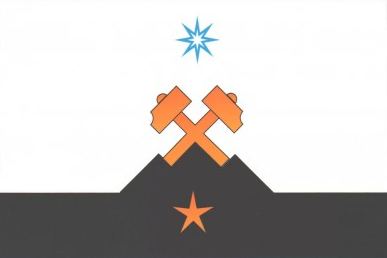
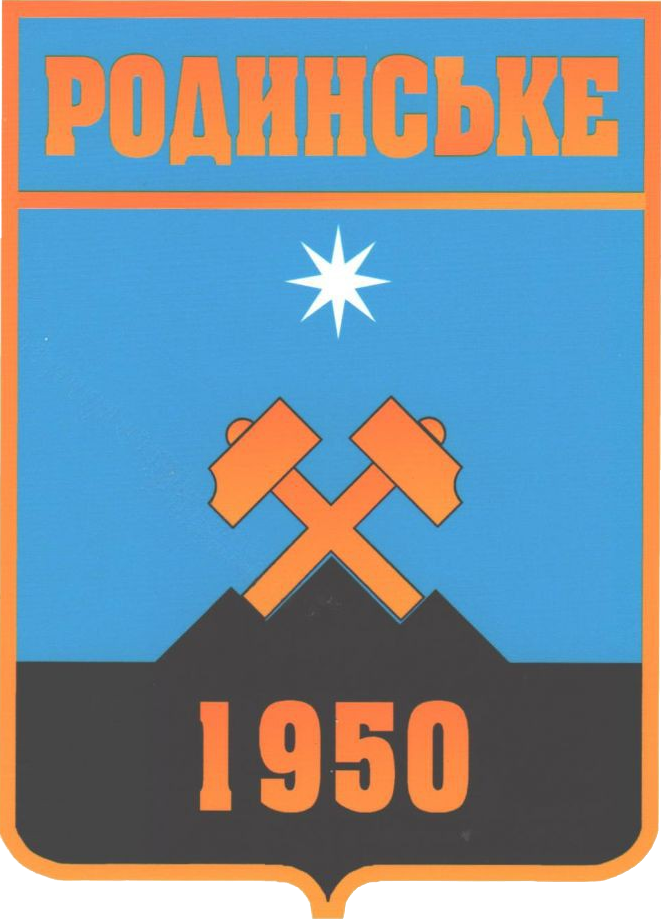
- Flag Seal
- Interactive map of Rodynske
- Location within Donetsk Oblast Location within Ukraine
- Coordinates: 48°21′11″N 37°12′36″E
- Country: Ukraine
- Oblast: Donetsk Oblast
- Raion: Pokrovsk Raion
- Hromada: Pokrovsk urban hromada
- Established: 1950

Government
  - Mayor: Kateryna Andriychenko

Area
  - Total: 6.7 km^{2} (2.6 sq mi)
- Elevation: 190 m (620 ft)

Population (2022)
  - Total: 9,850
  - Density: 1,500/km^{2} (3,800/sq mi)
- Postal code: 85310—87315
- Area code: +380-6239

Rodynske (Ukrainian: Родинське, pronounced [ˈrɔdɪnʲsʲke]; Russian: Родинское) is a city in Pokrovsk urban hromada, Donetsk Oblast (province) of Ukraine. Population: 9,850 (2022 estimate); 1,500 (2025).

== Geography ==
From the north and west sides, the territory of the city is bordered by the lands of the Dobropillia hromada, from the east — the lands of the Novoekonomichne and Krasnyi Lyman, from the south — the Rivne, Pokrovsk Raion. The T0515 highway and the railway, the Rodynska station, pass near the city.

== History ==
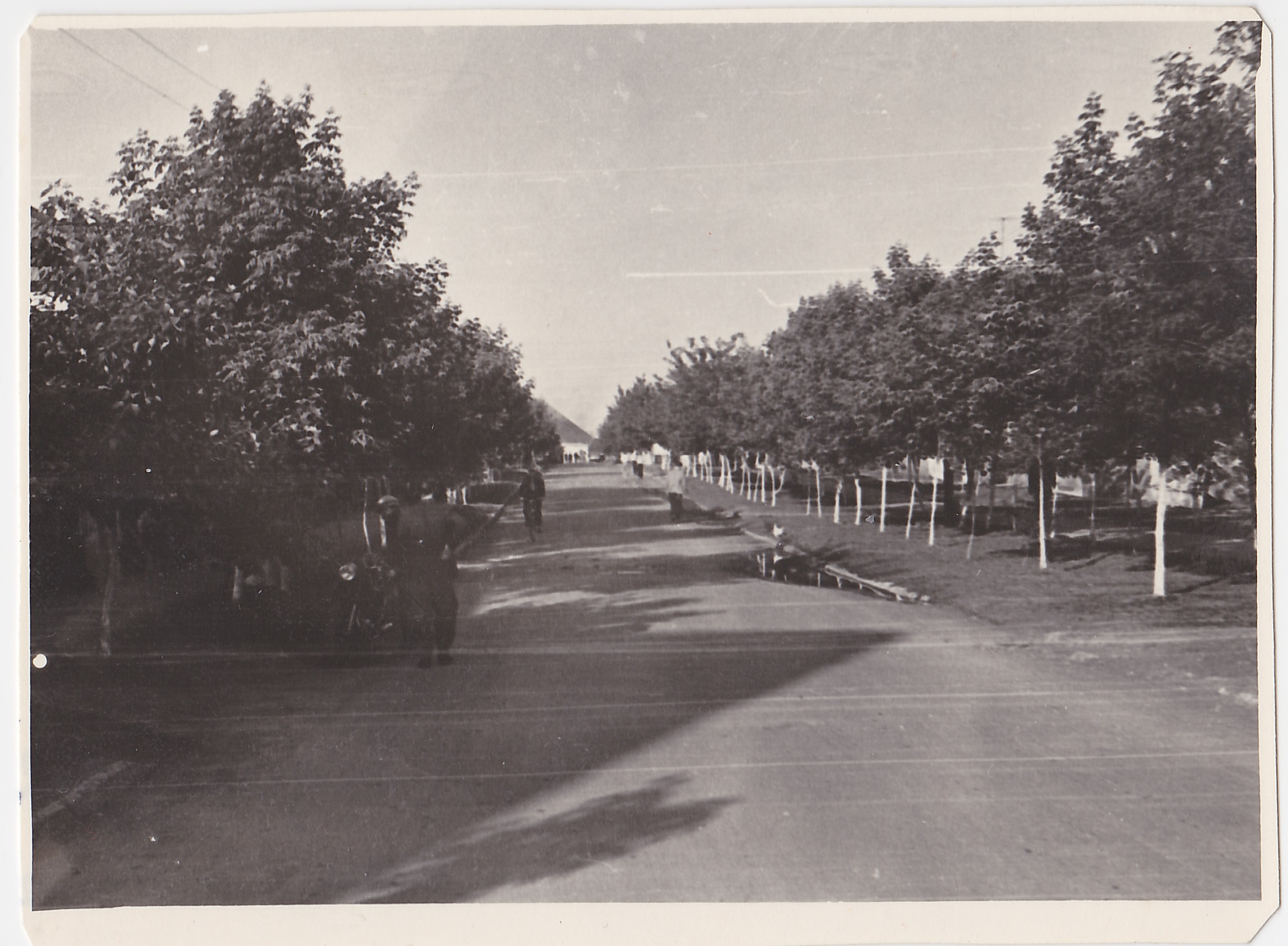
Rodynske city park in 1960s.

=== Cold War Era ===
Founded in 1950 in connection with the construction of coal mines. The city was also built by mine workers, — they also set up their tents on the territory of the modern city. This was the first housing in the future city. The old names of the modern city of Rodynske - the village of Rodynska Mine No. 2, and even earlier - the combined village of the mines "Rodynska" No. 2, "Krasnolymanska" and "Zaporiz'ka". The area of the combined mining village, according to the economic and territorial certificate for 1951, was 260 hectares, the population - 2025 people. The total housing stock of the village then amounted to 6298 sq. m. The construction of 30 individual houses was started with the completion date in 1954.

In 1962, it received the status of a city with district subordination. Since then, there were bult 11 libraries, 2 of which — technical. The following were opened: House of Culture, Palace of Pioneers and Schoolchildren, 3 schools, 7 kindergartens (now 4 are operating), a music school, a hospital town, later — a House of Life and a restaurant (burned down in the mid-70s and was not restored) In 2000, residents celebrated the 50th anniversary of their native city. In Rodynske there is the Church of the Pochayiv Icon of the Mother of God Pokrovskoe Deanery Donetsk Diocese Ukrainian Orthodox Church of the Moscow Patriarchate.

=== Russo-Ukrainian war ===
With the approach of the front and attacks by Russian troops, there has been no water supply and electricity since September 2024, and no gas supply since January 2025. As of February 2025, 1,600 residents remained in the city. In May, there were 850 residents. On 2 August 2025, the Russian forces entered the city from the east in a flanking maneuver as part of an encirclement effort for the city of Pokrovsk. By around 25 October 2025, the city was fully captured by the Russian forces for the first time.

On 1 November 2025, Ukrainian Armed Forces started launching counterattacks directed at liberating the city. By 7 November 2025, the Ukrainian forces infiltrated the city and entrenched themselves, consolidating in a number of houses and high-rise buildings. By 10 November 2025, Ukrainian Armed Forces partially liberated Rodynske.

However, on 28 December 2025, the Russian ‍defense ministry said that the Russian troops have fully captured Rodynske for the second time. As of 11 January 2026, according to various Ukrainian sources, such as Free Radio Ukraine, the city is fully controlled or contested by the Ukrainian Army. As of late April 2026, the Institute for the Study of War's map showed likely Ukrainian presence only in a small part of the town's western outskirts. On 22 August 2026, Russian forces seized the town for the third time.

== Economy ==
The economic profile of the city is determined by the coal mining industry, which is represented by the mines:

- State Enterprise "Krasnolymanskaya Coal Company". The industrial reserve of the enterprise is 234 million 583 thousand tons of coal of the "Zh" brand.
- The "Krasnolymanskaya" mine began its work in 1958. Already in 1959, unprecedented rates of penetration for the Donetsk region were achieved. In 1967, the enterprise achieved a world record - 110 thousand tons of coal were released into the mountain in 31 working days.
- Coal Enterprise "Rodynske" of the "Pokrovskvugillya" enterprise.
- The "Rodynska" mine is an enterprise of high culture and organization. It was put into operation on December 25, 1954.

== Demographics ==
In 1992, the population of Rodynske was 15,300 inhabitants. As of the Ukrainian national census in 2001, Rodynske counted 11,988 inhabitants. Like in most urban areas of Donbas, a solid majority of the people living in the town are ethnic Ukrainians, yet Russian is more commonly spoken than Ukrainian. The exact ethnic and linguistic composition was as follows:

Ethnic groups in Rodynske
	percent
Ukrainians	69.34%
Russians	26.62%
Belarusians	1.40%
Armenians	0.62%
Moldovans	0.38%
Tatars	0.28%
Greeks	0.20%
Azerbaijanis	0.19%
others	0.97%

Native languages in Rodynske
	percent
Russian	75.9%
Ukrainian	23.2%
Armenian	0.3%
Belarusian	0.1%
others	0.3%

== Housing ==
According to data from the city's statistical department, the housing stock is 250.0 thousand square meters of the total area. The large and small housing stock is located in the southern part of the city, which is served by the Municipal enterprise "Rodin Center of the single customer" established in 2007. 80% of the housing stock is in an emergency situation, the main problem is the repair of the roof. In the northern part of the city are built farms.
