= Bilytske =

City in Donetsk Oblast, Ukraine

Bilytske Білицьке
- City
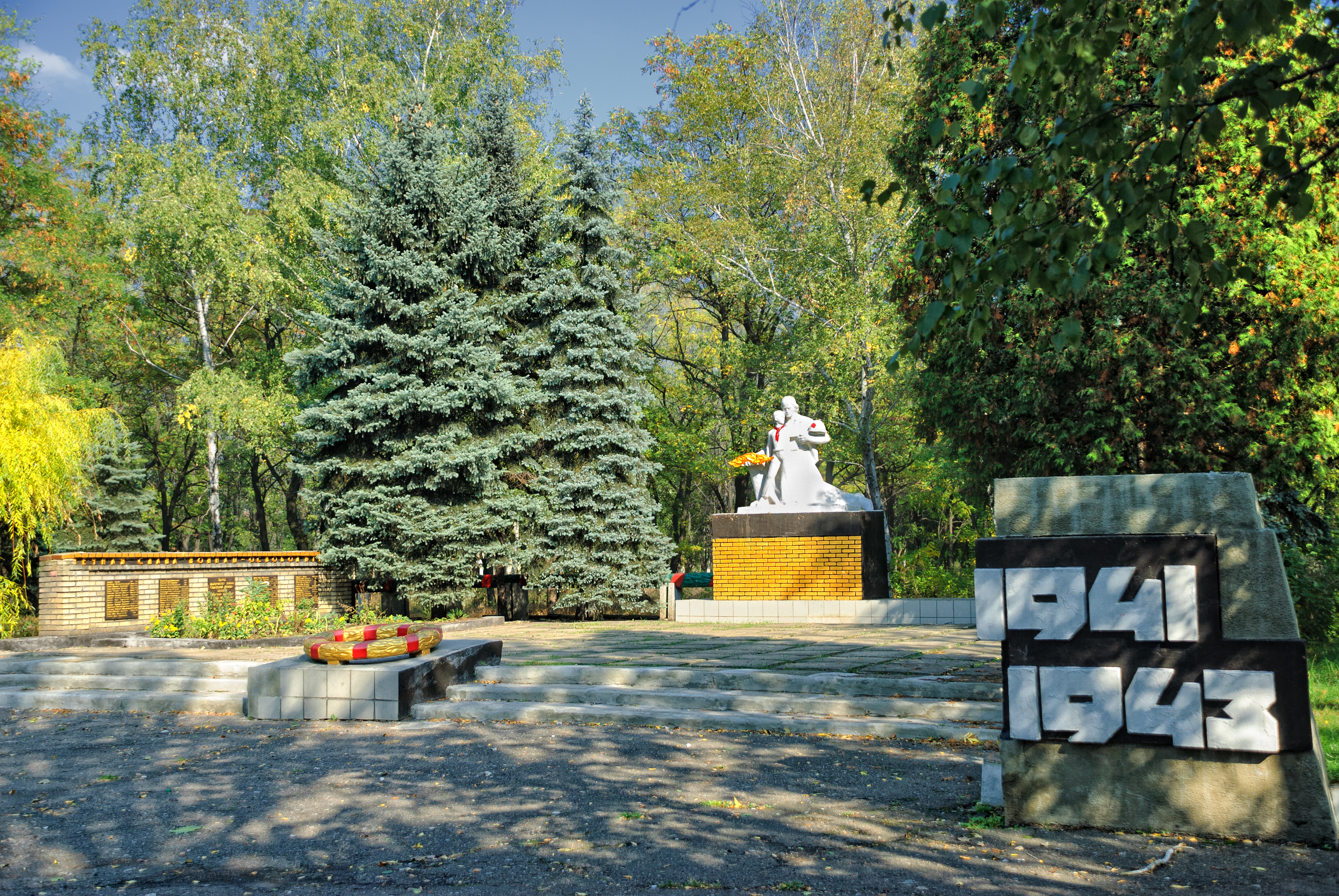
- WW2 memorial in Bilytske

- Flag Seal
- Interactive map of Bilytske
- Location within Donetsk Oblast Location within Ukraine
- Coordinates: 48°24′N 37°11′E
- Country: Ukraine
- Oblast: Donetsk Oblast
- Raion: Pokrovsk Raion
- Hromada: Dobropillia urban hromada
- Foundation: 1909
- City rights: 1966

Government
  - Mayor: Zavarzin Oleksandr Tikhonovych

Area
  - Total: 2.05 km^{2} (0.79 sq mi)
- Elevation: 188 m (617 ft)

Population (2024)
  - Total: ~9,000
  - Estimate (22 August 2025): ▼480
  - Density: 3,787/km^{2} (9,810/sq mi)
- Postal code: 85043—85047
- Area code: +380-6277

Bilytske (Ukrainian: Білицьке, pronounced [ˈbilɪtsʲke]; Russian: Белицкое, romanized: Belitskoye) is a city in Dobropillia urban hromada, Pokrovsk Raion in Donetsk Oblast (province) of Ukraine. The distance to the center of the region (Pokrovsk) is approximately 12 km and can be reached via the T 0515 highway. The town has 7,764 (2022 estimate) inhabitants.

== History ==
The land where Bilytske is located belonged to the landowner Krasin. After he became impoverished, the land was purchased by wealthy peasants Degtyarev, Leshchina, Zavarza, Rubel, and Butenko, who founded a farmstead in 1909. New families from Russia, originally from the village of Belchany, then arrived, and they began calling themselves by their previous place of residence.

In 1909, the farmstead of Belitskoye was first mentioned. It consisted of only 15 adobe houses. After the establishment of Soviet power in the village of Nikanorovka (Dobropillia Raion), a village council was formed, which included the Belitskoye farmstead. In 1932–1933, the first geologists from Yuzovka arrived on the farm, discovering large coal deposits. The construction of a mine and a town was planned, but the Great Patriotic War put an end to all of this.

During the Second World War, from November 1941 to 1943, the settlement was occupied by Axis troops. In the fall of 1941, the Nazis captured the farmstead. The Germans first arrived in mid-November. Only 8-9 houses stood on the site of today's town (now located on Shevchenko Street). Having captured the farmstead, the Germans began forcing the population to work on the farm (the site of today's Gornyak state farm). The Nazis brought their own equipment: tractors, seeders, and mowers. The people worked under German supervision. Failure to comply was severely punished. In February 1943, during the first attempt to liberate the town of Pokrovsk, Donetsk Oblast) (then called Krasnoarmeysk), tank crews and infantrymen from the remnants of the 10th Tank Corps retreating from Krasnoarmeyskoye were killed near the village, along with civilians who were buried in a mass grave. In 1951, a project to build a mine with a workers' settlement for 15,000 people was approved.

Construction of the settlement began in 1953. Demobilized soldiers and young people from various parts of the USSR arrived here on Komsomol vouchers. Belitskoye received urban settlement status on September 14, 1956. The first chairman of the village council was Taras Makarovich Zavgorodniy, a WWII veteran and communist.

In December 1959, builders commissioned the XXI Congress of the CPSU Mine, a year ahead of schedule. In December 1961, the Oktyabrskaya processing plant was commissioned at the mine. In 1963, the XXI Congress of the CPSU Mine reached its design capacity three years ahead of schedule. In December 1966, the urban-type settlement became a city.

In 1980s, coal mining was the backbone of the city's economy. In January 1989, the population of the city was 11,600 people. In May 1995, the Cabinet of Ministers of Ukraine approved the decision to privatize the ATP-11436 and the Oktyabrskaya enrichment plant, in July 1995 the decision on privatization was approved bakery.

The economic crisis that began in 2008 complicated the situation of the bakery, and on October 13, 2010, it was declared bankrupt, and on January 27, 2011, it was liquidated. In January 2013, Bilytske had a population of 8,691 people.

By the end of November 2025, Russia launched an offensive towards the city of Bilytske and the Dobropillia–Kramatorsk highway as part of the Russian invasion of Ukraine. On 23 July 2026, during the Second Dobropillia offensive, Russian forces captured the city.

== Economy ==
- Belitskaya Mine, Vodyanaya Mine, Dobropolyeugol State Enterprise (the latter closed).
- DTEK Oktyabrskaya Central Processing Plant (PJSC).

More than 40% of those employed in the city economy work in the coal industry.

== Demographics ==
As of the 2001 Ukrainian census, the town had a population of 10,154 people. Over 70% of the population were Ukrainians, while 26% claimed to have an ethnic Russian background. Other sizable minorities are Belarusians and Tatars. The exact ethnic composition was as follows:

Ethnic groups in Bilytske
	percent
Ukrainians	70.60%
Russians	26.19%
Belarusians	1.50%
Tatars	0.39%
Ukrainian Greeks	0.19%
Moldovans	0.17%
others	0.20%

In terms of languages, Bilytske has a slim Russophone majority, while a large minority speaks Ukrainian as their first language. The exact compistion was as follows:

Native languages in Bilytske
	percent
Russian	55.7%
Ukrainian	43.7%
Belarusian	0.3%
others	0.2%

== Social sphere ==
=== Education ===
- 3 comprehensive schools of levels I-III
- 3 kindergartens
- Belitsky Lyceum (BPL No. 83)

=== Culture and sports ===
- T.G. Shevchenko Community Center
- Young Technicians Station
- Museum of Military Glory
- Children's Music School
- 2 libraries
- Sports Palace
- Stadium
- Fortuna Sports Club (formerly the Bread Factory)
- Children's playground

=== Religion ===
- Orthodox Church of the Holy Martyr Alexandra of the Ukrainian Orthodox Church (Moscow Patriarchate)
- Chapel of the Holy Great Martyr Barbara of the Ukrainian Orthodox Church
- Church of Evangelical Christians
- Ukrainian Christian Evangelical Church "Generation of Faith"

=== Healthcare ===
- Belitskaya City Hospital (closed by decision of the Donetsk Regional Council as part of healthcare reform in pilot region) From 01.01.2012, it was reformed into the State Institution "DCPMSP" Outpatient Clinic No. 3
- Children's Polyclinic

== Attractions ==
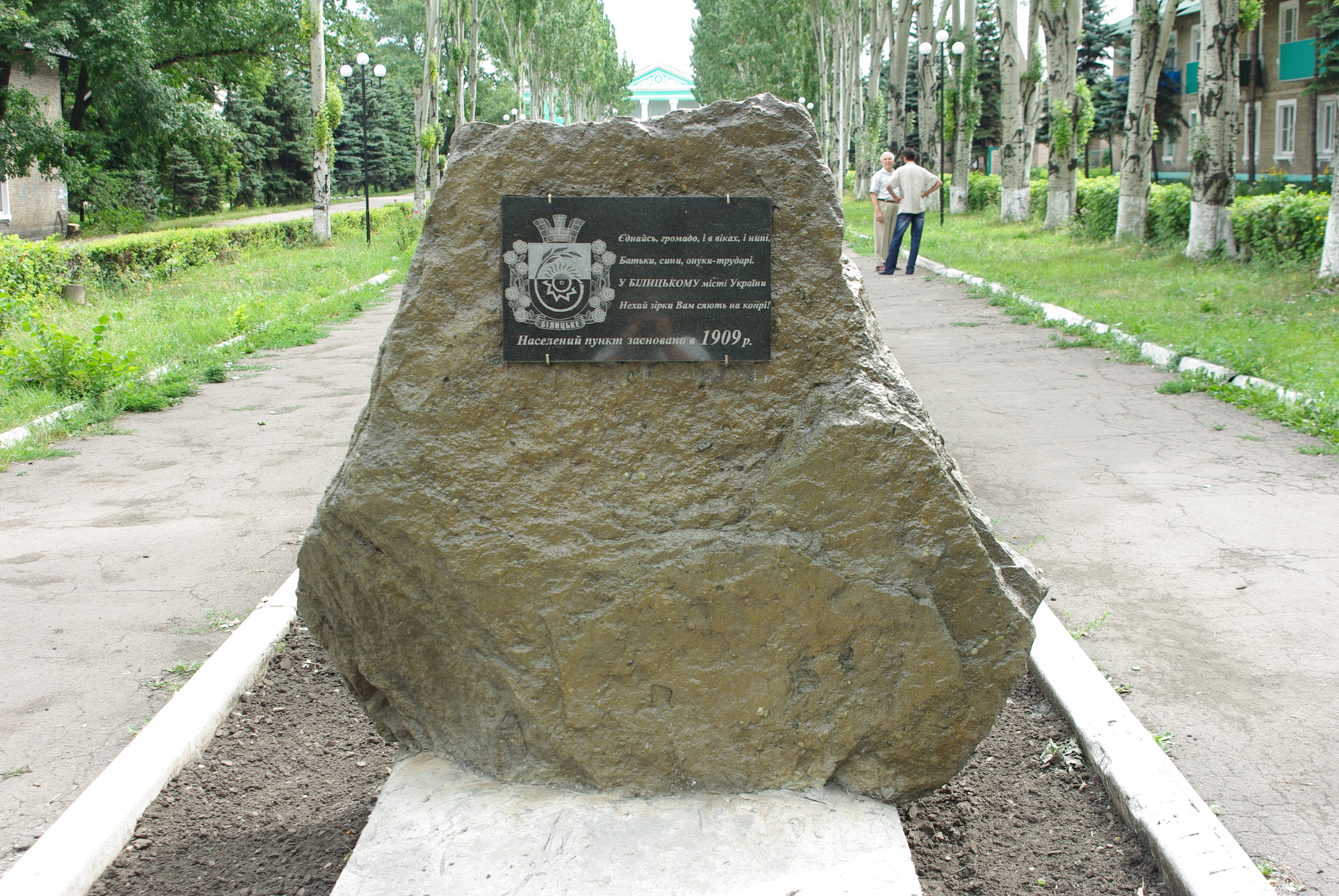
Stone slab commemorating the founding of Belitskoye

- Memorial to the Liberators of the Great Patriotic War of 1941-1945
- Monument to T. G. Shevchenko (located behind the Shevchenko Palace of Culture)
- Monument to V. I. Lenin - Gorky Street (near the Shevchenko Palace of Culture; demolished)
- Monument to Fallen Miners (2006)
- A stone slab commemorating the city's founding was erected for the city's centenary (alley along Mira Street; 2009)
