= Bilozerske =

City in Donetsk Oblast, Ukraine

Bilozerske Білозерське
- City
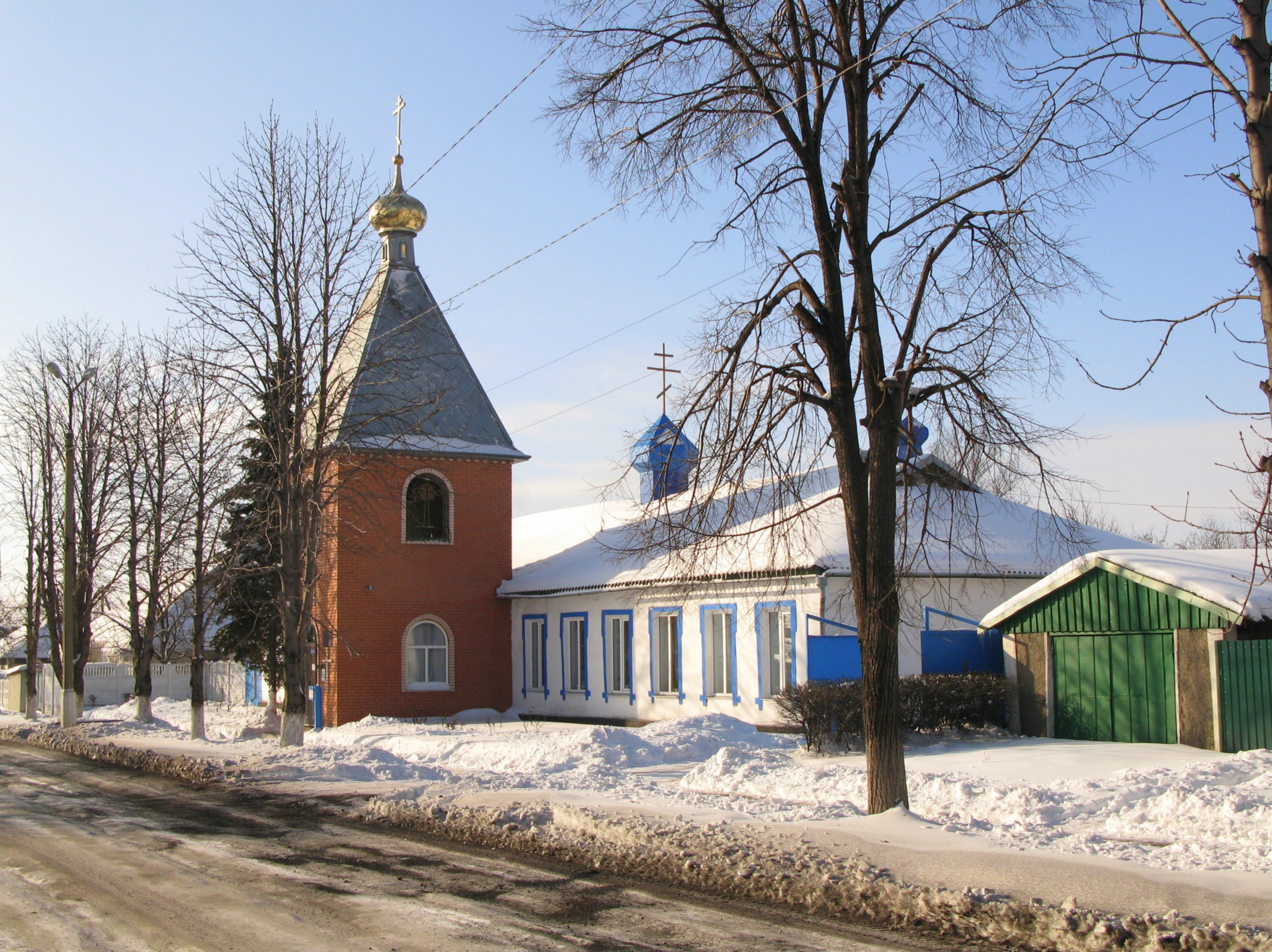
- A church in Bilozerske

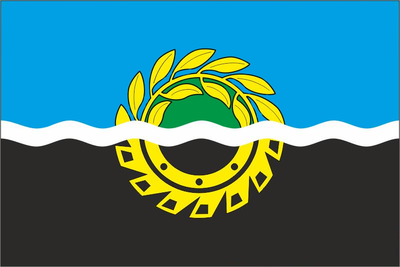
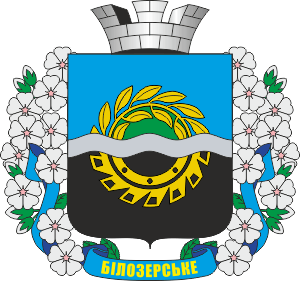
- Flag Seal
- Interactive map of Bilozerske
- Location within Donetsk Oblast Location within Ukraine
- Coordinates: 48°32′12″N 37°03′31″E
- Country: Ukraine
- Oblast: Donetsk Oblast
- Raion: Pokrovsk Raion
- Hromada: Bilozerske urban hromada
- Foundation: 1913
- City rights: 1966

Area
  - Total: 2.48 km^{2} (0.96 sq mi)
- Elevation: 201 m (659 ft)

Population (2022)
  - Total: 14,634
  - Density: 5,900/km^{2} (15,300/sq mi)
- Postal code: 85012—85016
- Area code: +380-6277

Bilozerske (Ukrainian: Білозерське, IPA: [biloˈzɛrsʲke]; Russian: Белозёрское, romanized: Belozyorskoye) is a city in Donetsk Oblast, Ukraine. Population: 14,634 (2022 estimate). As of March 2025, about 11,000 inhabitants remained in the city.

The distance to the city of Dobropillia is approximately 13 km and runs along the T 0515 highway.

== History ==
It was founded in 1913 as a khutir by re-settlers from Melitopol county, Taurida Governorate.

By 1923, in the Belozerskyi farm there were 5 farms, the male and female population with 35 people; 17 men, 18 women. In 1930, the land around khutir was added to the Soviet state farm "Bolshevichok".

On 9 September 1943, Belozerka was liberated from the occupation of Nazi Germany in the Second World War period. In August 1947, near the Belozerka farm on the slope of the Kreidyan ridge, surveyors Deripalko and Chulkov began construction of a new mine No. 3 "Dobropillya". At the same time, construction of a new mining village Belozerske began three kilometers from it and the settlement was transformed.

In 1950, the settlement further developed in connection with the construction of coal mines. In 1956, it received the status of an urban-type settlement. In the same year, a newly built House of Culture was opened here. In 1969, the population of the city was 20.6 thousand people. The basis of the economy was coal mining. In 1979, there were coal mines, the Krasnoarmeyskaya processing plant, an asphalt concrete plant, the Dobropolsky mineral water plant, five comprehensive schools, a music school, a vocational school, eight medical institutions, three libraries, and a club.

In the 1980s, the basis of the economy was coal mining and a mineral water plant. In January 1989, the population of the city was 21.1 thousand people. In May 1995, the Cabinet of Ministers of Ukraine approved a decision to privatize the Krasnoarmeyskaya enrichment plant and the repair and transport enterprise located in the city.

In January 2013 the population was 16,101 people. On 29 May 2015, a monument to Vladimir Lenin was torn down in the city by unknown persons.

== Economy ==
Coal industry (Belozerskaya and Novodonetskaya mines (part of the DTEK Dobropolyeugol LLC) and the Krasnoarmeyskaya-Svyato-Pokrovskaya hydromine (developed by Tekhinnovatsiya LLC), among others.

=== Transport ===
Located 15 km from the nearest railway station, Dobropillia on Donetsk Railway.

== Demographics ==
Ethnic makeup as of the 2001 Ukrainian census:

Ethnic groups in Bilozerske
	percent
Ukrainians	64.91%
Russians	31.63%
Belarusians	1.13%
Tatars	0.63%
Greeks	0.19%
Moldovans	0.16%
Armenians	0.11%
Azerbaijanis	0.11%
Georgians	0.10%

Native language as of the Ukrainian Census of 2001:

- Russian 69.8%
- Ukrainian 29.6%
- Belarusian 0.1%

== Social sphere ==
=== Education ===
- 4 comprehensive schools of grades I-III
- 3 kindergartens (the fourth kindergarten, "Alyonushka," was closed in May 2021)
- Belozerske Professional Mining Lyceum

=== Culture ===
- Belozerske Cultural and Leisure Center
- Music School
- Children's and Youth Creativity Center

=== Sports ===
- Sports Palace
- Stadium

=== Attractions ===
- Monument to soldiers who died fighting against the Nazi invaders
- Monument to internationalist soldiers ("Afghans")
- Monument to the liquidators of the Chernobyl accident
- Monument to fallen miners
- Monument to Alexander the First
- Park

== Notable people ==
- Yuri Globa -
- Oleksandr Perviy - Soviet weightlifter, Olympic, World and European Championships medalist.

== Gallery ==
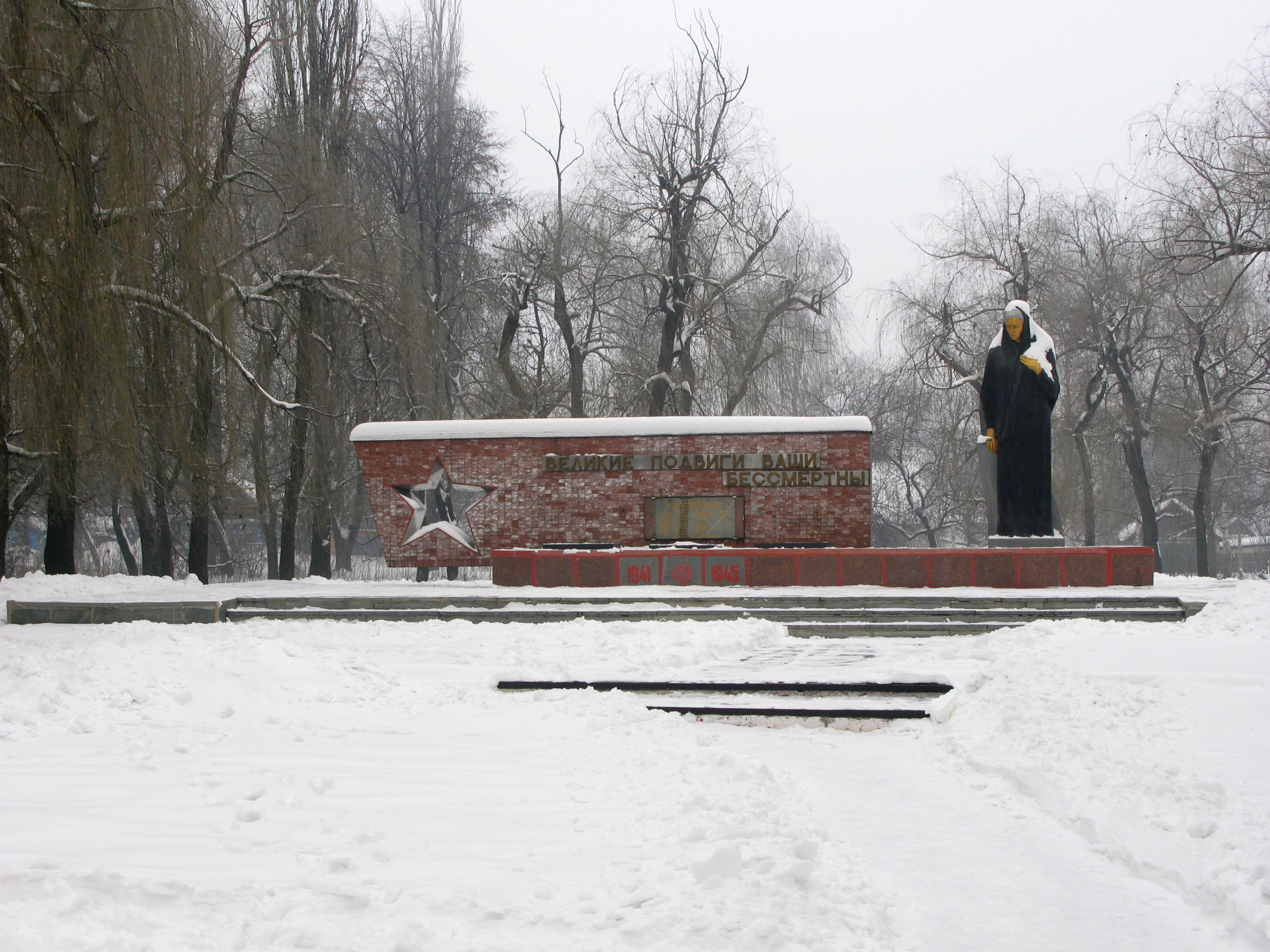
War memorial in Bilozerske

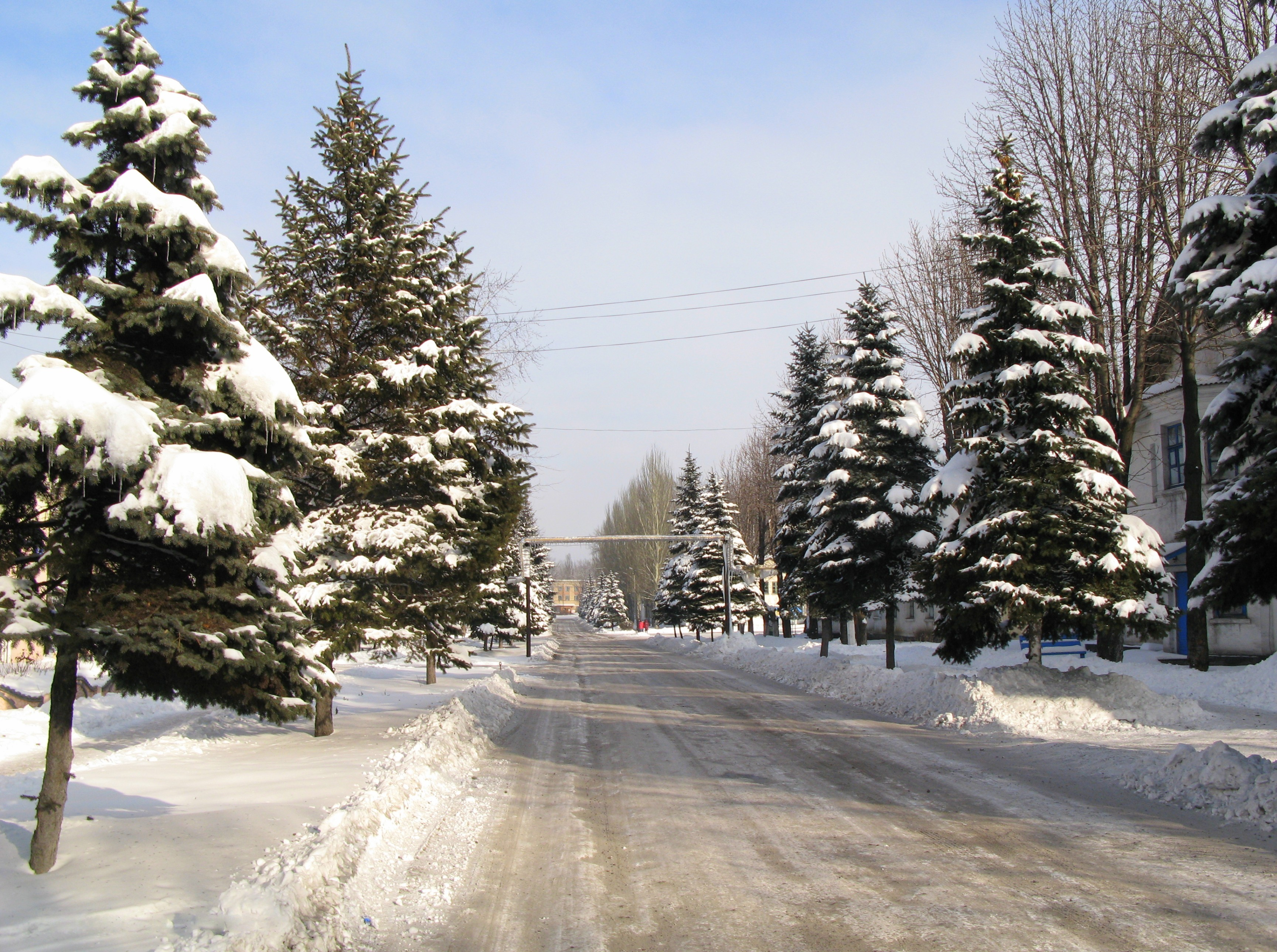
Bilozerske in Winter

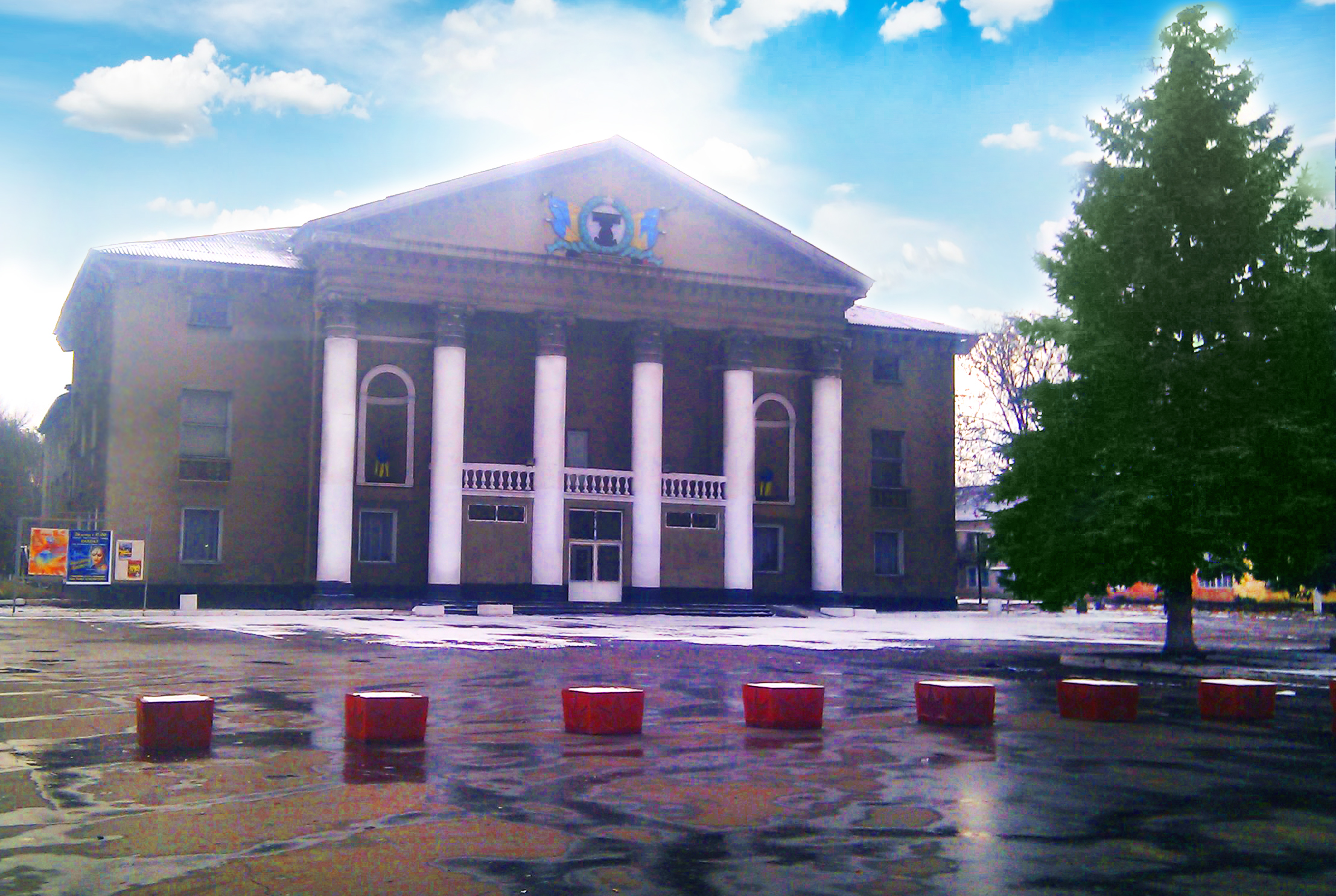
City Palace of Culture

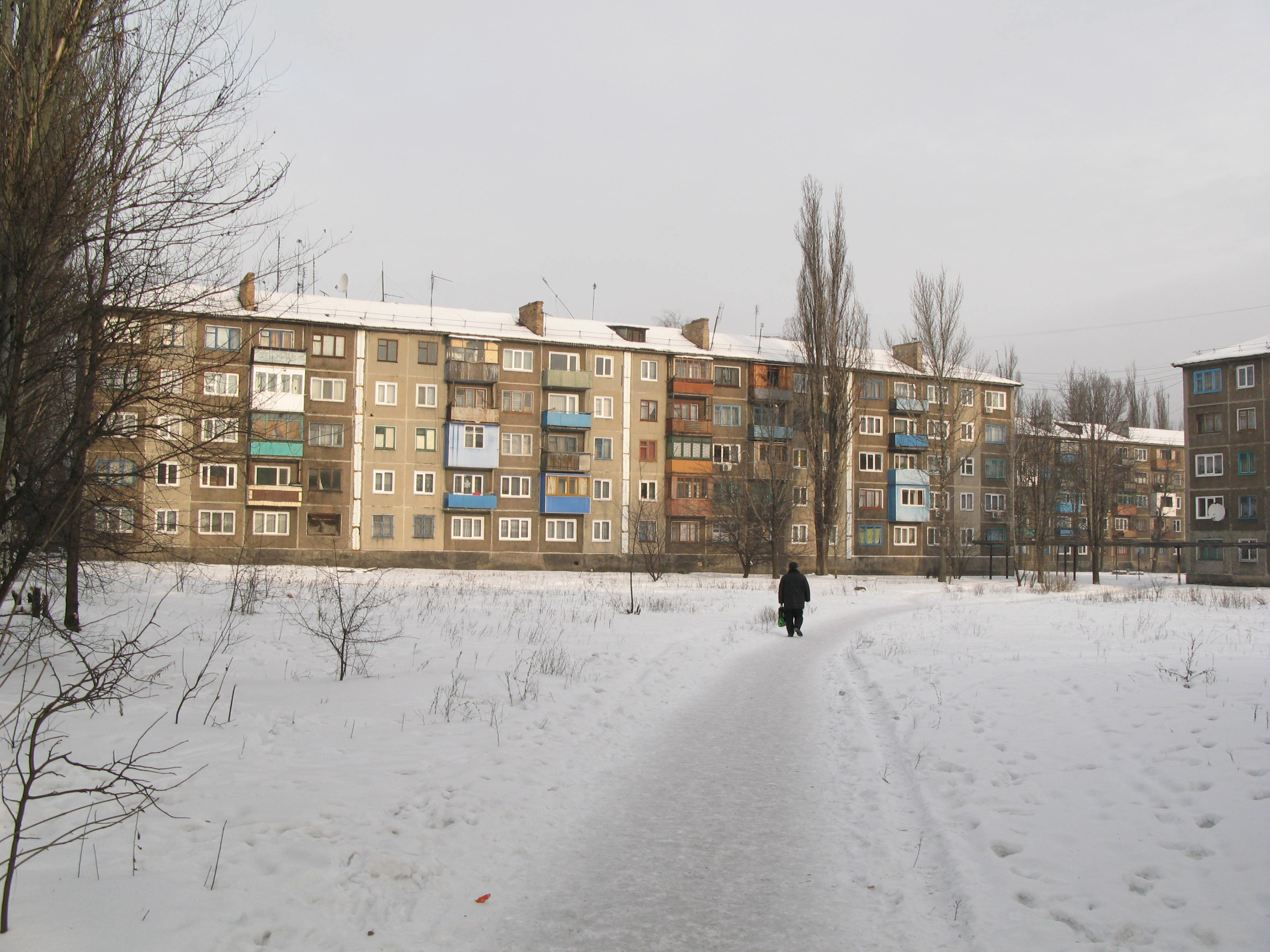
Blocks of flats in Bilozerske
