= The 2025 Queerties Awards =

Awards for contributions by LGBTQ+ community

- Awarded for: contributions and achievements by members of the LGBTQ+ community.
- Sponsored by: Lexus
- Date: March 11, 2025
- Venue: The Avalon Hollywood, LA
- Country: United States
- Presented by: Queerty
- Hosted by: Bob the Drag Queen

Highlights
- Most wins: Chappell Roan; Wicked; (2)
- Website: queerty.com/queerties/

Television/radio coverage
- Produced by: Q.Digital

The 2025 Queerties Awards took place on March 11, 2025, at The Avalon Hollywood in Los Angeles, hosted by Bob the Drag Queen. The 13th annual edition honored the LGBTQ+ community's brightest stars and innovators in entertainment, and were chosen by the public throughout Queerty's website.

Honorees included Cole Escola with the Icon Award, Wilson Cruz with the Catalyst Award, Murray Hill with the Traillblazer Award, and Marissa Bode with the Groundbreaker Award. The biggest winners of the night included American singer-songwriter Chappell Roan, and the film Wicked, each one winning two awards.

== Winners and nominees ==
The full nominations were announced on January 28, 2025:

Music

Breakout Musical Artist
Luxx Noir London; Towa Bird (Runner-Up); Shygirl; Peach PRC; Kevin Atwater; Cody Belew; Orion Sun; Young Miko; Joy Oladokun; Katie Gavin
Music Video	Anthem
"Talk" — Omar Rudberg; "Hell Together" — David Archuleta (Runner-Up); "Alright" — Victoria Monét; "Bootz" — Salina EsTitties; "Heat" — Tove Lo and SG Lewis; "Trust" — Rebecca Black; "Green Lights" — Michaela Jaé; "Heatwave" — Bronze Avery; "Small Town Scandal" — Zolita	"Good Luck, Babe!" — Chappell Roan; "She's Such a B*tch" — Mirage (Runner-Up); "Nissan Altima" — Doechii; "Talk Talk" — Charli xcx and Troye Sivan; "Midnight Ride" — Kylie Minogue, Orville Peck and Diplo; "Nasty" — Tinashe; "Spite" — Omar Apollo; "A Twink and a Redhead" — Grant & Ash; "Sex with Myself" — JORDY; "Ultra High Def Lover" — Bentley Robles and Madison Rose

Television/Streaming

TV Performance
Aubrey Plaza — Agatha All Along; Yasmin Finney — Heartstopper (Runner-Up); Ncuti Gatwa — Doctor Who; Harvey Guillén — What We Do In The Shadows; Cooper Koch — Monsters: The Lyle and Erik Menendez Story; Emma D'Arcy — House of the Dragon; Andrew Scott — Ripley; Niecy Nash-Betts — Grotesquerie; Zachary Quinto — Brilliant Minds; Ricky Martin — Palm Royale
TV Comedy (presented by Lexus)	TV Drama
Heartstopper; Agatha All Along (Runner-Up); Abbott Elementary; What We Do In The Shadows; Hacks; Only Murders in the Building; The Sex Lives of College Girls; Somebody Somewhere; Palm Royale; No Good Deed	Baby Reindeer; Interview with the Vampire (Runner-Up); Doctor Who; 9-1-1; House of the Dragon; X-Men '97; Elite; Black Doves; The Acolyte; Star Trek: Discovery
Reality TV	Web Series
RuPaul's Drag Race; Trixie Motel: Drag Me Home (Runner-Up); The Traitors; We're Here; I Kissed A Girl; The Boyfriend; House of Villains; Couple to Throuple; Live from the Other Side with Tyler Henry; For the Love of DILFS	Dungeons & Drag Queens; IMHO: The Show (Runner-Up); Very Important People; Monét's Slumber Party; Stuff Every Queer Kid Should Know; Bring Back My Girls; Spill with Johnny Sibilly; Natives; The Terrell Show; Off Shoot

Films

Film Performance
Jonathan Bailey — Wicked; Lady Gaga — Joker: Folie À Deux (Runner-Up); Justice Smith — I Saw the TV Glow; Hunter Schafer — Cuckoo; Elliot Page — Close to You; Colman Domingo — Sing Sing; Maisy Stella — My Old Ass; Katy O'Brian — Love Lies Bleeding; Julio Torres — Problemista; Karla Sofía Gascón — Emilia Pérez
Comedy Movie	Drama Movie
The Substance; Challengers (Runner-Up); My Old Ass; Will & Harper; Lisa Frankenstein; Problemista; Drive-Away Dolls; The People's Joker; Extremely Unique Dynamic; Stress Positions	Wicked; I Saw the TV Glow (Runner-Up); Queer; Love Lies Bleeding; Femme; Monkey Man; High Tide; National Anthem; Slave Play. Not A Movie. A Play.; Emilia Pérez

Drag

Drag Royalty	Future All-Star
Sasha Colby; Alyssa Edwards (Runner-Up); Sasha Velour; Roxxxy Andrews; Nicky Doll; Angeria Paris VanMicheals; Asia Consent; Varla Jean Merman; Kandy Muse; Andro Gin	Plane Jane; Tayce (Runner-Up); Crystal Methyd; Sugar & Spice; Sapphira Cristál; Morphine Love Dion; Maddy Morphosis; Dawn; Xunami Muse; Olivia Lux

Miscellaneous

TikToker	Theater
Sasha Allen (@SASH1E); Anania (@Anania00) Runner-Up; Jools Lebron (@JoolieAnnie); Jake Shane (@OctopussLover8); Cosmo Lombino (@Cosmo_Queen_of_Melrose); Tanner Devore (@TannerTan36); Khian Brown (@Khian.KB); RaeShanda Lias (@Shopaif); Briel Adams-Wheatley (@No_Limbs_); Allison Reese (@AlienReese)	Drag: The Musical; Romeo + Juliet (Runner-Up); Cabaret at the Kit Kat Club; Oh, Mary!; Death Becomes Her; La Cage Aux Folles; Cats: The Jellicle Ball; Gypsy; Discoshow; The Big Gay Jamboree
Coming Out for Good	Style Icon
Detox; Sasheer Zamata (Runner-Up); Khalid; Chloë Grace Moretz; Trey Cunningham; Ilana Glazer; Maren Morris; Amber Ruffin; Fujii Kaze; Jermelle Simon	Janelle Monáe; Alex Consani (Runner-Up); Gigi Goode; Matt Bomer; Billy Porter; Laverne Cox; Colman Domingo; Tom Ford; Zaldy; Paul Tazewell
Badass	Sports Hero
Chappell Roan; Joe Locke (Runner-Up); Cynthia Erivo; Sarah McBride; Megan Thee Stallion; Nymphia Wind; Billie Eilish; Sha'Carri Richardson; Alan Cumming; Nava Mau	Tom Daley; Amber Glenn (Runner-Up); Raven Saunders; Diana Taurasi; Haleigh Washington; Jack Woolley; Jewell Loyd; Nikki Hiltz; Nico Young; Tierna Davidson
Podcast	Read
Very Delta by Delta Work; A Bit Fruity by Matt Bernstein (Runner-Up); Las Culturistas by Matt Rogers and Bowen Yang; Gender Spiral by Ally Beardsley and Babette Thomas; Bad Dates by Joel Kim Booster; That's a Gay Ass Podcast by Eric Williams; Tell Me Something Messy by Brandon Kyle Goodman; Jockular by ER Fightmaster, Katie Kershaw & Tien Tran; Lovett or Leave It by Jon Lovett; The Pants Pod by Leisha Hailey & Kate Moenning	The House of Hidden Meanings by RuPaul; The T in LGBT by Jamie Raines (Runner-Up); How to Build a Fashion Icon by Law Roach; Boy from the Valleys: My Unexpected Journey by Luke Evans; Coming Home by Brittney Griner; American Teenager by Nico Lang; The Queer Arab Glossary by Marwan Kaabour; Rebel Girl by Kathleen Hanna; It Gets Better... Except When It Gets Worse by Nicole Maines; I Once Was Lost by Don Lemon
Comic	Insta-Follow
Wanda Sykes; Caleb Hearon (Runner-Up); Fortune Feimster; The Mean Gays: Aaron Goldenberg & Jake Jonez; Hannah Einbinder; Roz Hernandez; Jes Tom; EJ Marcus; Sam Jay; Dylan Adler	The Aids Memorial (@TheAidsMemorial); Eric Sedeño (@ricotaquito) (Runner-Up); Frankie Grande (@FrankieJGrande); Art Bezrukavenko (@itsartbezrukavenko); Mikey Angelo (@MrGrandeOfficial); Zane Phillips (@Zanethan); Rickey Thompson (@RickeyThompson); Alok Vaid-Menon (@Alokvmenon); Nikita Redkar (@Nikitadumptruck); Tee Sanders (@TeeSandersComedy)
Next Big Thing
Wicked: For Good; Red, White & Royal Blue 2 (Runner-Up); The Last of Us: Season 2; Wednesday: Season 2; M3GAN 2.0; Wake Up Dead Man: A Knives Out Mystery; Mid-Century Modern; P-Valley: Season 3; Snow White; The Wedding Banquet

Honors

Groundbreaker	Icon	Catalyst	Traillblazer
Marissa Bode	Cole Escola	Wilson Cruz	Murray Hill

== Most wins ==
List of two or more winners:

Field	Nominees	Wins	Awards
Artists	Chappell Roan	2	Badass; Anthem ("Good Luck, Babe!")
Film	Wicked	2	Drama Movie; Film Performance (Jonathan Bailey)

== Most nominations ==
List of most nominated individuals, and projects:

Field	Nominees	Total
Artists	Chappell Roan, Colman Domingo	2
TV	Agatha All Along, Doctor Who, Heartstoppers, House of Dragons, Palm Royale, What We Do In the Shadows	2
Film	Wicked, My Old Ass, I Saw the TV Glow, Emilia Pérez, Problemista, Love Lies Bleeding	2
