= 2025 Dobropillia offensive =

2025 military operation during the Russo-Ukrainian war

- Part of the Pokrovsk offensive of the Russo-Ukrainian war
- Aftermath of the offensive, with the upper blue section denoting the territory initially seized by Russia before being recaptured by Ukraine
Date	11 August – 29 November 2025 (3 months, 2 weeks and 4 days)
Location	Settlements east and southeast of Dobropillia in Pokrovsk Raion, Donetsk Oblast, Ukraine
Result	Status quo ante bellum (initial Russian gains reversed)

Belligerents
Russia	Ukraine

Units involved
Russian Armed Forces; Russian Ground Forces; 51st Guards Combined Arms Army; 1st Separate Guards Motor Rifle Brigade; 5th Separate Guards Motor Rifle Brigade; 56th Separate Special Purpose Battalion; 110th Separate Guards Motor Rifle Brigade; 132nd Guards Motor Rifle Brigade; 8th Guards Combined Arms Army; 57th Spetsnaz Company; 68th Guards Army Corps; Smuglyanka Detachment	Armed Forces of Ukraine; National Guard of Ukraine; 1st Azov Corps; Rubizh Brigade; Ukrainian Ground Forces; 1st Assault Battalion; 93rd Mechanized Brigade

Strength
200–300 (initial infiltration); 100,000–110,000 (on the Pokrovsk front)	Unknown

Casualties and losses
Per Ukraine: 12,492 killed, 8,346 wounded and 185 captured Equipment losses: 93 tanks, 259 AFVs and 314 artillery pieces	Unknown

The 2025 Dobropillia offensive was a military operation during the Russo-Ukrainian war by the Russian Armed Forces, with the primary goal of capturing the strategic city of Dobropillia in western Donetsk Oblast. The offensive lasted from 11 August to 29 November 2025, ending in status quo ante bellum with initial Russian gains reversed and all involved settlements returning to Ukrainian control.

The offensive separated itself from the Pokrovsk offensive to the south on 11 August 2025 after a major Russian ground assault was launched northeast of Rodynske. The first day saw Russian forces capture a 15 km (9.3 mi) strip of land around 6 km (3.7 mi) wide including three villages, which additionally severed the highway connecting Dobropillia to the city of Kramatorsk. Russian forces' tactics including small units of Russian forces penetrating the frontline before larger assaults, Russian numerical advantages, and Ukrainian infantry shortages at this part of the frontline were credited with making the Russian offensive initially successful. The deployment of Ukrainian elite troops including the 1st Azov Corps and other Ukrainian reserves, however, saw Russian forces ultimately pushed back from all of their initially captured positions from the start of the offensive, with the notable encirclement and mass surrender of over fifty Russians in the village of Kucheriv Yar taking place near the end of the offensive. While Russia never denounced its ambitions of capturing Dobropillia, the loss of its territory towards the city gained in August, alongside a statement by Ukrainian Lieutenant General Oleh Apostol on 29 November 2025, marked the end of the offensive.

Diplomatically, a number of media outlets additionally stated the offensive was likely launched to place Russia at a better position in peace negotiations for the then-upcoming 2025 Russia–United States Summit. After Ukrainian counterattacks produced results, however, the narrative changed and the offensive's lack of success was used to raise morale by President Zelenskyy.

== Background ==
Since 2024, the Russian army had been carrying out a year-long operation to capture the strategic city of Pokrovsk. By July 2025, the offensive gained some momentum when Russian forces were able to advance on the eastern and northern flanks, in an effort to fully encircle the city. This offensive separated itself from the northern flank of the Pokrovsk offensive following a major assault northeast of Rodynske.

== Offensive ==
=== Initial Russian breakthrough ===
Starting on 11 August, the Russian Armed Forces launched a major ground assault from their salient northeast of Rodynske and Pokrovsk in the direction of Dobropillia. The initial breakthrough was caused by small units of Russian soldiers, originating from a base in Selydove, penetrating the Ukrainian defenses after around two weeks of walking before uniting into a larger unit of between 200 and 300 soldiers past the frontline. This tactic had been used by Russia before during their offensive around Pokrovsk. At first it was unclear whether these groups were able to consolidate their positions. Russian units were reportedly operating in Kucheriv Yar, Vesele and in the vicinity of Zolotyi Kolodiaz. Russian assault squads additionally advanced close to the Dobropillia – Kramatorsk highway. Despite these reports, the Strategic Group Dnipro stated that these infiltrations were "not taking control of the territory". The OSINT map DeepStateMap.Live updated their map to show a 15 km (9.3 mi) strip of land around 6 km (3.7 mi) wide had been taken since earlier advances north of Pokrovsk on 7 August. The Ukrainian military denied reports of a breakthrough to the north of Pokrovsk and into the direction of Dobropillia.

The next day, it was confirmed that Russian forces were able to breach the main Ukrainian defense line in the area with an advance up to 10 km (six miles) towards Dobropillia. During the advance Russian assault groups reportedly entered at least nine settlements. Analysts noted that this was Russia's biggest advance in one day since May 2024. A local Ukrainian commander told CNN that small Russian units infiltrate the Ukrainian defense line looking for weak spots. He also added that some of Ukraine's defense positions consist of two-man positions, which solely rely on resupply by drones. Ukrainian Commander-in-Chief, Oleksandr Syrskyi, reported that additional assets and personnel had been sent to the area to combat the offensive. In addition, the 1st Azov Corps was being deployed in the direction of the Dobropillia – Kramatorsk highway, reliving the overstretched Pokrovsk Tactical Group on this area of the frontline. Due to the swift Russian push, many of the remaining residents in Dobropillia started to flee the city. The Ukrainian authorities announced a mandatory evacuation of families with children in the Bilozerske community on 13 August. On the same day, the Russian Defence Ministry announced the control over the villages of Nykanorivka and Zatyshok, both located to the southeast of Dobropillia. By the end of 13 August, the ISW assessed that Russian forces continued to operate in a dozen of settlements to the east and northeast of Dobropillia. However, they emphasized that the Russian presence in the area does not denote full control of the territory.

=== Ukrainian counteroffensive ===
The Ukrainian General Staff said on 14 August that their forces halted the Russian advance in the direction of Dobropillia city. During the counter combat operations the 1st Azov Corps claimed to have killed 151 Russian soldiers over the past two days. The Governor of Donetsk Oblast, Vadym Filashkin, stated that the situation near Dobropillia stabilised. He also announced the mandatory evacuations of families from the city of Druzhkivka. Following the deployment of significant reserves in the area, the Ukrainian army managed to stem further Russian advances. On top of that, Ukrainian forces launched a counterattack on the Russian salient east of Dobropillia and restored control over the settlements along the Dobropillia – Kramatorsk highway as well as the villages of Hruzke, Rubizhne, Vesele and Zolotyi Kolodiaz by 17 August. One day later, geolocated footage showed Russian units advancing northeast of Kucheriv Yar, indicating Russian control over the village.

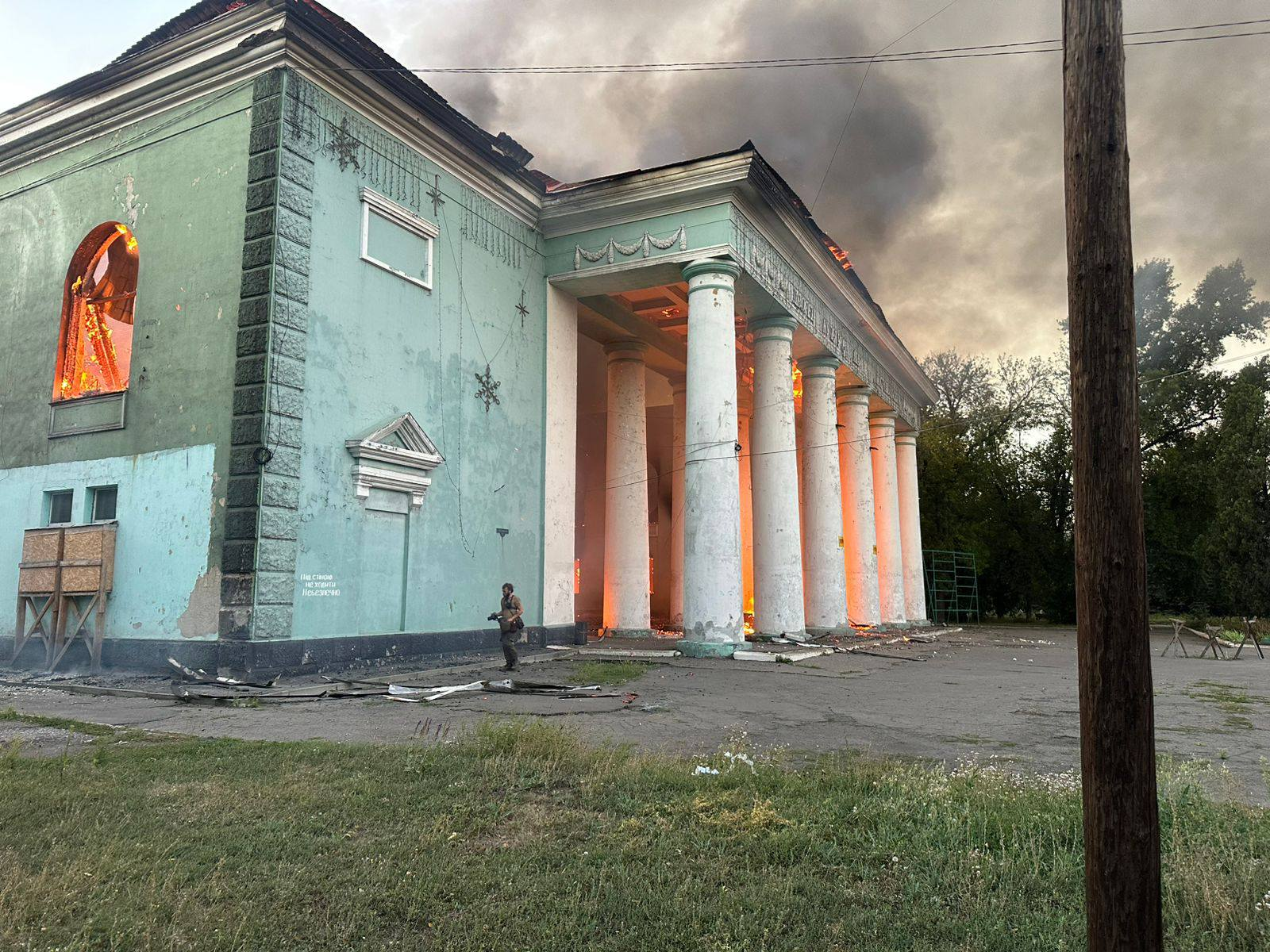
Palace of Culture in Dobropillia after Russian attack in September 2025

In the second week of the offensive, Russian forces started advancing from Poltavka to the northwest, in an attempt to flank Shakhove and Volodymyrivka from the east. The Russian military said its forces had captured Pankivka, located southwest of Shakhove, on 20 August. On the other hand, the Ukrainian military claimed to have surrounded a Russian unit near Dobropillia. In early September, Russian forces advanced into southern Volodymyrivka. Ukrainian troops were able to push the Russians out of the settlement by 8 September. The next week, Ukrainian forces recaptured the village of Pankivka. The Ukrainian army continued pressing the Russian salient east of Dobropillia by the end of September. According to Ukrainian Commander-in-Chief Syrskyi, Ukrainian forces recaptured 175 square kilometers during their counteroffensive operations. He additionally reported that several Russian units were encircled.

In early October, the Russian army renewed their assaults towards Shakhove and reentered Pankivka and the southern parts of Volodymyrivka. One week later, Ukrainian forces were able to repel a Russian company-sized mechanized assault heading towards Shakhove by destroying a column of armored vehicles. The ISW noted that Russia has increasingly been conducting mechanized assaults in this sector. Further to the northwest, units of the Ukrainian 132nd Separate Reconnaissance Battalion recaptured the village of Kucheriv Yar by 22 October. Over 50 Russian soldiers were captured by Ukrainian troops during the operation. A few days later on 25 October, the Ukrainian 82nd Separate Air Assault Brigade retook the village of Sukhetske located north of Rodynske as a supporting effort of the counteroffensive. By 26 October, DeepStateMap.Live updated their map to display that the final Russian forces in Kucheriv Yar, Sukhetske, and Zatyshok had been eliminated and the villages recaptured.

On 29 November 2025, Commander of the Air Assault Forces of the Armed Forces of Ukraine, Lieutenant General Oleh Apostol, officially announced on national television the end of the Ukrainian counteroffensive operation, further stating Ukraine's objectives to end the Dobropillia offensive had been met. While this was the official announcement made regarding the end of the offensive, some sources had claimed the offensive had ended as far back as early October, and even more after the recapture of Kucheriv Yar in late October.

== Analysis ==
With this development of events, if it does not change, we may encounter a situation where Dobropillia falls faster than Pokrovsk.

— DeepStateMap.Live, in a report the day the major assault began

The straight-line offensive was reported by Ukrainian Armed Forces officer Andriy Tkachuk as likely an attempt to split Ukrainian forces at this part of the frontline in half, further reporting the situation as "very difficult". The Institute for the Study of War reported while there were tactical gains, an "operational-level breakthrough" had yet to occur. Conversely, RBC-Ukraine reported the assault had worsened for Ukrainian forces due officers on this area of the front reporting the assault was "under control" or otherwise "not grasp[ing] the full scale of the problem". DeepState reported the "situation remains chaotic" with "Russian forces quickly establish[ing] positions [to] accumulate troops for further advances". Left unchecked, DeepState further reported the assault placed Dobropillia in "immediate danger", places the city of Pokrovsk in threat of encirclement, and threatens Kostiantynivka from a new direction. Despite both DeepStateMap.Live and Ukrainian National News reporting that Russian forces were suffering heavy casualties in their advance, Russian numerical advantages and Ukrainian infantry shortages at this part of the frontline allows the assault to still remain successful, and further makes it unlikely for Ukrainians to cut off and encircle the advancing Russian units.

We see that the Russian army is not preparing to end the war. On the contrary, they are making movements that indicate preparations for new offensive operations

— Volodymyr Zelenskyy, in a post on X on 12 August

Diplomatically; Time Magazine, RBC-Ukraine, and Ukrainian President Zelenskyy stated the timing of the major assault was likely arranged to precede the upcoming 2025 Russia–United States Summit between Russian President Putin and US President Trump on 15 August to place Russia at a better position in peace negotiations. By October 2025, President Zelenskyy had begun to use the counteroffensive as a moral boost to Ukrainians, claiming the Armed Forces had inflicted 12,000 losses, including 7,000 killed, and successfully ended the Russian offensive campaign for the summer.

== See also ==
- 2026 Dobropillia offensive
- List of military engagements during the Russian invasion of Ukraine
- Battle of Chasiv Yar
- Novopavlivka offensive
