= Krasnyi Lyman, Pokrovsk Raion, Donetsk Oblast =

Krasnyi Lyman Красний Лиман
- Village
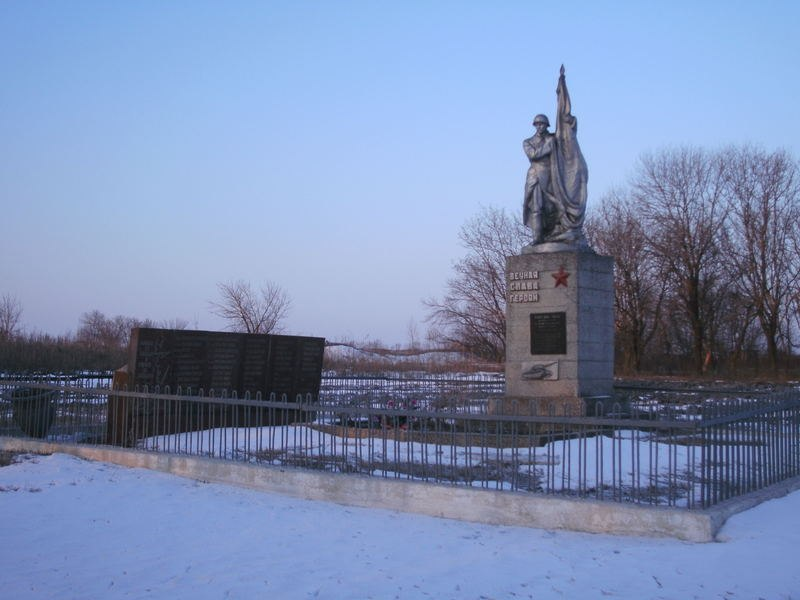
- Mass grave of Soviet soldiers in Krasnyi Lyman

- Location of Krasnyi Lyman Krasnyi Lyman (Ukraine)
- Country: Ukraine
- Oblast: Donetsk Oblast
- Raion: Pokrovsk Raion
- Hromada: Myrnohrad urban hromada

Population (2001)
  - Total: 592
- Time zone: UTC+2 (EET)
  - Summer (DST): UTC+3 (EEST)
- Postal code: 85311
- Area code: +380 6235
- Climate: Dfa

Krasnyi Lyman (Ukrainian: Красний Лиман) is a village in Myrnohrad urban hromada, Pokrovsk Raion, Donetsk Oblast, Ukraine. 592 population in the village at the 2001 Ukrainian census.

== History ==
Many of the village's residents fled during the Russian invasion of Ukraine due to Russian advances near the village. In September 2024 the population had reportedly decreased to 92.

== Demographics ==
According to the 2001 Ukrainian census, the village had a population of 592, of whom 50.34% spoke Ukrainian, 48.65% spoke Russian, 0.51% spoke Armenian, and 0.34% spoke Polish.
