= Vodianske =

Urban locality in Donetsk Oblast, Ukraine

Vodianske Водянське
- Rural settlement
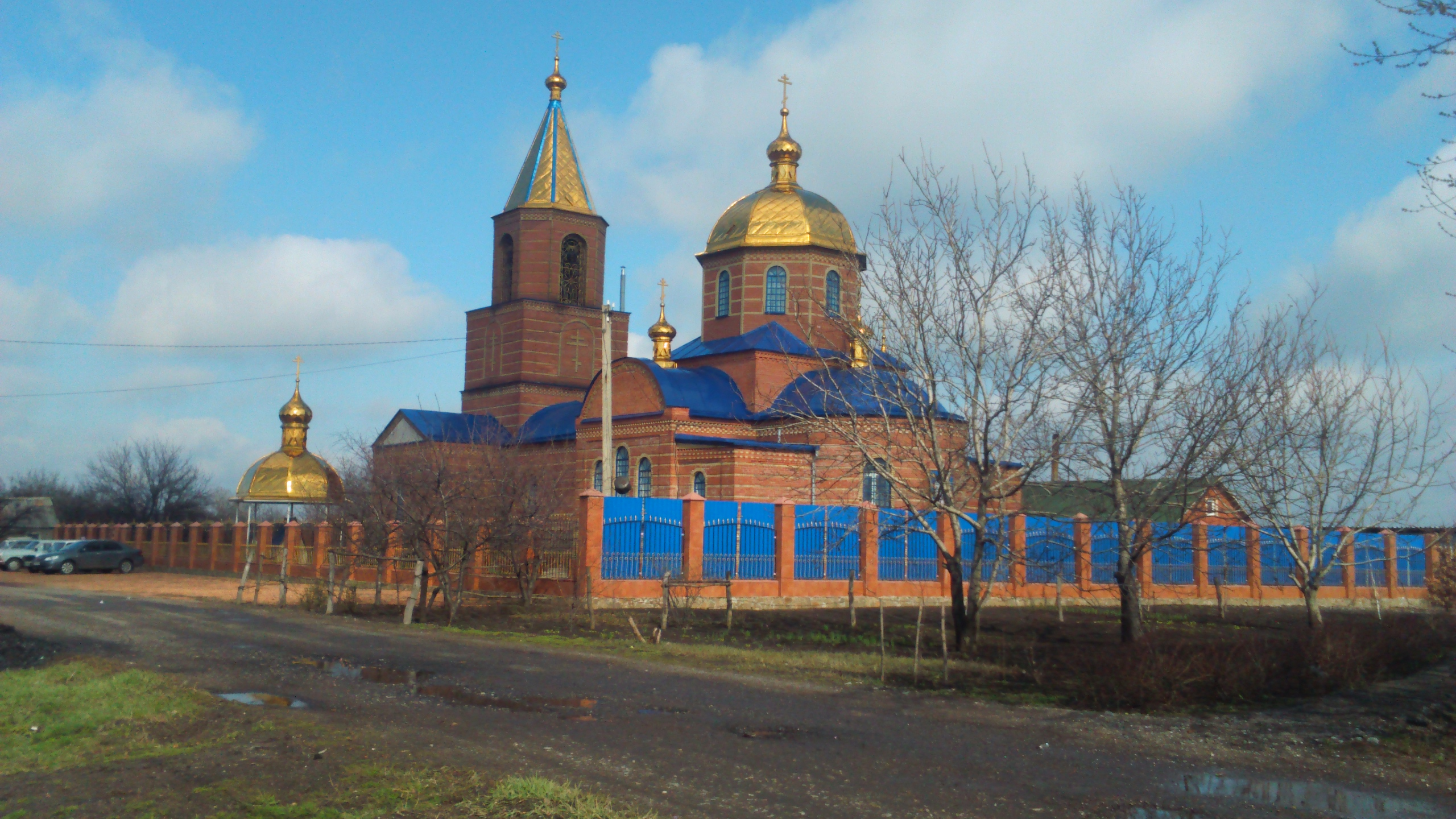
- Interactive map of Vodianske
- Location of Vodianske within Donetsk Oblast#Location of Vodianske within Ukraine Vodianske (Ukraine)
- Coordinates: 48°24′34″N 37°06′15″E
- Country: Ukraine
- Oblast: Donetsk Oblast
- Raion: Pokrovsk Raion
- Hromada: Dobropillia urban hromada
- Founded: 18 February 1954
- Elevation: 151 m (495 ft)

Population (2022)
  - Total: 1,373
  - Estimate (June 2026): 20
- Time zone: UTC+2 (EET)
  - Summer (DST): UTC+3 (EEST)
- Postal code: 85040-85041
- Area code: +380 6277

Vodianske (Ukrainian: Водянське) is a rural settlement in Pokrovsk Raion, Donetsk Oblast, eastern Ukraine. The population is 1,373 (2022 estimate).

== History ==
=== Early history ===
On the map of Bakhmutsky district by M. Griner in 1915, the village of Olimpiadovsk was indicated, which was located in the southeastern part of the current village.

=== Soviet period ===
The village of Vodyanske arose in the early 1950s as a small settlement for the Vodyan-1 mine workers. The location of the village was chosen in the lowland near the Kulichka river, a tributary of the Vodyana river.

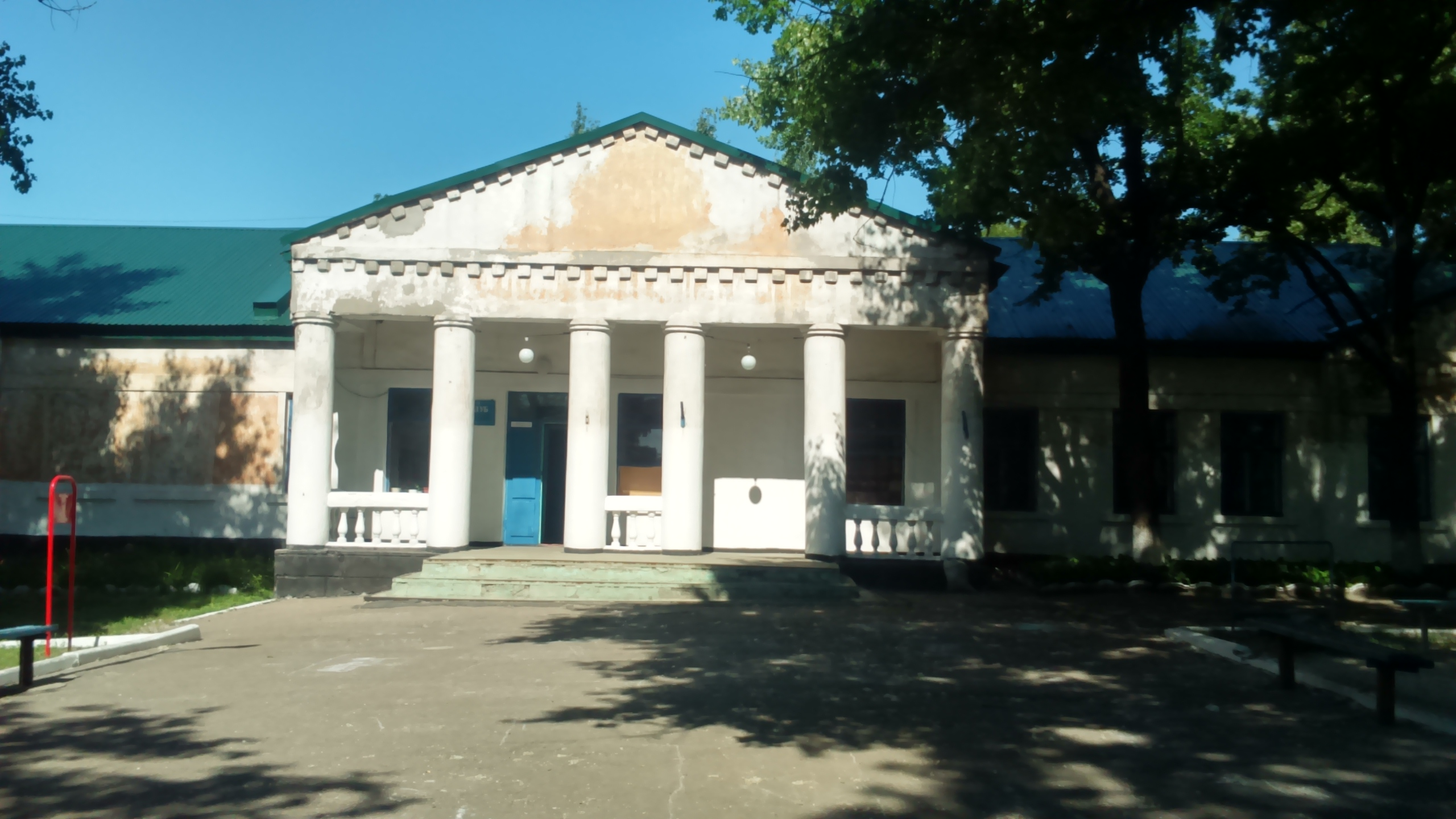
Vodyanskoe Culture House

A dormitory and a shop were the first buildings. In 1954, the first tons of coal began to be produced by the Vodyan-1 mine. In 1954, a school was built. The first director of the school was the former partisan of the S. A. Kovpak detachment— I. V. Ostryanin.

On September 14, 1956, by the decision of the Stalin Regional Executive Committee "On the classification of individual settlements of the Stalin region into the category of urban-type settlements", the settlements of the coal mines "Bilytska" and "Vodyana 1" were classified into the category of urban-type settlements with the name Bilytska and the settlement council was named Bilytska.

On June 24, 1957, the settlement of the mine "Vodyana-1" received the status of an urban-type settlement and the name— Vodyanske. It was subordinated to the Dobropil City Council.

In 1957, the Vodyana-2 mine began producing coal. The village grew significantly. The Kirov Club, a kindergarten, well-equipped residential buildings, and shops were built here. A library was opened (the first librarian was N.A. Krasnonos).

In 1957, a village hospital with a medical outpatient clinic and a 30-bed hospital was opened. Its chief physician was P.O. Melnyk, until he was transferred to the position of chief physician of the Bilytsk City Hospital in 1966.

Among the first residents of the village of Vodianske were former front-line soldiers, A. I. Lyubas, V. P. Chernyshov, I. Ya. Mukhin, M. Ya. Kamchatny, O. O. Pozhydayev, V. I. Terekhov, V. S. Mohylny.

In 1962, the Central Electromechanical Workshops (CEMM) of the Dobropillyavugollia Trust were opened on the basis of the Vodyana-2 mine, which was merged with the Vodyana-1 mine.

In 1966, the village of Bilytske received the status of a city, and the village of Vodianske was subordinated to the Bilytske City Council. In the same year, the Vodiansk school became secondary, and in 1968 gave its first graduation. Among the first teachers of the school were: Ya. A. Kovtun, A. V. Berro, K. R. Globchanska, E. P. Pylypets. In 1969 g. 3.1 thousand people lived in the village of Vodianske. The mine "Vodyana-1" was merged with the mine named after the 21st Congress of the CPSU. A branch of the Donetsk Precision Machine-Building Plant (DZTM) was opened in the village. But the majority of the male population worked at the mine, which in the early 70s was again called "Bilytska".

In the 70s and 80s, the village of Vodianske was a mining settlement, with green streets, a pond, and a municipal service, which was headed for many years by A. I. Lyubas.

=== Independent Ukraine ===
On December 22, 2014, DPR militants of the unit "Oplot", were active in the region. In the village of Vodianske, they killed a family and stole a car. The militants were detained on December 30, and during interrogation stated that they had left Donetsk on the instructions of their leaders for territory controlled by Ukraine.

== Demographics ==
Native language as of the Ukrainian Census of 2001:

Language	Percentage
Ukrainian	72.87 %
Russian	27.01 %
Armenian	0.12 %
