= Dobropillia urban hromada =

Dobropillia urban hromada Добропільська міська громада
- Hromada
- Interactive map of Dobropillia urban hromada
- Country: Ukraine
- Oblast: Donetsk Oblast
- Raion: Pokrovsk Raion

Area
  - Total: 265.5 km^{2} (102.5 sq mi)

Population (2020)
  - Total: 43,827
  - Density: 165.1/km^{2} (427.5/sq mi)
- Settlements: 16
- Cities: 2
- Rural settlements: 6
- Villages: 8

Dobropillia urban hromada (Ukrainian: Добропільська міська громада) is a hromada of Ukraine, located in Pokrovsk Raion, Donetsk Oblast. Its administrative center is the city of Dobropillia.

It has an area of 265.5 square kilometres (102.5 mi^{2}) and a population of 43,827, as of 2020.

The hromada contains 16 settlements: 2 cities (Dobropillia and Bilytske), 6 rural settlements:

- Chernihivka
- Novyi Donbas
- Shevchenko
- Svitle
- Sviatohorivka
- Vodianske

And 8 villages:

- Hannivka
- Kopani
- Novoukrainka
- Novoviktorivka
- Rubizhne
- Stepy
- Viktorivka
- Virivka

== See also ==
- List of hromadas of Ukraine
