= Myrnohrad urban hromada =

Myrnohrad urban hromada Мирноградська міська громада
- Hromada
- Interactive map of Myrnohrad urban hromada
- Country: Ukraine
- Oblast: Donetsk
- Raion: Pokrovsk

Area
  - Total: 66.7 km^{2} (25.8 sq mi)

Population (2020)
  - Total: 48,894
  - Density: 733/km^{2} (1,900/sq mi)
- Settlements: 5
- Cities: 1
- Villages: 4

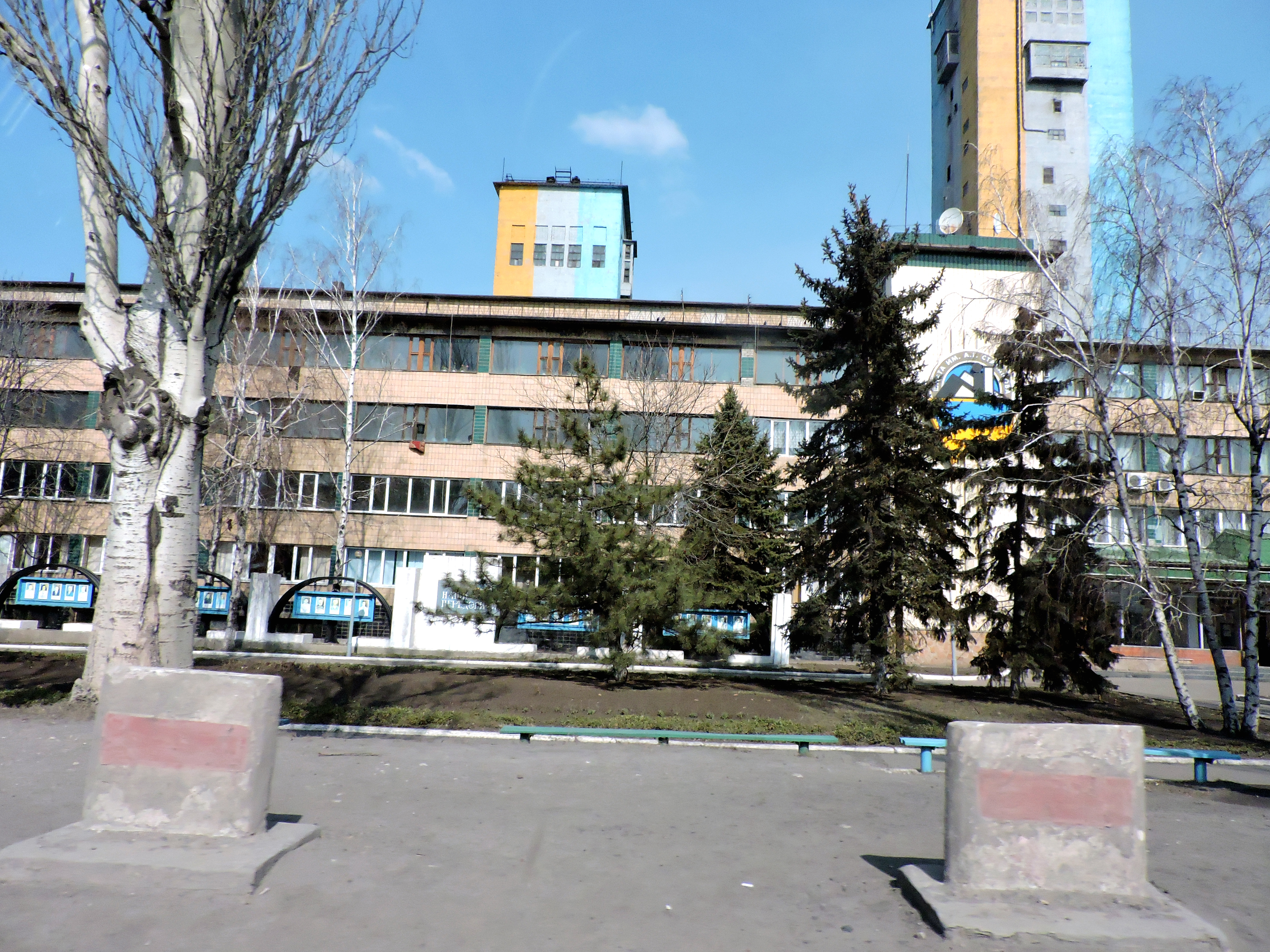
Stakhanov Coal Mine Administrative Building

Myrnohrad urban hromada (Ukrainian: Мирноградська міська громада) is a hromada of Ukraine, located in Pokrovsk Raion, Donetsk Oblast. Its administrative center is the city Myrnohrad.

It has an area of 66.7 square kilometres (25.8 mi^{2}) and a population of 48,894, as of 2020.

The hromada contains 5 settlements: 1 city (Myrnohrad) and 4 villages:

- Krasnyi Lyman
- Rivne
- Svitle
- Sukhetske

== See also ==
- List of hromadas of Ukraine
