= Bilozerske urban hromada =

Bilozerske urban hromada Білозерська міська громада
- Hromada
- Interactive map of Bilozerske urban hromada
- Country: Ukraine
- Oblast: Donetsk Oblast
- Raion: Pokrovsk Raion

Area
  - Total: 68.7 km^{2} (26.5 sq mi)

Population (2020)
  - Total: 15,738
  - Density: 229/km^{2} (593/sq mi)
- Settlements: 7
- Cities: 1
- Rural settlements: 1
- Villages: 5

Bilozerske urban hromada (Ukrainian: Білозерська міська громада) is a hromada of Ukraine, located in Pokrovsk Raion, Donetsk Oblast. Its administrative center is the city Bilozerske.

It has an area of 68.7 square kilometres (26.5 mi^{2}) and a population of 15,738, as of 2020.

The hromada contains 7 settlements: 1 city (Bilozerske), 1 rural settlement (Bokove), and 5 villages:

- Blahodat
- Myrove
- Novovodiane
- Vesele Pole
- Vesna

== See also ==
- List of hromadas of Ukraine
