= Art Bezrukavenko =

Ukrainian content creator and social media personality (born 1997)

- Артем Безрукавенко
- Born: 2 January 1997 (age 29); Dobropillia, Donetsk Oblast, Ukraine
- Education: Collegium Humanum – Warsaw Management University
- Occupations: Content creator; social media personality

Artem Bezrukavenko (Ukrainian: Артем Безрукавенко; born 2 January 1997) is a Ukrainian content creator and social media personality. His work focuses on topics related to LGBTQ+ experiences, identity, and community, often presented through street interviews, video podcasts, and online discussions.

== Early life and education ==
Bezrukavenko was born in Dobropillia in Donetsk Oblast, Ukraine. In 2014, after the annexation of Crimea by the Russian Federation, his family borrowed money to send him to Warsaw, Poland, with a three-month allowance. He enrolled at the Collegium Humanum – Warsaw Management University despite not speaking Polish at the time. To support himself, he worked multiple jobs and attended school simultaneously, which led to his temporary expulsion due to poor attendance, though he was later readmitted.

After six months, his mother joined him in Warsaw, where they lived in a studio apartment and worked alternating shifts. During this time, Bezrukavenko held various jobs, including distributing flyers, working as a receptionist, and serving as a sales associate.

== Career ==
Bezrukavenko immigrated to the United States in 2017 with US$500 (equivalent to $656.73 in 2025) in savings. Initially, he lived in cities including Chicago, Los Angeles, and Austin, Texas, taking on various jobs while navigating the immigration process.

In the U.S., Bezrukavenko began creating social media content. His early work did not focus on LGBTQ+ themes, but over time, he started incorporating topics related to queer identity and community issues. He began conducting street interviews and creating videos that explored topics such as relationships, identity, and LGBTQ+ culture.

Bezrukavenko's content gained an audience across platforms like TikTok, Instagram, and YouTube. By 2024, he had attracted a following, producing a range of videos from candid interviews to discussions on queer social dynamics. His projects included The Gays Of Our Days, a video podcast series featuring interviews with individuals from diverse backgrounds. He also hosted live streams where he interacted with viewers on various topics. He co-starred, co-wrote and co-directed two short gay films with fellow influencer Chris Stanley. "Second Thought" (2024) is the name of the first short. "Just Friends" (2025) is the second short.

== Personal life ==
Bezrukavenko credits his formative years in Warsaw, where he and his mother worked to establish a new life, with instilling resilience and a strong work ethic.
