= Dobropillia Raion =

Former subdivision of Donetsk Oblast, Ukraine

Dobropillia Raion Добропільський район
- Raion
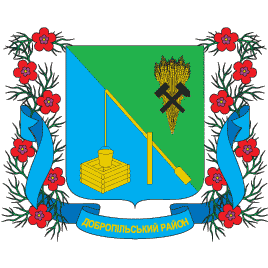
- Flag Coat of arms

- Coordinates: 48°28′59.8656″N 37°0′42.2886″E
- Country: Ukraine
- Region: Donetsk Oblast
- Disestablished: 18 July 2020
- Admin. center: Dobropillia
- Subdivisions: List: — city councils; — settlement councils; — rural councils; Number of localities: — cities; — urban-type settlements; 61 — villages; — rural settlements

Government
  - Governor: N/A

Area
  - Total: 949 km^{2} (366 sq mi)

Population (2020)
  - Total: 14,901
  - Density: 15.7/km^{2} (40.7/sq mi)
- Time zone: UTC+02:00 (EET)
  - Summer (DST): UTC+03:00 (EEST)
- Postal index: 873-XX
- Area code: 380
- Website: Verkhovna Rada website

Dobropillia Raion (Ukrainian: Добропільський район, romanized: Dobropil's'kyi raion; Russian: Добропо́льский район, romanized: Dobropol'skiy raion) was a raion (district) within the southwestern part of Donetsk Oblast in eastern Ukraine. Its administrative center was Dobropillia, which was incorporated separately as the town of oblast significance and did not belong to the raion. Its area was 949 km^{2} (366 sq mi). The raion was abolished on 18 July 2020 as part of the administrative reform of Ukraine, which reduced the number of raions of Donetsk Oblast to eight, of which only five were controlled by the government. The last estimate of the raion population was 14,901 (2020 est.).

Within Dobropillia Raion there were one urban-type settlement (Sviatohorivka - 2,100 inhabitants), 9 selsoviets, and 66 settlements. Also included within the raion were: 17 kolhozy, and 3 sovhozy, 4 industrial organizations, 4 construction organizations, 2 railroad stations, 44 Meduchredzheniy, and 47 libraries.

An architectural monument in the raion was a palace (1887-1914-selo Zelyenoe).

In May 2014, due to the deteriorating situation in the Donetsk Oblast, the raion requested a referendum pertaining to the transfer of Dobropillia Raion into the Dnipropetrovsk Oblast, where the situation was more stable. The then Dnipropetrovsk Governor Ihor Kolomoisky announced that the oblast would be willing to do so, assuming that was what the citizens had wanted.

== Settlements ==
- Vodianske
- Volodymyrivka
- Virovka
- Hannivka
- Zolotyi Kolodiaz
- Krasnoiarske
- Kryvorizhia
- Novyi Donbas
- Novovodiane
- Novodonetske
- Novotoretske
- Novotroitske
- Novofedorivka
- Oktiabrske
- Rozy Liuksemburh
- Sviatohorivka
- Svitle
- Shevchenko
- Shylivka

== Demographics ==
As of the 2001 Ukrainian census:

Ethnicity

- Ukrainians: 89.4%
- Russians: 8.9%

== See also ==
- Administrative divisions of Donetsk Oblast
