= Dobropillia =

City in Donetsk Oblast, Ukraine

Dobropillia Добропілля
- City
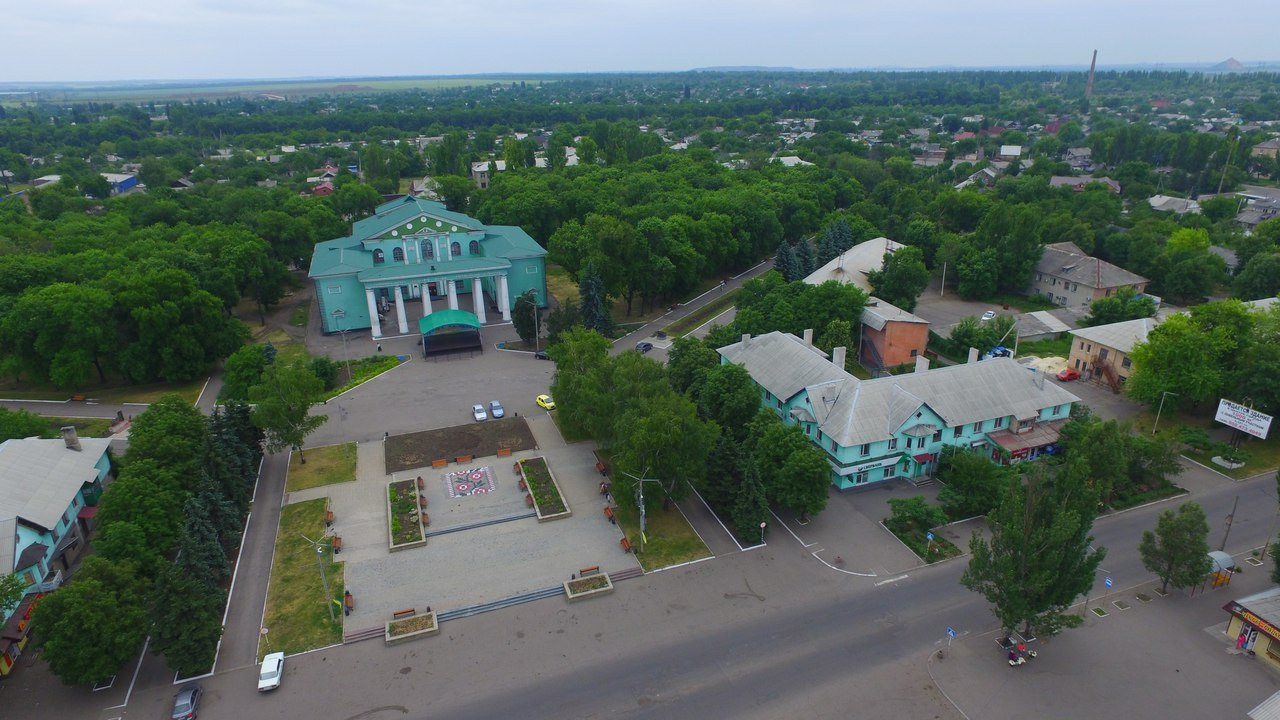
- Aerial view of Dobropillia (2018)

- Flag Coat of arms
- Interactive map of Dobropillia
- Location within Donetsk Oblast Location within Ukraine
- Coordinates: 48°28′08″N 37°04′58″E
- Country: Ukraine
- Oblast: Donetsk Oblast
- Raion: Pokrovsk Raion
- Hromada: Dobropillia urban hromada
- Foundation: 1840s
- City rights: 1953

Government
  - Mayor: Serhiy Bondarenko
- Area: 11.89 km^{2} (4.59 sq mi)
- Elevation: 139 m (456 ft)
- Population (2022): 28,170
  - Density: 2,369/km^{2} (6,136/sq mi)
- Postal code: 85000—85009
- Area code: +380-6277
- Climate: Dfb

Dobropillia (Ukrainian: Добропілля, IPA: [dobroˈpilʲːɐ]; Russian: Доброполье, romanized: Dobropol'ye) is a city in Pokrovsk Raion, Donetsk Oblast, Dobropillia urban hromada, Ukraine. Prior to 2020, it was a city of oblast significance and served as the center of the former Dobropillia Raion, though it was administratively separate from the raion. It is located 94 kilometres (58 mi) from Donetsk, the administrative capital of the oblast. In 2022, 28,000 people lived in Dobropillia, and in 2025, approximately 22,000 did. As of November 2026, the town was under heavy fighting in the Russo-Ukrainian war.

== Geography ==
Located in the northwestern part of the region, on the Byk River (a tributary of the Samara River (a tributary of the Dnieper River), part of the Dnieper River basin). Dobropillya Station is part of the Yasinovataya branch of the Donetsk Railways. The city is located 95 km west of Donetsk.

== History ==
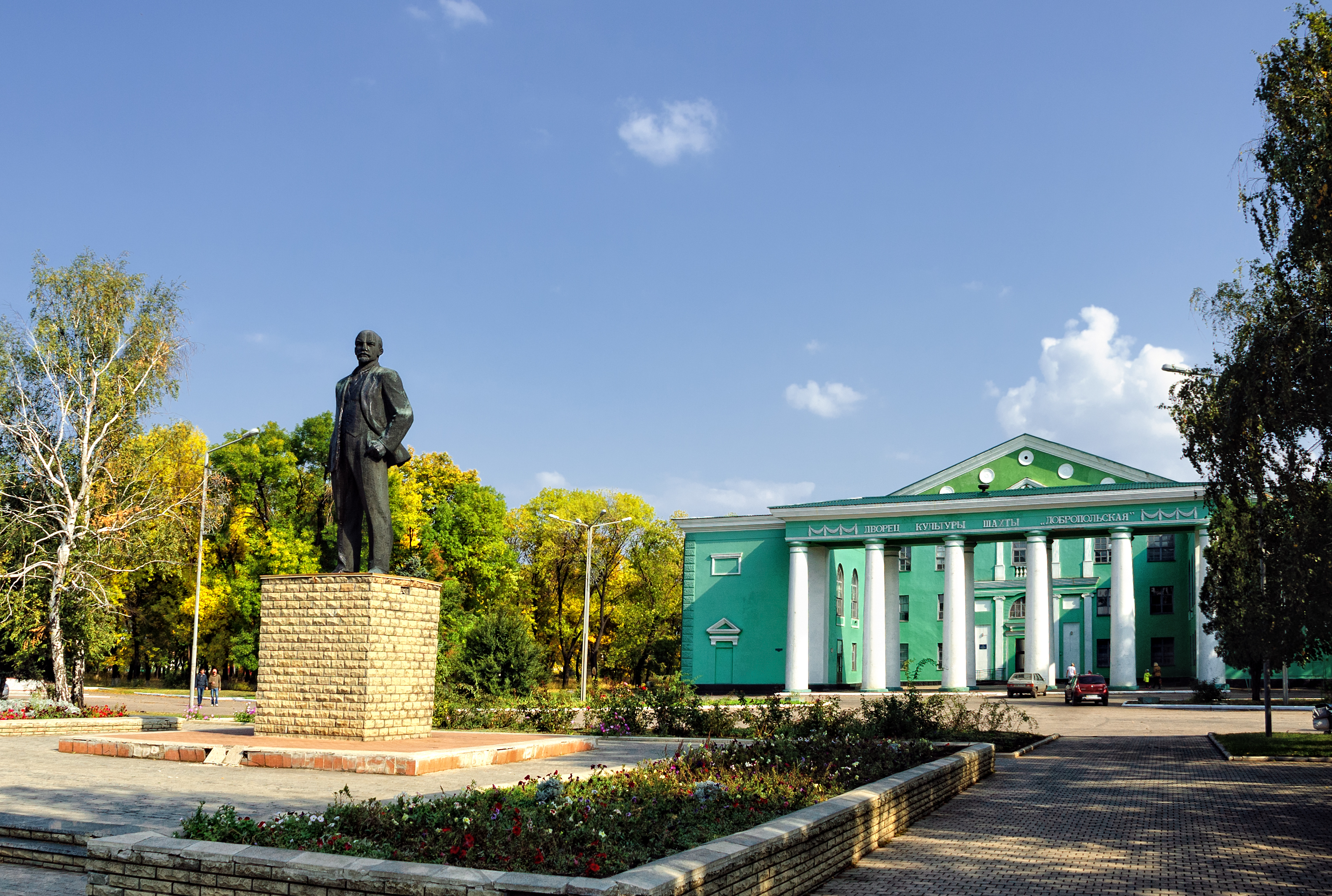
Monument to the V.I. Lenin on main square.

The city of Dobropillia was founded in the 1840s as the Praskoveyevka farmstead (44 residents in 1859) by the landowner Albansky. Coal deposits were discovered in the area in the 1870s and 1880s, and the first mine was founded by the landowner Yenin at the end of the century. In 1913, the Erastovsky mine was established, and on the right bank of the Byka River, the Svyatogorsky mine. Since 1914, a railway line has been in operation, designed to transport coal mined from the mines of the Dobropolsky district.

=== Soviet period ===
By 1920, Paraskoveyevka had 47 farms and 270 residents, with another 150 residents in the settlement of the Svyatogorsky mine. A small hospital and primary school were also in operation. In 1931, the powerful Maxim Gorky "Giant" mine (after the war, No. 1-2 "Dobropolyeugol") was commissioned, around which two well-appointed settlements appeared: Tekhnokolonna and Vremennaya Koloniya.

In 1935, all the settlements were merged into the village of Dobropolye. Pre-war coal production by the Dobropolyeugol trust was 291.5 thousand tons (1939), post-war - 401 thousand tons (1950). A local newspaper is published here since February 1935.

During the Second World War, the settlement was occupied by Axis troops. As of early 1951, there was a high school, two libraries and several coal mining enterprises operating here. The largest of which was the Dobropolskaya Central Coal Processing Plant, which was commissioned in 1950 and processed 1.2 million tons of coal. The settlement of Zhdanov grew around it.

In 1953, after merging with several settlements, it became a city. Under regional jurisdiction, the population grew to 18,000 due to resettlement from the Vinnytsia and Zhytomyr regions. In 1959, large coking coal deposits were discovered in the surrounding area. New mines and settlements were built there.

Since 1963, Dobropillya has been a city under Donetsk Oblast regional jurisdiction. In 1963, the city's population was 25,000. On August 23, 1968, trolleybus service opened in Dobropillya, making Dobropillya one of the smallest cities in the world with trolleybus service. In 1970, the population of the city was 30 thousand people, the basis of the economy was coal mining.

=== Independent Ukraine ===
Dobropillia was one of the first towns shelled by Russia using "Grad" MLRS on 13 June 2014, with one civilian killed.

On the night of 7 March 2025, during the Russian invasion of Ukraine, the Russian army attacked a residential district between Shevchenko and Luhanska streets with ballistic missiles. A double-tap attack with cluster munitions happened shortly after the first one with 11 killed and 30 wounded initially confirmed.

In July 2025, a Russian air strike on a shopping center in the town killed at least two people and injured several others. An FAB-type 500-kg bomb was used in the attack, affecting 54 retail outlets, 304 apartments, and eight vehicles. Dobropillia was about 15 kilometers from the front line at the time.

On 24 July 2025, the authorities of the Donetsk region decided to forcibly evacuate families with children. Beginning on 11 August 2025, Russia launched an offensive towards the city and the Dobropillia–Kramatorsk highway as part of the Russian invasion of Ukraine.

As of June 2026, due to the approaching frontline, about 1,000 people remained in Dobropillia. In July 2026, Russian forces started battle for the city. On October 16, 2026, Russian forces claimed full control of the city.

== Economy ==
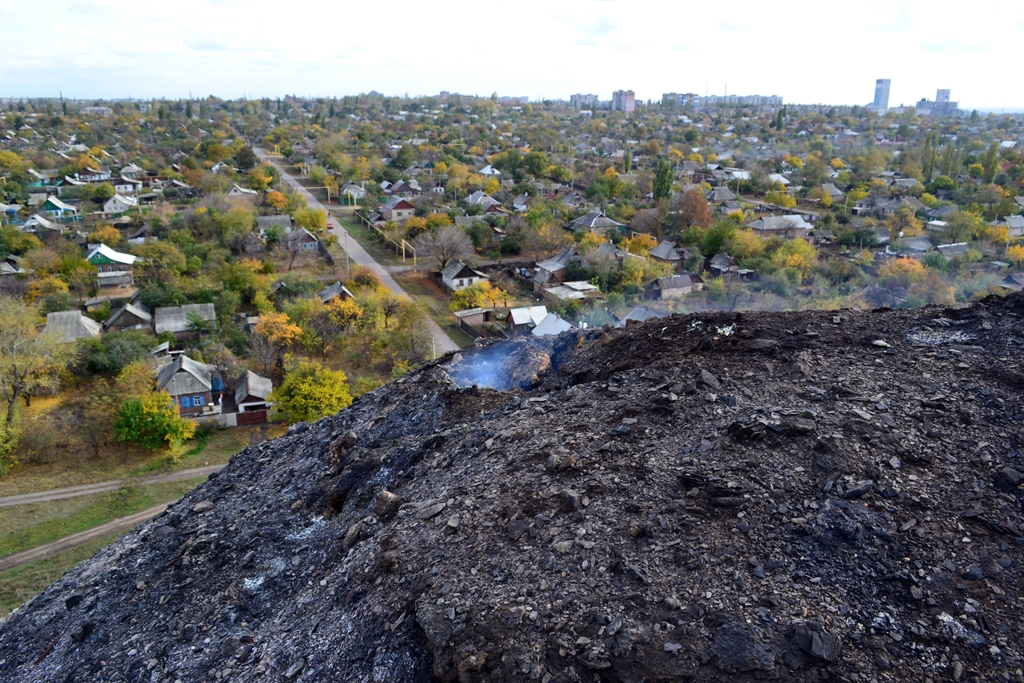
Terricon of the Dobropolyeugol mine.

Coal mining (the Dobropolyeugol Mining and Chemical Combine) is one of the largest enterprises in the industry — coal production in 2003 was 5,270 thousand tons. One of the best coal mining enterprises is the Dobropolska mine. Its team has been recognized with international prizes for production achievements and technical innovations.

Construction materials companies, the food industry (Zolotoy Kolodets, a grain processing plant), and a feed mill. More than 60% of those employed in the city economy work in the industry. The city still does not have a gas network. There are problems with the water supply.

In 2003, industrial production volume was 490 million hryvnia (7,063 hryvnias per capita). The industrial production index in 2003 was 81.8% of 1990 levels. Air emissions from city pollution sources in 2003 totaled 11.9 thousand tons.

In 1969, the Krasnoarmeyskaya and Novodonetskaya mines, along with the second central processing plant, were commissioned. In 1970, the Dobropolyeugol trust was liquidated, and the mines were transferred to the Krasnoarmeyskugol combine (located in Novoekonomicheskoe, now Mirnohrad). In 1976, the Dobropolyeugol trust was reestablished, comprising nine coal mines and two mine construction organizations.

As of the early 1980s, the city had the Dobropolyeugol production association (uniting nine coal mines), a processing plant, a reinforced concrete products and structures plant, a bakery, a grain processing plant, a dairy plant, an inter-collective farm construction organization, a poultry hatchery, a consumer services plant, 10 comprehensive schools, a music school, a hospital, a cultural center, a club, two movie theaters, and five libraries.

In May 1995, the Cabinet of Ministers of Ukraine approved the decision to privatize the motor transport enterprise. processing plant, mechanical repair plant and motor depot of the Dobropolyeugol trust, in July 1995 - the decision to privatize the reinforced concrete plant pipes in October 1995 - the decision to privatize the poultry hatchery station

At the beginning of 2011, the Donbass Fuel and Energy Company of Rinat Akhmetov signed a lease agreement with the State Property Fund of Ukraine for the state enterprise Dobropolyeugol (which accounted for approximately 6.1% of the production of energy coal in Ukraine) for 49 years.

As of 2013, the coal industry remained the backbone of Dobropillia's economy, accounting for 98.9% of all output by the city's enterprises.

== Transport ==
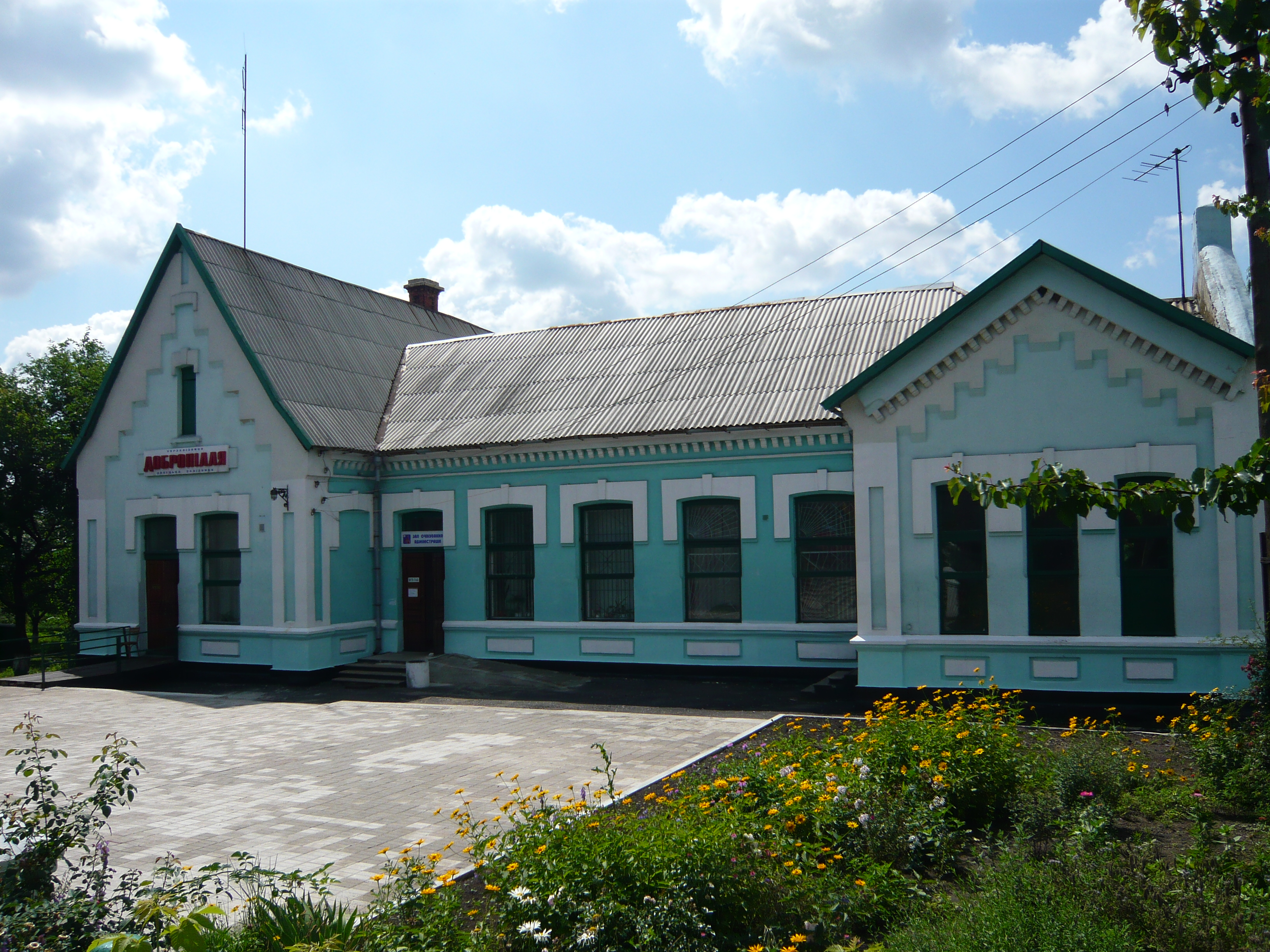
Railway station in the city.

From 1968 to 2010, Dobropillia was one of the smallest settlements in the world to have a trolleybus service. The city was listed in the Guinness Book of Records as the smallest city with a trolleybus depot. Trolleybus service was opened on August 23, 1968 and closed on March 15, 2011. Until the early 1990s, the trolleybus fleet consisted of 10 vehicles, with two routes in operation (Center — RKKA Shakhta and RMZ — 1-2 Dobropolskaya Shakhta).

In April 2009, the electric transport was transferred to municipal ownership of the city, and one trolleybus remained in service. Later, two Bogdan buses were transferred to the balance sheet of the newly created municipal enterprise "Dobropillia City Transport", but in 2011 the trolleybus service was closed.

== Social sphere ==
The city has 1 hospital, 7 health centers, 1 community center, 6 libraries, and 2 recreation parks.

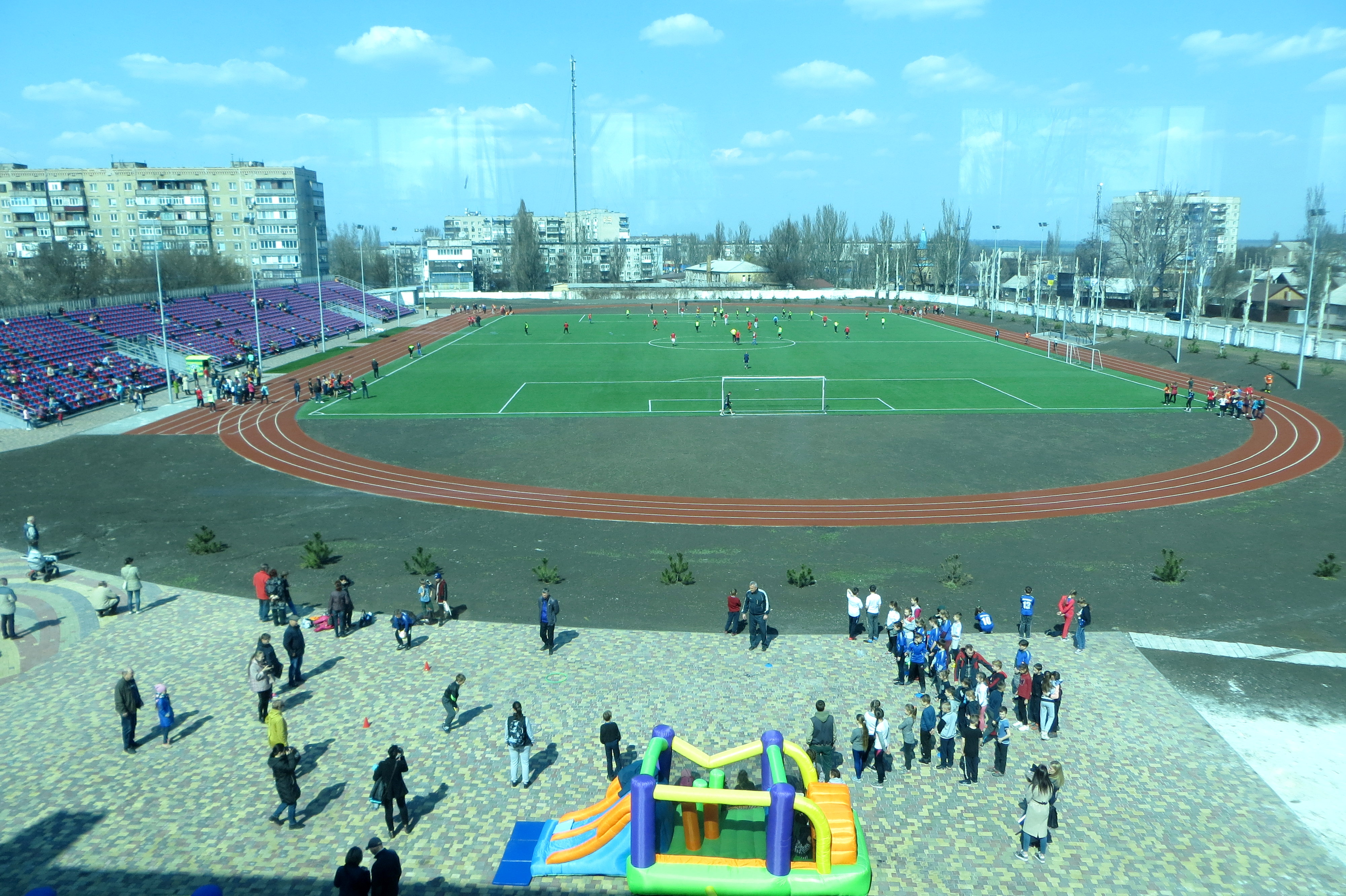
Avanhard Stadium

- Dobropillia Mine Culture Palace
- Sports Palace (Nezavisimosti Street)
- Swimming Pool (Nezavisimosti Street)
- Dobropillia City Centralized Library System
- Children's Library - Branch No. 5 of the Dobropillia City Centralized Library System
- Dobropillia Central District Hospital (Pobedy Avenue)
- Children's and Youth Creativity Center
- Arutyunov Sports Complex
- Avanhard Football Stadium
- Dobropillia Intensive Care Hospital, established in 2014.
- Dobropillia Primary Health Care Center, established in 2012.

=== Attractions ===
In the city of Dobropillia, there are 12 monuments of history and monumental art of local importance on the register.

Notable natural objects:

- Nikanorivsky Forest Reserve
- Hektova Balka Botanical Reserve

== Education ==
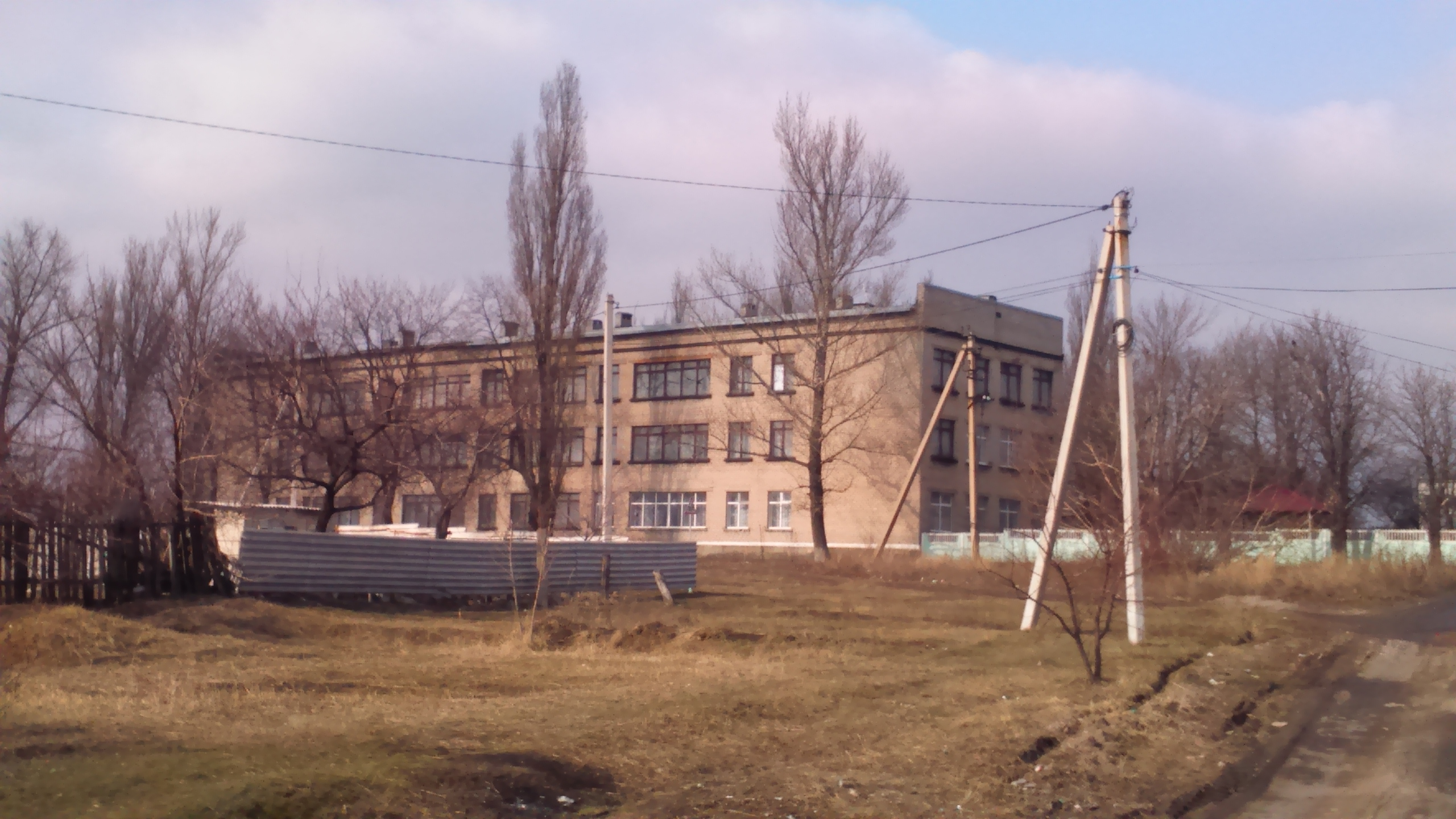
Secondary school No. 3.

Currently, following educational institutions operate in the city:

- Secondary School No. 1
- Secondary School No. 2
- Secondary School No. 3
- Secondary School No. 4
- Educational complex: secondary school of I-III levels—lyceum
- Secondary School No. 6
- Secondary School No. 7
- Municipal Institution of General Secondary Education of I-III Levels No. 2
- Comprehensive school of I-III grades No. 19
- Evening shift comprehensive school of II-III grades No. 2
- Children's Music School No. 1 (Saratovskaya Street)

In addition to these educational institutions in the city there are:

- DTEK Dobropolyavugol educational and training complex

== Demographics ==
Population

The population of the Dobropillia urban hromada as of July 2025, was 30,000 people, and the city itself is about 22,000 (before the war - 42,500 and 28,000 respectively).

Year	Inhabitants
1859	44
1897	100
1908	73
1923	811
1926	570
1939	5,901
1956	19,700
1959	23,666
1964	26,000
1970	30,115
1979	32,587
1989	40,064
1992	40,600
1994,	41,000
1998	37,700
2002	35,638
2003	34,893
2004	34,420
2005	33,896
2006	33,375
2007	32,921
2008	32,475
2009	32,160
2010	31,934
2011	31,701
2012	31,514
2013	31,196
2014	30,884
2015	30,697
2016	30,455
2017	30,186
2018	29,682
2019	29,384
2020	29,129
2021	28,757

As of the Ukrainian Census of 2001:

Ethnicity

- Ukrainians: 71.3%
- Russians: 25.9%
- Belarusians: 1.1%
- Tatars: 0.4%
- Greeks: 0.2%

Language

- Russian: 61.0%
- Ukrainian: 38.5%
- Belarusian: 0.1%

== Religion ==
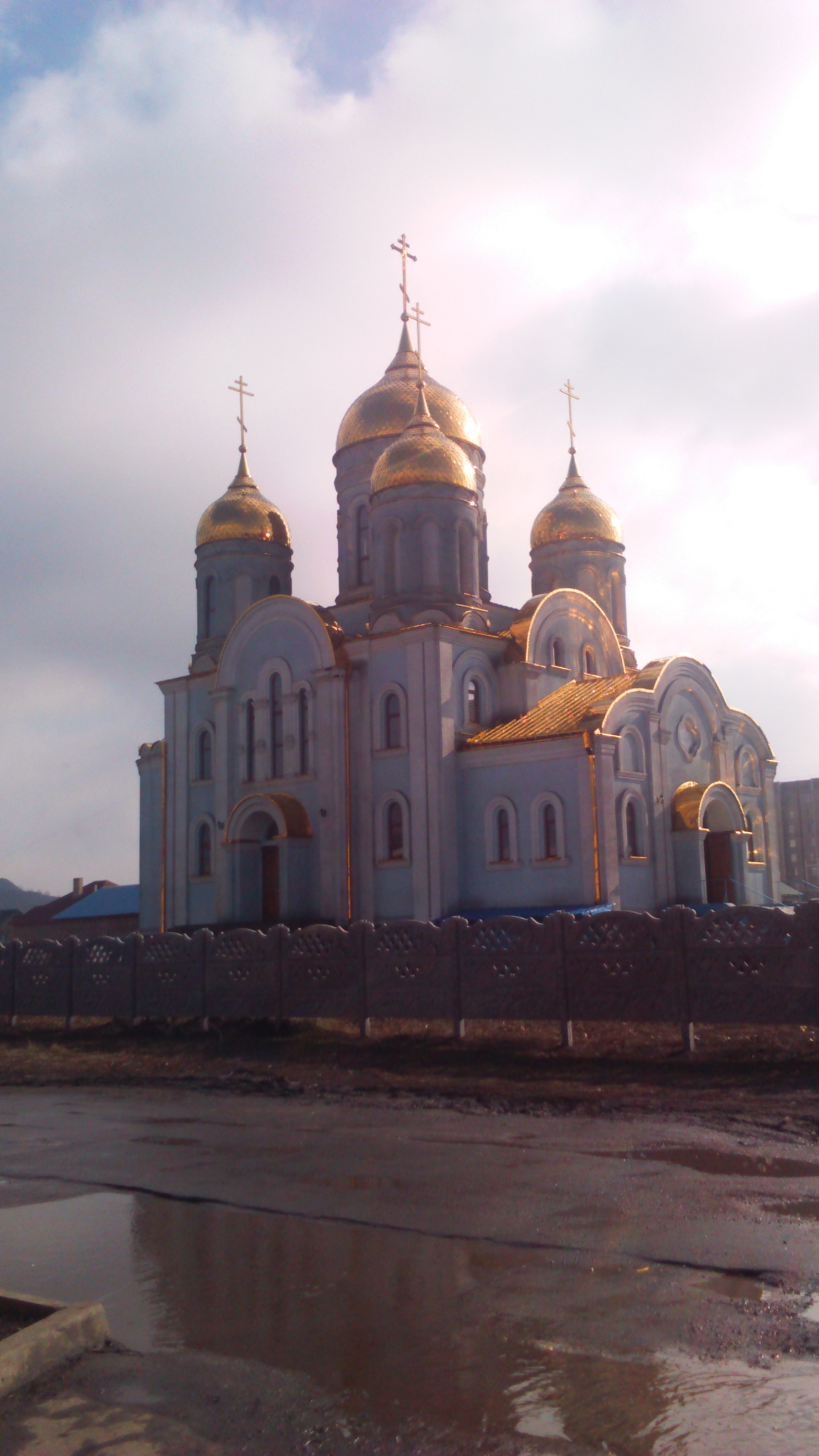
Pokrovsk Church.

There are 20 religious organizations in Greater Dobropolly, including: parishes of the ROC (UOC MP) — 7 of the Gorlovka Eparchy of the Russian Orthodox Church (Ukrainian Orthodox Church of the Moscow Patriarchate), 2 parishes of the Donetsk Eparchy of the Orthodox Church of Ukraine, 1 parish of the Ukrainian Greek Catholic Church.

There are 4 churches in the city of Dobropillya Russian Orthodox Church (UOC-MP):

- Pokrovsky Church
- Ambrose Church
- Church of the Icon of the Mother of God "Joy of All Who Sorrow"
- Trinity Church

Orthodox Church of Ukraine:

- St. Nicholas Parish

== Notable people ==
- Art Bezrukavenko (born 1996), content creator and social media personality
