= Volodymyr Moroz =

Ukrainian businessman and politician (1967–2025)

- Володимир Мороз
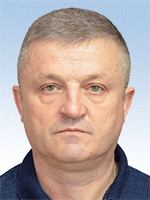
- Official portrait, 2019

People's Deputy of Ukraine
- In office 29 August 2019 – 21 April 2025
- Preceded by: Serhii Sazhko
- Constituency: Donetsk Oblast, No. 59

Personal details
- Born: 24 October 1967 Kurakhove, Marinka Raion, Donetsk Oblast, Ukrainian SSR, USSR (now Ukraine)
- Died: 21 April 2025 (aged 57)
- Party: Restoration of Ukraine (from 2022)
- Other political affiliations: OPZZh (2019–2022); PPB (2014–2019)
- Education: Kharkiv National University of Construction and Architecture; Hryhorii Skovoroda University in Pereiaslav

Volodymyr Viktorovych Moroz (Ukrainian: Володимир Вікторович Мороз; 24 October 1967 – 21 April 2025) was a Ukrainian businessman and politician who served as a People's Deputy of Ukraine from Ukraine's 59th electoral district from 29 August 2019 until his death. Elected as member of Opposition Platform — For Life, he later become a member of Restoration of Ukraine from 2022.

== Background ==
Volodymyr Viktorovych Moroz was born on 24 October 1967 in the city of Kurakhove in the Donetsk Oblast of what was then the Soviet Union. From 1988 to 1992, he worked at Kurakhove Power Station before working as a welder at the "Ecology" company in Kurakhove. In 1997, he became deputy supply director at the Kurakhove-based company DonAhroServis ATZT, and in 2000 he moved to KurakhovEnerhoBud BMU, where he served as deputy director. Moroz left KurakhovEnerhoBud in 2005 to work at PromEnerhoBud TOV, where he also served as deputy director.

In 1996, Moroz graduated from the Kharkiv National University of Construction and Architecture with a specialisation in "heating gas supply, and air pool protection". He also graduated from the Hryhorii Skovoroda University in Pereiaslav in 2005, specialising in economic entrepreneurship.

Moroz died on 21 April 2025, at the age of 57.

== Political career ==
From 2010 to 2014, Moroz was deputy head of the Kurakhove City Council for housing and communal arrangements and city improvement. From 2014 to 2019, he was head of the Marinka Raion administration. At the same time, he was head of the Petro Poroshenko Bloc in Marinka Raion.

Moroz ran in the 2019 Ukrainian parliamentary election as the candidate of Opposition Platform — For Life (OPZZh) for People's Deputy of Ukraine from Ukraine's 59th electoral district. He was successfully elected, defeating incumbent People's Deputy Serhii Sazhko with 31.16% of the vote to Sazhko's 21.48%.

=== People's Deputy of Ukraine ===
In the Verkhovna Rada (Ukraine's parliament), Moroz joined the faction of OPZZh, as well as the Verkhovna Rada Committee on Housing and Communal Service and the Verkhovna Rada Energy Committee.

In August 2020, Moroz was one of 47 People's Deputies to bring the matter of electronic income declarations to the Constitutional Court of Ukraine. As a result of the efforts of Moroz and the other deputies, the Constitutional Court chose to abolish electronic income declarations.

In 2022, following the beginning of the Russian invasion of Ukraine and the banning of pro-Russian parties by the government of Ukraine, Moroz joined the Restoration of Ukraine party, made up of former members of OPZZh. The same year, he was among the proponents of a law to prevent local-level lawmakers from being deprived of their mandates due to membership in the OPZZh or other pro-Russian parties.
