= Shakhove =

Village in Donetsk Oblast, Ukraine

Shakhove Шахове
- Village
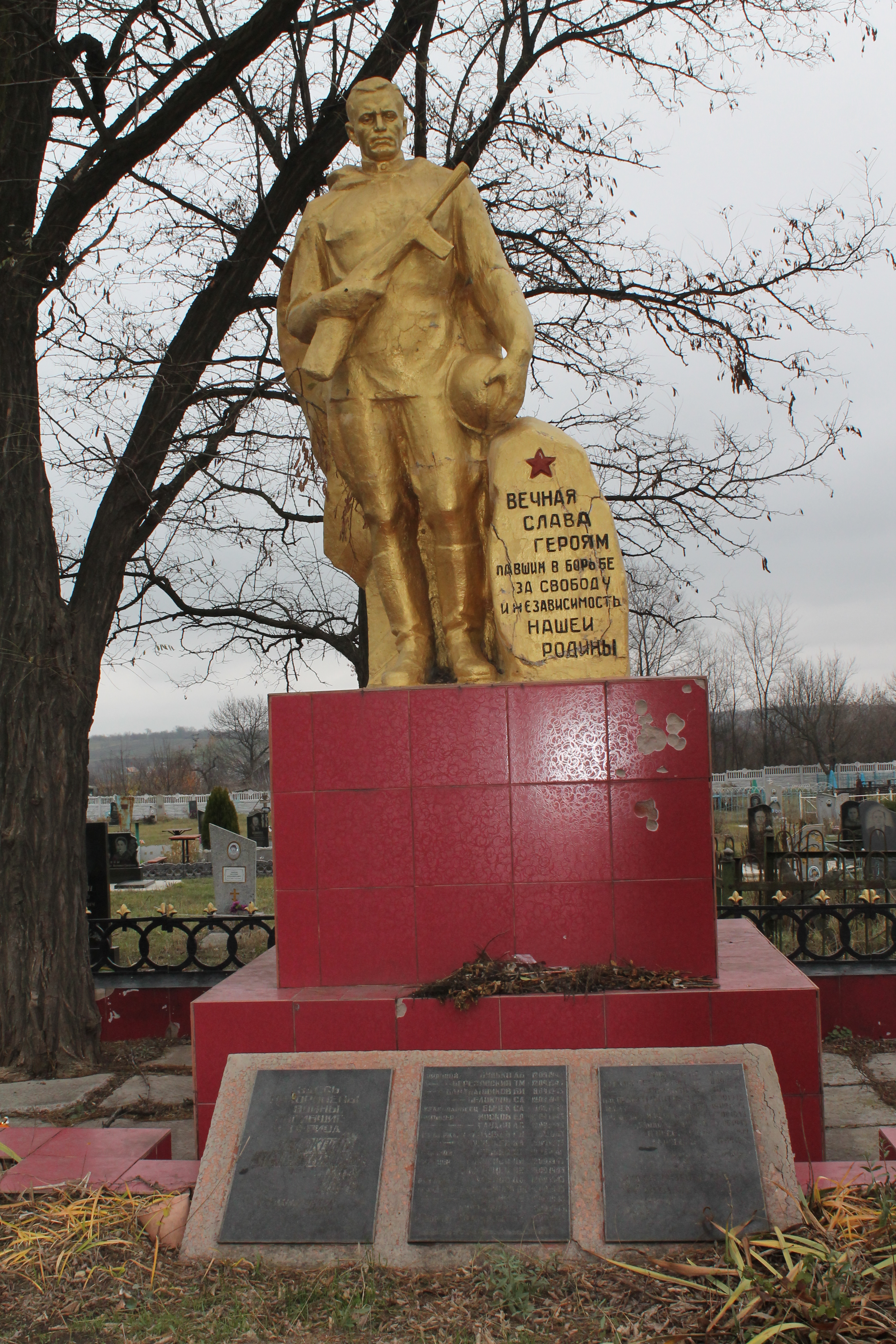
- The mass graves of Soviet soldiers and the head of the volost in Shakhove
- Interactive map of Shakhove
- Location of Shakhove Shakhove (Donetsk Oblast)
- Coordinates: 48°27′53″N 37°20′57″E
- Country: Ukraine
- Oblast: Donetsk Oblast
- Raion: Pokrovsk Raion
- Hromada: Shakhove rural hromada

Population (2025)
  - Total: 72
- Time zone: UTC+2 (EET)
  - Summer (DST): UTC+3 (EEST)
- Postal code: 85050
- Area code: +380 6277

Shakhove (Note: See §Name for former and native names) is a village in the Pokrovsk Raion of Donetsk Oblast, Ukraine. It serves as the administrative center of the Shakhove rural hromada. Its population was about 900 (2001 estimate). As residents have fled during Russia's Pokrovsk offensive, the population was estimated to be around 72 people in October 2025, shortly before the village's capture by Russian forces.

The village was founded following the Russo-Turkish War of 1768-1774 by Oleksiy Hryhorovych Shakhov, who was a captain in the Imperial Russian Army, and named the settlement originally after his first name. After the establishment of multiple factories in the village and its renaming, it was made the center of the Kazennoye-Torskoye-Alekseyevskoye volost in Bakhmut uezd. In 1912, just before the outbreak of World War One, the village reached its peak population of 1,185 people. After the fall of Imperial Russia and its takeover by the Soviet Union, it was renamed to Oktyabrskoye. In the subsequent decades, a new collective farm was opened entitled "Rossiia", and new buildings were built. Following the collapse of the Soviet Union, the village became part of Ukraine, which in 2016 renamed it to Shakhove. Shakhove was the popular name used by peasants that came from the last name of the founder of the village.

Since the start of the Russian invasion of Ukraine in February 2022, the village became the site of significant fighting due its proximity to both Dobropillia and Pokrovsk during the Pokrovsk offensive. Following months of fighting, the village was captured by Russian forces sometime in late November to early December 2025. Russia calls Shakhove by its pre-2016 name Oktyabrskoye (Note: According to Russian transliteration) and considers it to be part of the Donetsk People's Republic, which it claims to have annexed.

== Name ==
=== Current names ===
- Ukrainian: Шахове
- Russian: Шахово

=== Former names ===
- Oktyabrskoye (Ukrainian: Октябрське; Russian: Октябрьское); 1919–2016
- Kazennoye-Torskoye-Alekseyevskoye (Russian: Казённо-Торско-Алексеевское; Ukrainian: Казенно-Торсько-Олексіївське); c. early 1800s-1919. Also variously referred to in documents as Torsko-Oleksiyivka, Kazennotorske, and Shakhova.
- Oleksiyivka c. 1770s-c. early 1800s

=== Name history ===
The original name of the village was Oleksiyivka when the village was established following the Russo-Turkish War, after the founder's first name, Oleksiy Hryhorovych Shakhov. It went by this name until the name was changed in the early 1800s in order to avoid confusion with a village of the same name near the modern-day city of Bakhmut, as it caused administrative and postal confusion. The official name from then on in the Russian Empire was Kazennoye-Torskoe-Oleksiyevskoye. The name chosen was a compound: it combines the river on which the village sat (Kazennyi Torets) with the river name Torets and finally the original name of the village Oleksiyevskoye (which is also referred to as Oleksiyivka). It was also variously known under shortened official variants like Torsko-Oleksiyivka, Kazennotorske, and the folk name Shakhova that was used by the peasants of the village. The name of the village stayed this way until the October Revolution, when the empire fell and it was replaced by the Soviet Union, which changed the name from Kazennoye-Torskoe-Oleksiyevskoye to Oktyabrskoye, which means "of October".

The Soviet name of the village would stay for nearly a century until 2016. Following 2014, the Decommunization in Ukraine would take effect. In May 2015, President Petro Poroshenko approved the renaming of all public places that were named after Soviet communists, with the municipal governments having the first choice unless they decided not to rename it, in which case the Cabinet of Ministers of Ukraine would do so. Per this law, in 2016 the village was renamed back to Shakhove, which was the name used in folk usage since at least when the village was founded. Shakhove was derived from the surname of the founding landlord family, Oleksiy Hryhorovych Shakhov, who founded the village, and the village continued to be ruled by the Shakhov family up until 1868.

Russia calls Shakhove by its pre-2016 name Oktyabrskoye in official documents, as it claims to have annexed the village.

== History ==
=== Early history ===
Historical affiliations

Russian Empire c.1770s–1917
Ukrainian People's Republic 1917–1918
∟ autonomous part of the Russian Republic
Ukrainian State 1918
Ukrainian People's Republic 1918–1920
Ukrainian Soviet Socialist Republic 1920–1941
∟ part of the Soviet Union from 1922
Reichskommissariat Ukraine 1941–1943
∟ part of German-occupied Europe
Ukrainian Soviet Socialist Republic 1943–1991
∟ part of the Soviet Union
Ukraine 1991–present

In 2014, archaeologists associated with the Donetsk Regional Museum of Local History and led by Eduard Kravchenko found a kurgan 10–12 km from the village that was half a meter high but 35–40 meters wide. The kurgan contained a double burial site that was dated to the Late Bronze Age, and, according to the researchers, was the work of the Srubnaya culture and was probably 3,500 to 3,600 years old. They also found a vessel that was decorated with red ochre, which was unusual for the culture, alongside a vessel that had sacred symbols including swastikas from the Indo-Aryans. Next to the site was also a pagan temple, suggesting that the site was likely a burial place for nobility.

There were previously, as described in a map dated to 1749, Cossack tunnels under the site of the modern-day village around the southern outskirts. Most of the tunnels have since collapsed, with only two small passages being preserved.

=== Imperial village ===
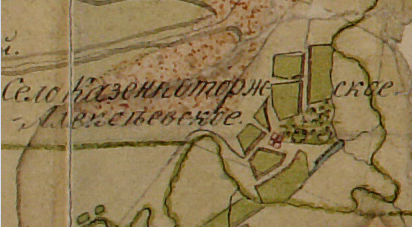
The village on a map from the 1790s. In the map it is referred to as "Kazennoye-Torskoye-Alekseyevskoye", referring to the village in Russian.

The first semblance of the village was recorded in a 1749 map by a Russian surveyor named Bybikov, who was recording Sloboda Ukraine. In the map, there is a fortress at the site of the Shakhove, which in the document is described as the fortress at the summit of the river Kazennyi Torets, so it was in military use. The actual founding of the village dates back to when Oleksiy Hryhorovych Shakhov, who was a sub-lieutenant and later captain in the Imperial Russian Army and a member of the Kursk nobility, received 5,200 desiatins of land after the Russo-Turkish War of 1768–1774. He named the land as the village of Oleksiyivka (also Oleksiivka), where he and his serfs, whom he brought with him, lived.

By 1795, the village's first church was established, the Church of the Life-Giving Trinity. Prior to this, since the village was not large enough, residents went to nearby Raiske for the church there, which had been founded shortly before in 1781. Shortly after the founding of the church, in 1795, it is known that there was an uprising in the village by the peasants against Shakhov due to exploitation, but that the uprising was suppressed brutally. By the early 1800s, the village was passed down to Luka Oleksiiovych Shakhov, a relative of the original owner. During this time, the village was renamed from Oleksiyivka to Kazennoye-Torskoye-Alekseyevskoye. This was done in order to prevent confusion with another village of the same name, as post offices and other establishments became confused between the two.

It was also during the time of Luka being the owner that the village encountered severe financial difficulties because he often gambled, which led to large amounts of debt and him having to mortgage the village in 1863. After his death, the estate of the village passed on to his widow, who sold large parts of the land to cover the debt, and so the village only had 1,913 desiatins by this time. However, the village was able to recover as the industry improved. By 1859, there were three factories in the village, with one presumably being for the production of bricks. In 1874, a postal station started to operate on the territory of the village, and a few years later in 1880 a new wax factory was opened under the merchant Ivan Dmitrievich Stepanov. By 1887, it was producing 200 puds of candles annually worth 4,000 rubles, and a decade later it was listed under the directory of "Ukazatel fabrik i zavodov Evropeyskoy Rossii" as employing 10 people.

As the village grew larger, it was named as the center of the Kazennoye-Torskoye-Alekseyevskoye volost of the Bakhmut uezd. In 1874, the village school first appeared in the directory of public schools for Yekaterinoslav Governorate. Industrial additions in the village continued to grow after this. A limestone quarry became active in the village, and the raw materials from the quarry were transported to what is now the city of Kramatorsk and to other factories in the Donbas. There was also a steam mill in the village, first mentioned in 1823, but it was destroyed by fire a century later. In November 1897, a new bridge was also commissioned to cross Kazennyi Torets in order to connect the village of Heevka (or Heiivka), and was 25 fathoms or 53.25 meters long and cost the zemstvo 8,626 rubles and 81 kopecks. In order to bring law enforcement into the village, a police bailiff was also established during the late 1800s.

In 1903, two new buildings were established in the village. The first was a brick school building to replace the previous school that was held in a cottage, and the other was a hospital complex. A few years later, after the bridge that connected the village to Heiivka was destroyed by flooding, in 1909 a new reinforced concrete one was constructed due to the need to reach the city of Druzhkivka, which was only possible via the bridge. By the date 1912, just before World War One broke out, it was recorded that in the village there were two factories, both belonging to the merchant Ivan Dmitrievich Stepanov, which were a wax-bleaching plant and a candle factory.

=== The Soviet era ===
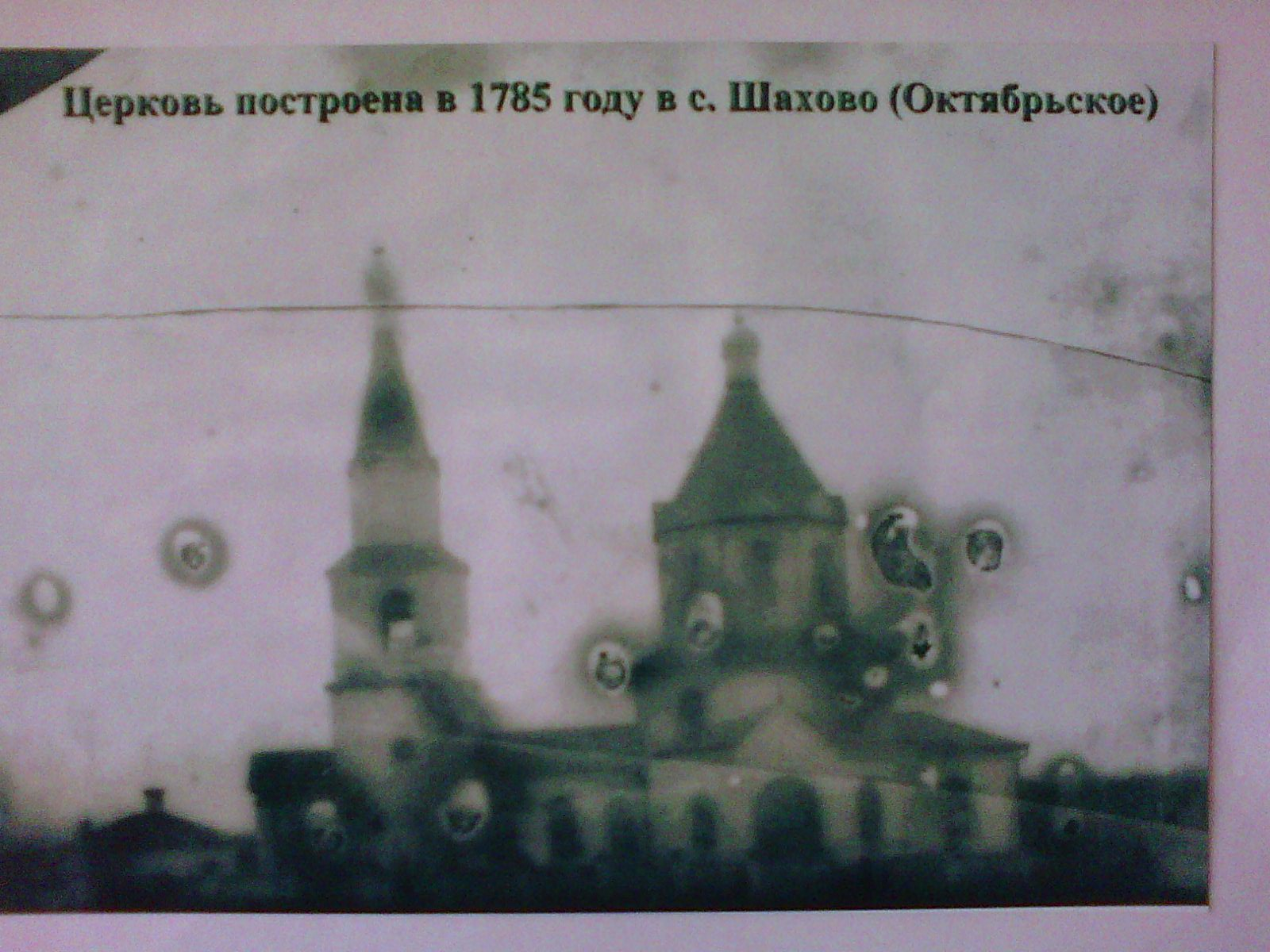
A church in the village (destroyed c. 1930s).

After the fall of the Russian Empire, the Soviet Union captured and annexed the village during the Russian Civil War into the Ukrainian SSR. The village came under Soviet control with the help of K. M. Yurchenko, P. I. Trembo, and M. P. Denisenko, who were workers from Druzhkivka, but they were later killed by the White Army. In 1919, the village was renamed by the Soviet authorities from its Imperial-era name to Oktyabrskoye, meaning "of October". After the start of World War Two, 380 villagers went to serve in the Soviet Army, of whom 162 died. Notable local veterans were Hryhorii Proshchaiev, who was awarded the title of the Hero of the Soviet Union and served with the 235th Assault Aviation Regiment, and Tymofii Ryabokon, who was awarded the Order of the Red Star for killing five soldiers and destroying a German tank at Korsun-Shevchenkivskyi. The village was occupied from the time of Operation Barbarossa until 1943 as part of Reichskommissariat Ukraine by Nazi Germany, when it was then liberated.

In the postwar years, the school reopened under the direction of Olha Kravchenko, and the enrollment peaked at 380 children. In 1947, four teachers were awarded the Order "For Valiant Labor", and a collective farm was opened under the name "Rossiia" that developed cattle, sheep, and pigs. "Rossiia" was recorded as having 3,000 hectares of arable land. In the 1970s, new buildings were also opened up in the village. A new kindergarten named "Topolka" was opened, alongside a House of Culture and a new administrative building for the board of the collective farm and the village council. The new Oktyabrskoye Secondary School was also opened. It was also recorded in "Istoriia mist i sil Ukrainskoi RSR" that the village had a club, a library, a radio station, and a children's center in addition to this.

=== Independent Ukraine ===
On 14 August 2015, by Order No. 390-395, the village was transferred to the new Shakhove rural hromada as part of the creation of amalgamated hromadas, which it was appointed as the administrative center of. The hromada, previous to Shakhove's renaming in 2016, was known as the Oktyabrske rural hromada. Previous to it being part of this hromada, it was part of the Oktiabrska silska rada.

In 2016, in accordance with the law on the renaming of all place names named after Soviet communists that was approved by the Verkhovna Rada and signed by Petro Poroshenko, the village was renamed from Oktyabrskoye to its present name of Shakhove. Shakhove was the surname of the founding landlord family of the village, and was a folk name in use since at least the time of Imperial Russia in addition to its official name.

Until 18 July 2020, the village was part of the Dobropillia Raion, with the administrative center being the city of Dobropillia. The raion was abolished on 18 July 2020 as part of administrative reform in Ukraine, which reduced the number of raions in Donetsk Oblast. The village was then transferred into the Pokrovsk Raion, which has its administrative center in the city of Pokrovsk.

==== War in the Donbas ====
Shakhove was affected by the outbreak of the War in the Donbas, when pro-Russian separatists began an uprising against the Ukrainian government and seized territory that they declared was part of the widely unrecognised Donetsk People's Republic. On 21 June 2014, a group of pro-Russian armed militia men attacked a group of Ukrainian forces near the village, killing one soldier and wounding another. This was disputed by Pavel Gubarev, who was one of the self-described leaders of the Donetsk People's Republic at the time associated with Igor Girkin, who stated three soldiers were killed in the attack and fifteen were wounded. The Prosecutor's Office of the Southern Region announced soon after that they would classify the incident as a terrorist act under the Criminal Code of Ukraine. Months later, on 30 October 2014, the Cabinet of Ministers of Ukraine designated, through Order No. 1053, that the village lay within the Anti-Terrorist Operation zone.

==== Russian invasion of Ukraine ====
===== Battle for Shakhove =====
====== Strategic significance ======
In an August 2025 report, during heavy fighting for the village, it was noted in an analysis that the village was important during the Pokrovsk offensive as Ukrainian troops needed it to direct drones and artillery at Russian reinforcements and columns that were attempting to enter the area to capture nearby Dobropillia. By capturing Dobropillia, Russian forces could eventually help the supply line in the north to starve out Ukrainian troops in Pokrovsk. The village also, at the time, was noted for having been a potential base for any Ukrainian counterattacks against the forces. Russian milbloggers also noted this, stating that any attempts to capture Dobropillia would remain at a stalemate until Shakhove was captured, in which case Russian forces could establish supply lines and help expand the front.

====== Evacuation and early fighting ======
On 24 February 2022, Russia started the Russian invasion of Ukraine after announcing a "special military operation" in order to support the breakaway Donetsk People's Republic and Luhansk People's Republic. On 23 September 2024, it was reported on about some of the first shelling of the city by the Russian Armed Forces. It was reported that seven people were injured, and many buildings in the village were damaged, including administrative ones. As the frontline grew closer to the village, on 29 April 2025, some of the first casualties in the village happened when two KAB-250 bombs accompanied by two drones that were operated by the Russians killed a civilian and wounded another. It was confirmed a few days later on 3 May 2025 by the Governor of Donetsk Oblast, Vadym Filashkin, that the start of forced evacuation of children would begin from Shakhove, and he also urged the general civilian population to evacuate as well.

By August 2025, Russian forces began to make attempts to capture the settlement as part of the Dobropillia offensive, as the village was needed to reach the Dobropillia-Kramatorsk road that could cut off the supply line to Pokrovsk. The attempts to do so were pushed back by the defending 1st Azov Corps. In a similar early attempt on the village, on 11 September, Russian forces attempted to capture the village alongside other nearby ones in the hromada, but were again pushed back by Ukrainian forces.

====== Mechanized assault phase (October–November 2025) ======
After a stalemate had persisted for the village, on 10 October 2025, fighting for the village resumed with a series of large Russian mechanized assaults, instead of the use of infantry. The first attempt to do so by Russian forces on 10 October used approximately 35 armored vehicles, but they were forced to retreat. Over the following days after the initial assault, Russian forces ramped up their attempts at assaults using vehicles. On 13 October, the second assault happened, with Russian forces using 16 armored vehicles, including infantry fighting vehicles (IFV), MT-LBs, and tanks. Russian forces initially attempted to break through with the use of motorcyclists, followed by the armored vehicles which carried infantry, and then they attempted to suppress Ukrainian drones using electronic warfare systems. The assault was halted in part due to pre-mined territory at the village, alongside the use of artillery, personnel, and unmanned systems. In total, the Ukrainian forces destroyed 9 infantry fighting vehicles, 4 armored personnel carriers, 3 three, 3 motorcycles, and, in addition 78 Russian soldiers were killed during the attempt.

A third assault followed three days later. The day prior, Russian forces had attempted to move and conceal their vehicles using a tree line at the village, but they were detected and two were destroyed. On the morning of 16 October, Russian forces attacked the village with 22 vehicles, with the largest column consisting of 11 tanks and IFVs coming from the direction of Malynivka (Hrodivka settlement hromada). The assault was repelled, with nine armored vehicles being destroyed and four damaged. After a week of idleness, Russian forces again assaulted the village, specifically during a time of foggy and wet conditions, in order to hamper drone visibility. This was the largest autumn mechanized assault to date, with 29 armored vehicles attacking Shakhove and nearby Volodymyrivka, with the vehicles advancing in small groups from different directions. The assault lasted six hours and was repelled by the 1st Azov Corps, 33rd Mechanized Brigade, and the 93rd Mechanized Brigade.

====== Street fighting (November 2025) ======
By late October, Russian milbloggers claimed that Russian forces had advanced into northern Shakhove. A few days later, on 2 November, Ukrainian forces advanced west of the village while intense fighting within the village continued. At the time, Russian units that were deployed within the village were said to be the 33rd Motor Rifle Regiment alongside the 1st Separate Guards Motor Rifle Brigade attached to the 51st Guards Combined Arms Army. Between 4 and 5 November 2025, Ukrainian forces advanced northeast and southeast of Shakhove and retook parts of eastern Shakhove in areas that were previously claimed by Russian troops. The 68th Guards Zhytomyr-Berlin Tank Regiment of the 150th Guards Motor Rifle Division provided Russian support to strike all Ukrainian positions within Shakhove. At the end of 5 November, it was reported by the General Staff of the Ukrainian Armed Forces that Ukrainian forces were repelling Russian assaults into Shakhove, while Russian forces were advancing into Volodymyrivka.

By 10 November, Russian forces had advanced into capturing back eastern Shakhove using the 163rd Guards Nizhyn Tank Regiment of the 150th Motorized Rifle Division. On 14 November 2025, just two days later, Russian milbloggers claimed that Russian forces had fully recaptured Shakhove. This claim was contradicted by geolocated footage that showed Russian forces were still striking Ukrainian positions within the village, as Ukrainian forces still maintained a foothold in some areas. Fighting still continued throughout the remainder of November. On 17 November, it was reported that Ukrainians had stopped 75 joint Russian assaults in the Pokrovsk offensive direction, including near Shakhove. Two days later, on 19 November, Russian milbloggers claimed Russian forces had recently advanced into the central part of Shakhove. By 23 November, the 336th Separate Guards Naval Infantry Brigade of the Russian army had arrived to help the Russian assault, and they advanced into southern Shakhove. At the time, the Ukrainians were trying to counterattack to claim back northern Shakhove, which the Russians had held since late October. On 28 November, it was reported by Russian news outlets that the village had been captured by Russian forces, but this was not verified.

====== Russian capture (December 2025-January 2026) ======
On 25 December 2025, Mashovets reported that Russian forces had seized Shakhove at a prior date, the first sourced claim of full Russian control of the village. The exact date could not be assessed. This was later confirmed on 12 January 2026, when DeepState reported on their maps that the Russians had advanced into capturing Shakhove.

It was also reported near the time of capture that Russian forces had executed two unarmed Ukrainian prisoners of war in Shakhove during an assault on the village when it still remained in contention. According to the Prosecutor General's Office of Ukraine, Russian forces had threatened both with firearms, forced one of them to partially undress, and then killed both of them and then removed the clothing from the other dressed soldier. The Donetsk Regional Prosecutor's Office announced they had opened a pretrial investigation under Article 438.2 of the Criminal Code of Ukraine for alleged war crimes. The Verkhovna Rada Commissioner for Human Rights, Dmytro Lubinets, later responded, saying that the conduct shown by Russian forces was systematic.

== Government and politics ==
=== Government ===
The village is administered as part of the Shakhivska rural hromada, with Shakhove as its administrative center. Prior to this, it was part of the Oktyabrskoye silska rada. As part of the administrative reform that was put in place in July 2020, the hromada has been part of the consolidated Pokrovsk Raion. Previously, it was part of the Dobropillia Raion. Following the Russian invasion of Ukraine, the village became part of a newly established military administration established on 4 July 2022. Serhii Sazhko, a former People's Deputy of Ukraine and Mayor of Kurakhove, was appointed as Head of the Shakhivska Military Administration that day.

=== Politics ===
The first elected head of the rural hromada, who is also the head of all the villages within it, was Volodymyr Kucherinenko. He was elected for the 8th convocation, which took place on 25 October 2015. The second head of the hromada, Valentyna Kindrativna Sereda, was also elected during the 8th convocation on 25 October 2020. On 25 November 2020, it was approved by the village council that the community would be divided into Starosta okruh, which is a subdivision of a hromada that is designed to represent the local interests of a settlement or group of settlements. Sereda was part of the pro-Russian and Eurosceptic political party Opposition Platform - For Life.

== Geography ==
=== Climate ===
Under the Köppen–Geiger climate classification system, Shakhove has a humid continental climate (Dfa).

During the summer months, Shakhovke is warm to hot, with an average temperature in June being 20 °C (68 °F) and July being 23 °C (73 °F). The record high recorded in the village is around 40 °C (104 °F), which was recorded in August. The coldest months are during the wintertime in January and February, when the average temperature is around −6 °C (21 °F) in January and −4 °C (25 °F) in February. The record low recorded in the village is around −37 °C (−35 °F), which was recorded in February. The wettest month by average precipitation is June, which has an average of 62mm of precipitation, with August being the driest at around 34mm of precipitation. The annual precipitation averages to be around 538mm per year.

Climate data for Shakhove (1991–2024)
| Month | Jan | Feb | Mar | Apr | May | Jun | Jul | Aug | Sep | Oct | Nov | Dec | Year |
|---|---|---|---|---|---|---|---|---|---|---|---|---|---|
| Record high °C (°F) | 10.38 (50.68) | 15.55 (59.99) | 21.54 (70.77) | 29.31 (84.76) | 35.35 (95.63) | 37.24 (99.03) | 39.77 (103.59) | 39.96 (103.93) | 36.47 (97.65) | 31.47 (88.65) | 21.12 (70.02) | 12.99 (55.38) | 39.96 (103.93) |
| Daily mean °C (°F) | −5.75 (21.65) | −4.40 (24.08) | 1.12 (34.02) | 8.93 (48.07) | 15.19 (59.34) | 20.40 (68.72) | 23.44 (74.19) | 22.92 (73.26) | 16.20 (61.16) | 8.65 (47.57) | 1.43 (34.57) | −3.46 (25.77) | 8.79 (47.82) |
| Record low °C (°F) | −35.01 (−31.02) | −36.72 (−34.10) | −20.93 (−5.67) | −6.51 (20.28) | −2.72 (27.10) | 3.24 (37.83) | 7.82 (46.08) | 7.55 (45.59) | −4.31 (24.24) | −6.91 (19.56) | −21.12 (−6.02) | −35.30 (−31.54) | −36.72 (−34.10) |
| Average precipitation mm (inches) | 44.6 (1.76) | 38.4 (1.51) | 41.5 (1.63) | 42.6 (1.68) | 53.3 (2.10) | 62.1 (2.44) | 48.4 (1.91) | 34.4 (1.35) | 41.1 (1.62) | 41.5 (1.63) | 42.9 (1.69) | 47.4 (1.87) | 538.2 (21.19) |
Source: NASA Power

== Demographics ==
=== Population ===
Historical population

| Year | Pop. | ±% p.a. |
|---|---|---|
| 1859 | 588 | — |
| 1886 | 730 | +0.80% |
| 1911 | 1,185 | +1.96% |
| 1970 | 1,104 | −0.12% |
| 1989 | 1,034 | −0.34% |

| Year | Pop. | ±% p.a. |
|---|---|---|
| 2001 | 900 | −1.15% |
| 2021 | 623 | −1.82% |
| 2022 | 611 | −1.93% |
| 2025 | 72 | −50.97% |

According to the 2001 Ukrainian Census, the only official nationwide census that has been taken in an independent Ukraine, the population of the village stood at 900. The population of the village had grown steadily during the late 1800s in the Russian Empire, reaching a peak just before World War One in 1911 at a population of 1,185 people. Since then, the population has continued to decline from this peak. The most recent oblast-level census was done during the 2020s, when in 2021 there was a population of 623, which had declined to 611 by 2022. Due to the Russian invasion of Ukraine and the ensuing Pokrovsk offensive, most of the residents have been displaced, which has led to a significant drop in people, with a count done just before the village's capture in October 2025 finding 72 people still residing.

=== Languages ===
In Shakhove, according the 2001 Ukrainian Census, the most dominant mother tongue language by far is the Ukrainian language, which was spoken by 93.10% of the population, compared to the Russian language where only 6.67% of the population recorded it as their mother tongue language. This was part of the broader trend observed in the census, where people did not necessarily speak Ukrainian in everyday use, but most people claimed Ukrainian as their mother tongue.

| Languages | 2001 |
|---|---|
| Ukrainian | 93.10% |
| Russian | 6.67% |

== Education ==
There is a central school in the village, which serves as the primary school for the entire hromada, including its 12 surrounding villages. There are three school buses to transport children from those villages to the school. The school operates under the New Ukrainian School (NUS) standards, which first began in 2012. The average class size at the school is 16 children, with classes ranging from 20 to 15 children. It operates as both a primary and upper grade school, although it has a separate primary school building to distinguish the two. The school was renovated recently, and new windows and doors were installed, classrooms were refurbished, and they separated the primary and secondary schools by making the new primary school building.

== Economy ==
The main employer for the village is in the field of clay extraction. Large reserves of clay were found on the territory of the village, and a quarry was opened to extract it. There are two main companies that operate in clay extraction at the village: "Hlyny Donbasu" (Ukrainian: Глини Донбасу; Clays of Donbas) and "Sibelko" (Ukrainian: Сібелко).

== Transport ==
The village sits along the T-0514 highway, which connects Dobropillia to Lyman, and is 6,841 km long. T-0514 is part of the T-network, which is the network within each oblast of Ukraine. In recent years, transportation locally has been greatly limited. Private carriers do not take on routes through most of the entire hromada due to unprofitability. However, the hromada did introduce a social bus for pensioners that ran every Monday along the Dobropillia-Shakhove route. On that route, people were transported for free.

The village is around 24 km from the administrative center of its raion, Pokrovsk.
