= Karlovka =

Karlovka may refer to:

- Karlivka, known as Karlovka until the 1950s
- Karlovka, Donetsk - a village in the Maryinka district, Donetsk Oblast, Ukraine.
- Karlovka, name of several rural settlements in Russia
