= Kucheriv Yar =

Kucheriv Yar Кучерів Яр
- Village
- Location of Novoukrainka within Ukraine Kucheriv Yar (Donetsk Oblast)
- Coordinates: 48°30′23″N 37°16′28″E
- Country: Ukraine
- Oblast: Donetsk Oblast
- Raion: Pokrovsk Raion
- Hromada: Shakhove rural hromada

Population (2026)
  - Total: 0
- Time zone: UTC+2 (EET)
  - Summer (DST): UTC+3 (EEST)
- Postal code: 85018
- Area code: +380 6277
- KATOTTH: UA14160270100036947

Kucheriv Yar (Ukrainian: Кучерів Яр) is a Ukrainian village in the Pokrovsk Raion in Donetsk Oblast.

== History ==
During the Russo-Ukrainian war, Russian forces briefly captured the village before Ukrainian forces retook it.

== Notable people ==
- Faina Melnik (1945–2016), Soviet discus thrower and 1972 Olympic champion
