= Olhynka Raion =

Olhynka Raion Ольгинський район
- Raion
- Country: Soviet Union
- Republic: Ukrainian SSR
- Oblast: Donetsk Oblast
- Established: 13 February 1935
- Abolished: 10 September 1959
- Admin. center: Olhynka

Olhynka Raion (Ukrainian: Ольгинський район) was a raion (district) of Donetsk Oblast in the Ukrainian Soviet Socialist Republic from 1935 until 1959. Its administrative center was Olhynka.

== History ==
It was formed on 13 February 1935 as Anadol Raion (Ukrainian: Анадольський район). On 31 August the same year, it was renamed to Olhynka Raion.

On 10 September 1959, Olhynka Raion was abolished. Its former territory was split between Volnovakha Raion and Marinka Raion.
