= Dorozhnie, Donetsk Oblast =

Village in Donetsk Oblast, Ukraine

Dorozhnie Дорожнє
- Rural settlement
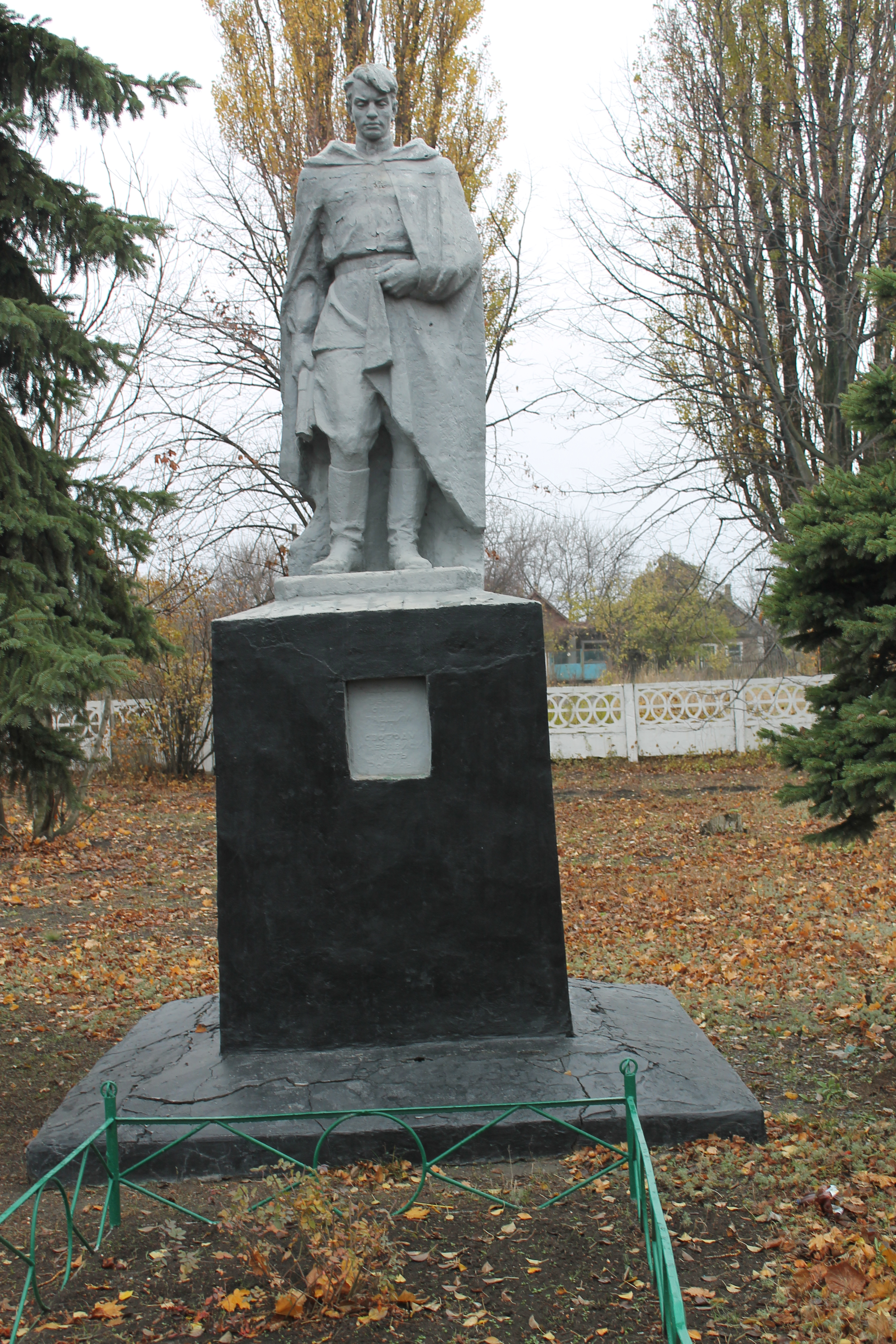
- Mass grave of Soviet soldiers of the South-Western Front

- Location of Dorozhnie Dorozhnie (Ukraine)
- Coordinates: 48°25′26″N 37°13′16″E
- Country: Ukraine
- Oblast: Donetsk Oblast
- Raion: Pokrovsk Raion
- Hromada: Shakhove rural hromada

Population (2001)
  - Total: 63
- Time zone: UTC+2 (EET)
  - Summer (DST): UTC+3 (EEST)
- Postal code: 85053
- Area code: +380 6277
- Climate: Dfa

Dorozhnie (Ukrainian: Дорожнє) is a rural settlement in the Shakhove rural hromada, Pokrovsk Raion, Donetsk Oblast, Ukraine. The 2021 census had a population of 63

== History ==
On July 27, 2015, the village became part of the newly created Shakhove rural hromada.
