= Nove Shakhove =

Village in Donetsk Oblast, Ukraine

Nove Shakhove Нове Шахове
- Village
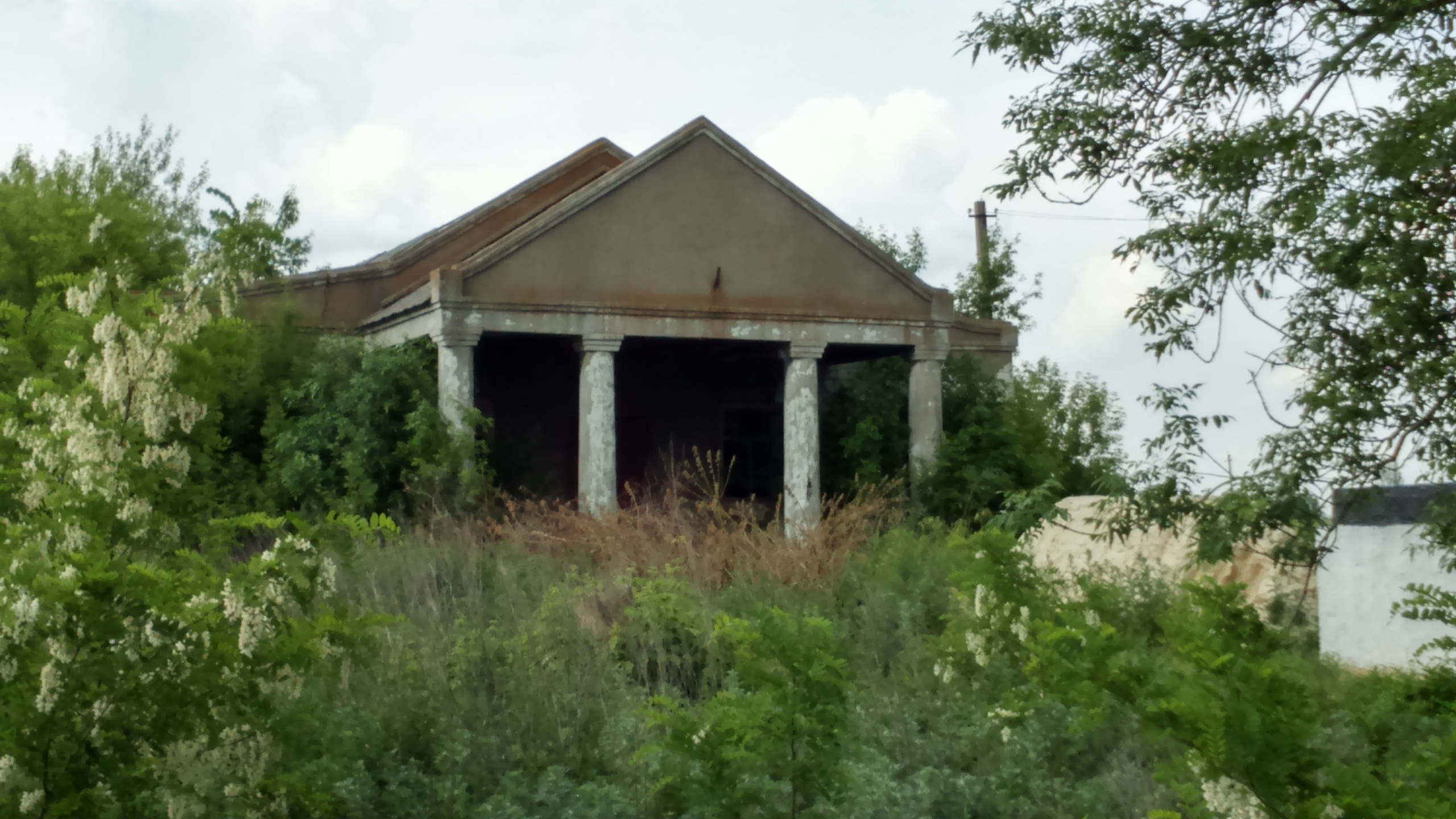
- The House of Culture in Nove Shakhove

- Location of Nove Shakhove Nove Shakhove (Ukraine)
- Coordinates: 48°27′5″N 37°14′25″E
- Country: Ukraine
- Oblast: Donetsk Oblast
- Raion: Pokrovsk Raion
- Hromada: Shakhove rural hromada
- Founded: 1891

Population (2001)
  - Total: 191
- Time zone: UTC+2 (EET)
  - Summer (DST): UTC+3 (EEST)
- Postal code: 85053
- Area code: +380 6277
- Climate: Dfa

Nove Shakhove (Ukrainian: Нове Шахове) is a village in the Shakhove rural hromada, Pokrovsk Raion, Donetsk Oblast, Ukraine.

== History ==
The village was originally named Khristianivka, before being renamed Rosa Luxemburg, in honor of the labour activist of the same name. In accordance with the Law of Ukraine "On the Condemnation of the Communist and National Socialist (Nazi) Totalitarian Regimes in Ukraine and the Prohibition of Propaganda of Their Symbols", the village was renamed to its modern name.

The village was affected by the Russo-Ukrainian war, due to its location near the front line in Donetsk.

== Gallery ==
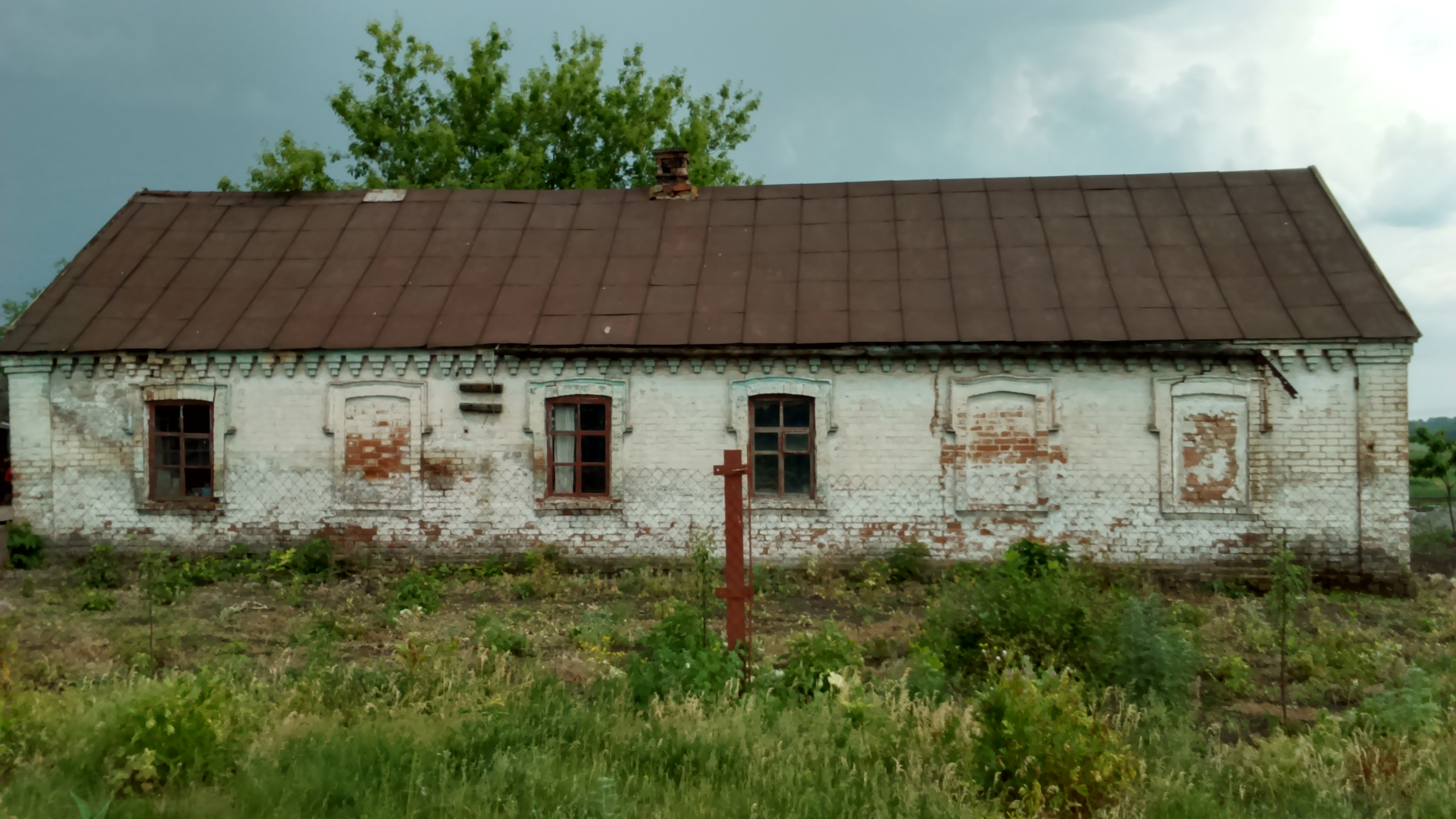
House of German Colonists

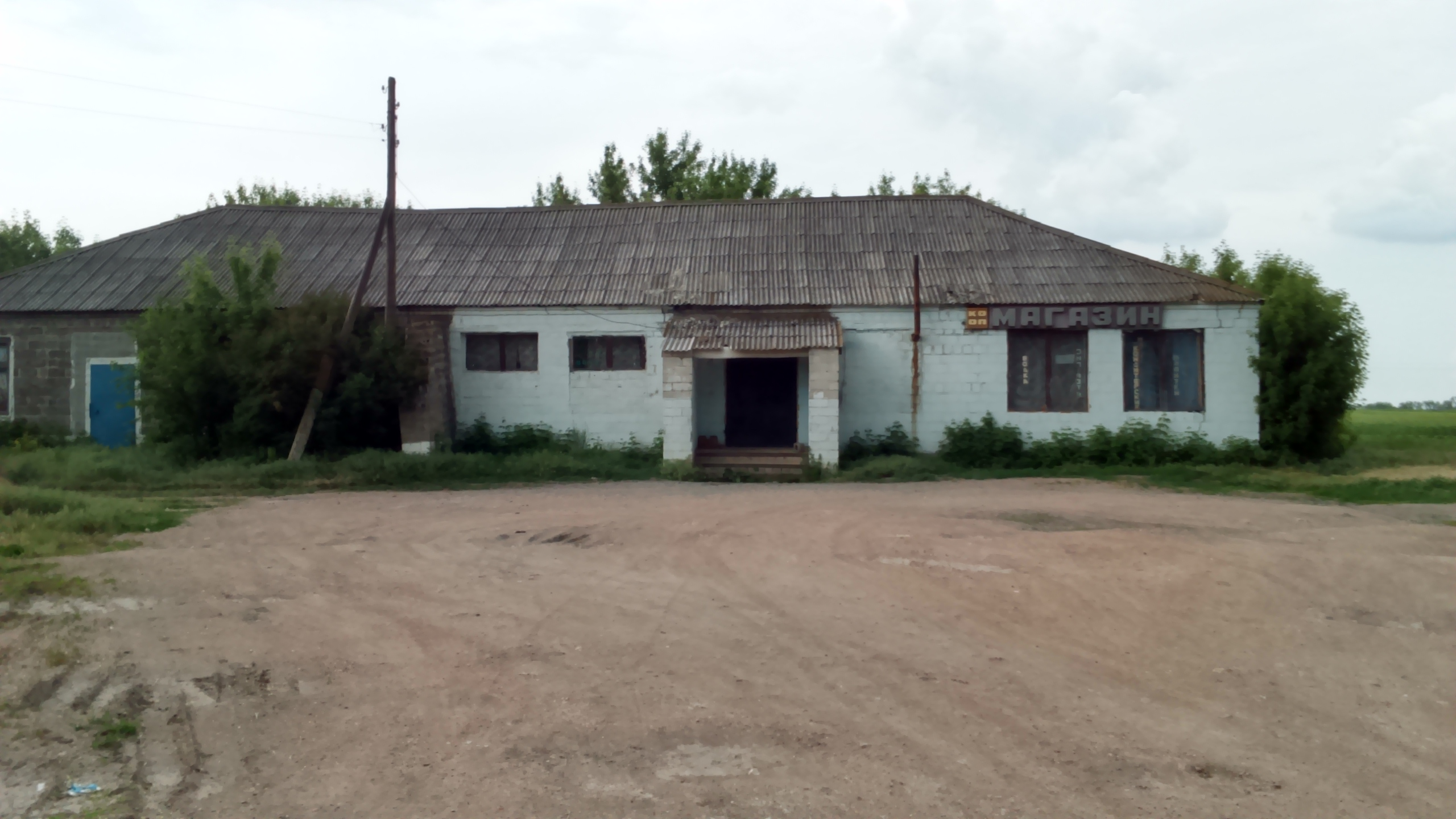
The village's shop.

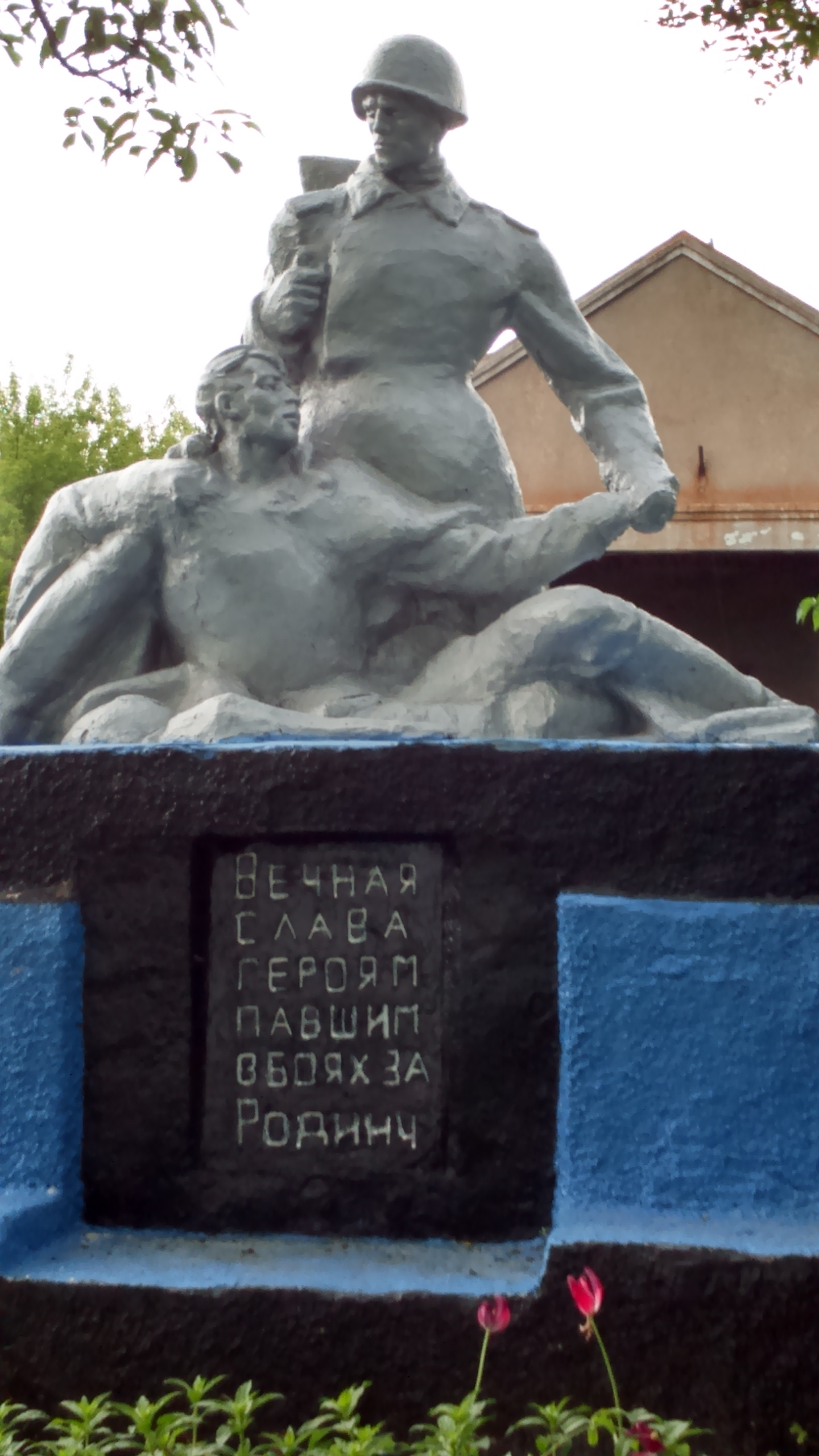
Monument to soldiers of the Second World War

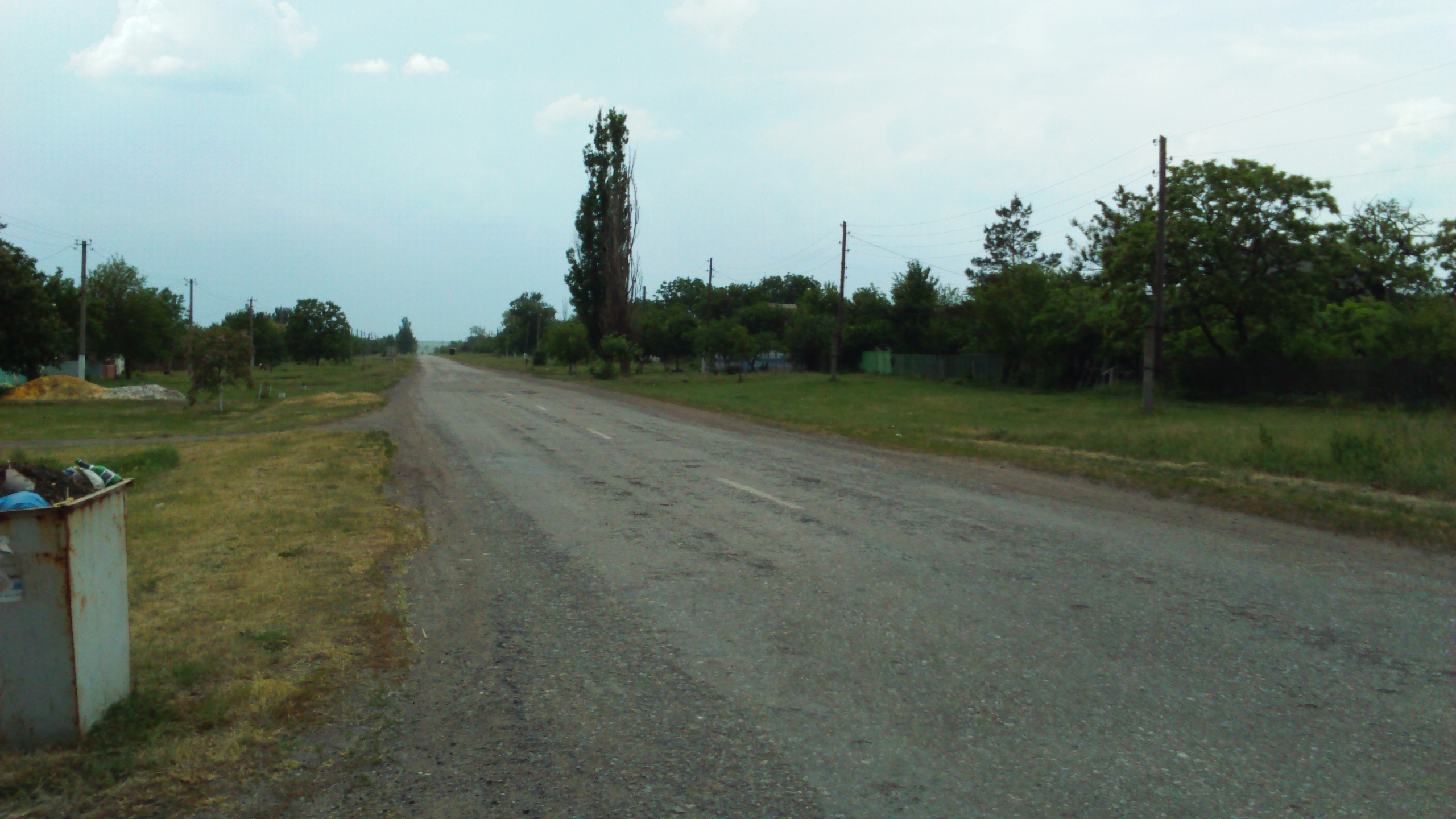
Nove Shakhove central street
