= Zatyshok, Donetsk Oblast =

Zatyshok Затишок
- Village
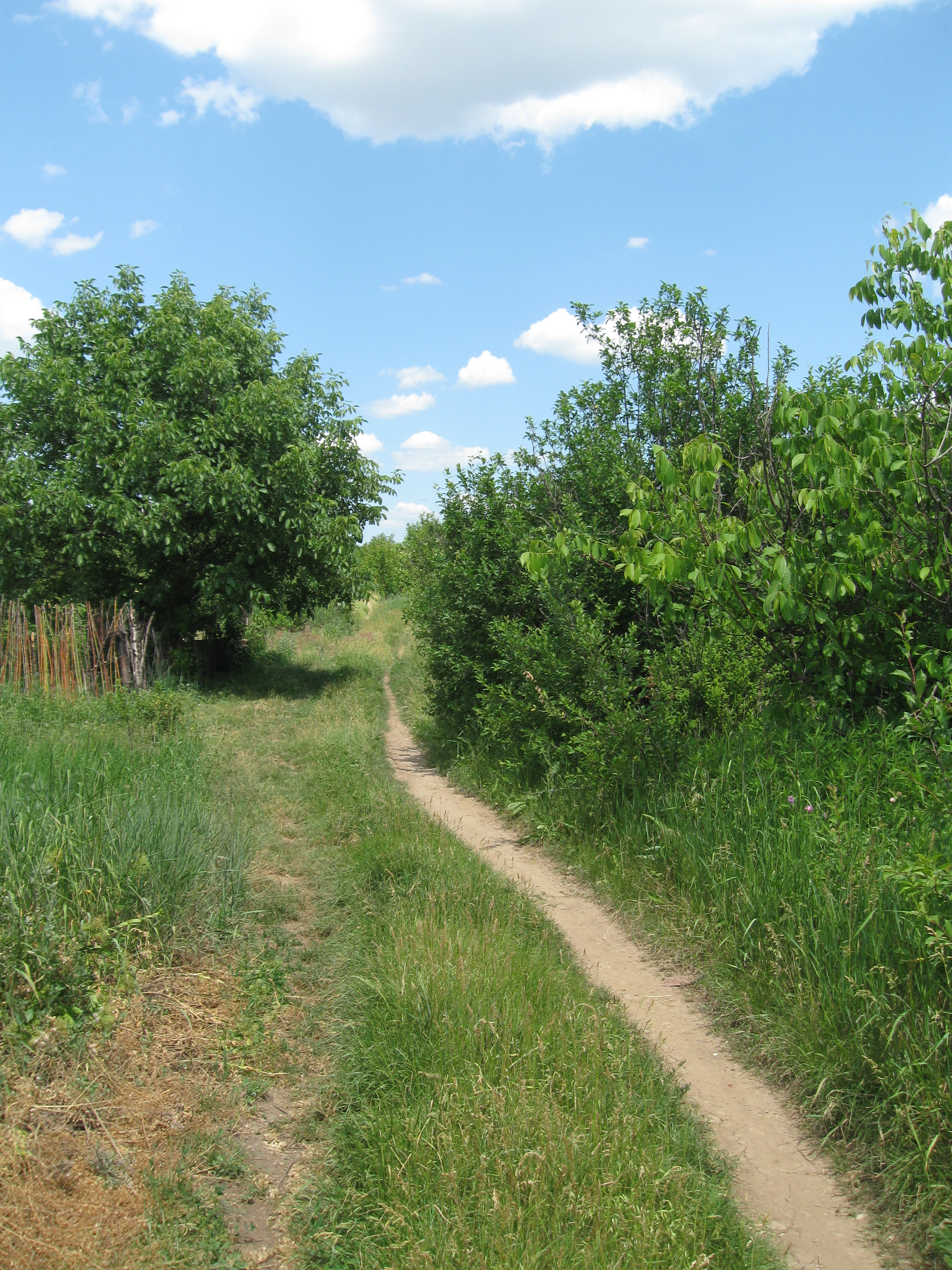

- Location of Zatyshok Zatyshok (Ukraine)
- Coordinates: 48°23′16″N 37°15′17″E
- Country: Ukraine
- Oblast: Donetsk Oblast
- Raion: Pokrovsk Raion
- Hromada: Shakhove rural hromada
- Elevation: 178 m (584 ft)

Population (2001)
  - Total: 62
- Time zone: UTC+2 (EET)
  - Summer (DST): UTC+3 (EEST)
- Postal code: 85030
- Area code: +380 6277
- Climate: Dfa

Zatyshok (Ukrainian: Затишок), formerly known as Suvorove (Ukrainian: Суворове), is a village (a selo) in the Pokrovsk Raion (district) of Donetsk Oblast in eastern Ukraine.

== History ==
In 2024 the Verkhovna Rada renamed the village as a part of the derussification campaign.

=== Russian invasion of Ukraine ===
Following the Russian invasion of Ukraine, the village was occupied by Russian forces in August 2025.

== Local government ==
Until 18 July 2020, Suvorove belonged to Dobropillia Raion. The raion was abolished that day as part of the administrative reform of Ukraine, which reduced the number of raions of Donetsk Oblast to eight, of which only five were controlled by the government. The Dobropillia Raion was merged into Pokrovsk Raion.
