= Shakhove rural hromada =

Shakhove rural hromada Шахівська сільська громада
- Hromada
- Interactive map of Shakhove rural hromada
- Country: Ukraine
- Oblast: Donetsk
- Raion: Pokrovsk

Area
  - Total: 354.4 km^{2} (136.8 sq mi)

Population (2020)
  - Total: 4,021
  - Density: 11.35/km^{2} (29.39/sq mi)
- Settlements: 22
- Rural settlements: 2
- Villages: 20

Shakhove rural hromada (Ukrainian: Шахівська сільська громада) is a hromada of Ukraine, located in Pokrovsk Raion, Donetsk Oblast. Its administrative center is the village of Shakhove.

It has an area of 354.4 square kilometres (136.8 mi^{2}) and a population of 4,021, as of 2020.

The hromada contains 22 settlements, including 20 villages:

- Boikivka
- Vesele
- Vilne
- Volodymyrivka
- Hruzke
- Zolotyi Kolodiaz
- Ivanivka
- Koptieve
- Kucheriv Yar
- Lidyne
- Marivka
- Zapovidne
- Nove Shakhove
- Novotoretske
- Novotroitske
- Pankivka
- Petrivka
- Zatyshok
- Toretske
- Shakhove

And 2 rural-type settlements: Dorozhnie and Maiak.

The village of Shakhove, the administrative center of the hromada, was seized sometime in early December 2025, at least prior to 25 December, during the Pokrovsk offensive according to the Institute for the Study of War. The rest of the villages in the hromada currently remained in contention, with most of the area in a grey zone except for some of the more northern villages.

== See also ==
- List of hromadas of Ukraine
