= Zolotyi Kolodiaz =

Village in Donetsk Oblast, Ukraine

Zolotyi Kolodiaz Золотий Колодязь
- Village
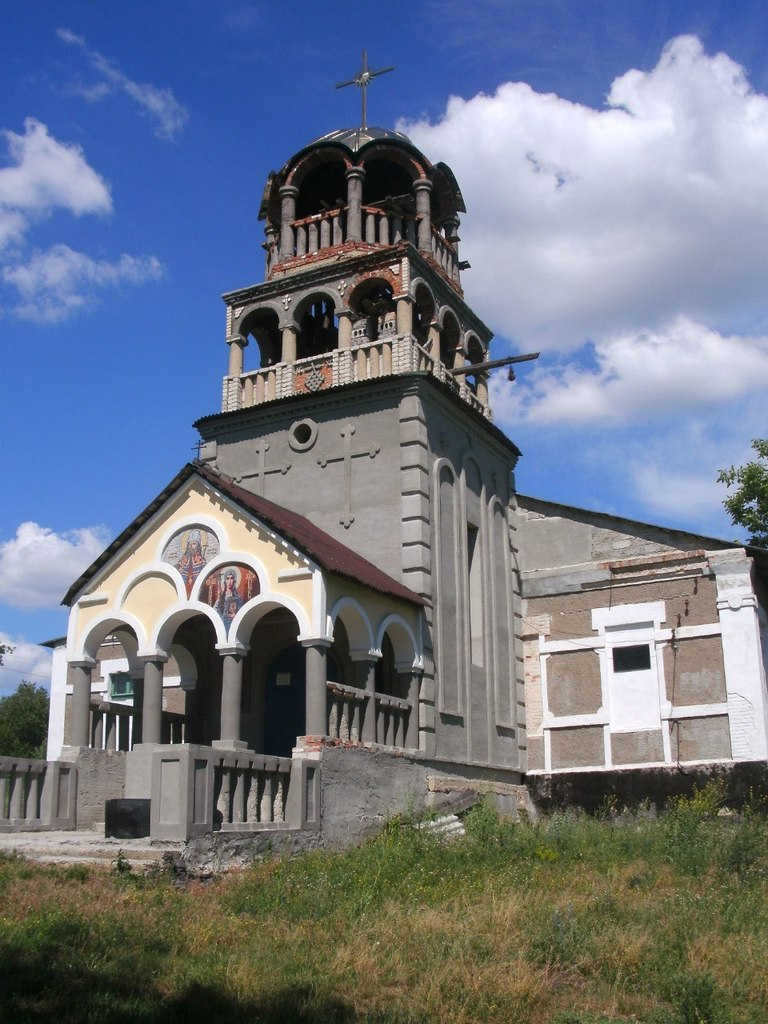
- St. Demetrius Church

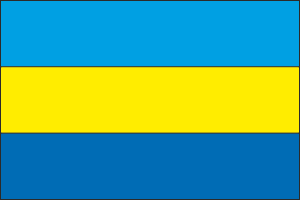
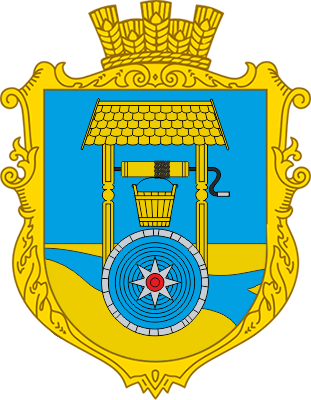
- Flag Coat of arms

- Location of Zolotyi Kolodiaz Zolotyi Kolodiaz (Ukraine)
- Country: Ukraine
- Oblast: Donetsk Oblast
- Raion: Pokrovsk Raion
- Hromada: Shakhove rural hromada
- Founded: 1776

Population (2025)
  - Total: 24
- Time zone: UTC+2 (EET)
  - Summer (DST): UTC+3 (EEST)
- Postal code: 85018
- Area code: +380 6277

Zolotyi Kolodiaz (Ukrainian: Золотий Колодязь) is a village in the Shakhove rural hromada, Pokrovsk Raion, Donetsk Oblast, Ukraine. It is located on the banks of the Hruzka River. It belongs to the historical Kramatorsk Land.

== History ==
The village appeared in 1680 as a settlement founded by the landowner Levshin

According to the 1989 census of the Ukrainian SSR, the population of the village was 904 people, of which 413 were men and 491 were women.

=== Russian invasion of Ukraine ===
In the morning of August 13th, 2025, it was reported that there were 24 residents in Zolotyi Kolodiaz.

During August 4–16, 2025, the NGU and the Armed Forces of Ukraine as part of the 1st Corps of the NGU "Azov" liberated and cleared the settlements of Hruzke, Rubizhne, Novovodiane, Petrivka, Vesele, and Zolotyi Kolodiaz from Russian control.
