= Olhynka =

Urban locality in Donetsk Oblast, Ukraine

Olhynka Ольгинка
- Rural settlement
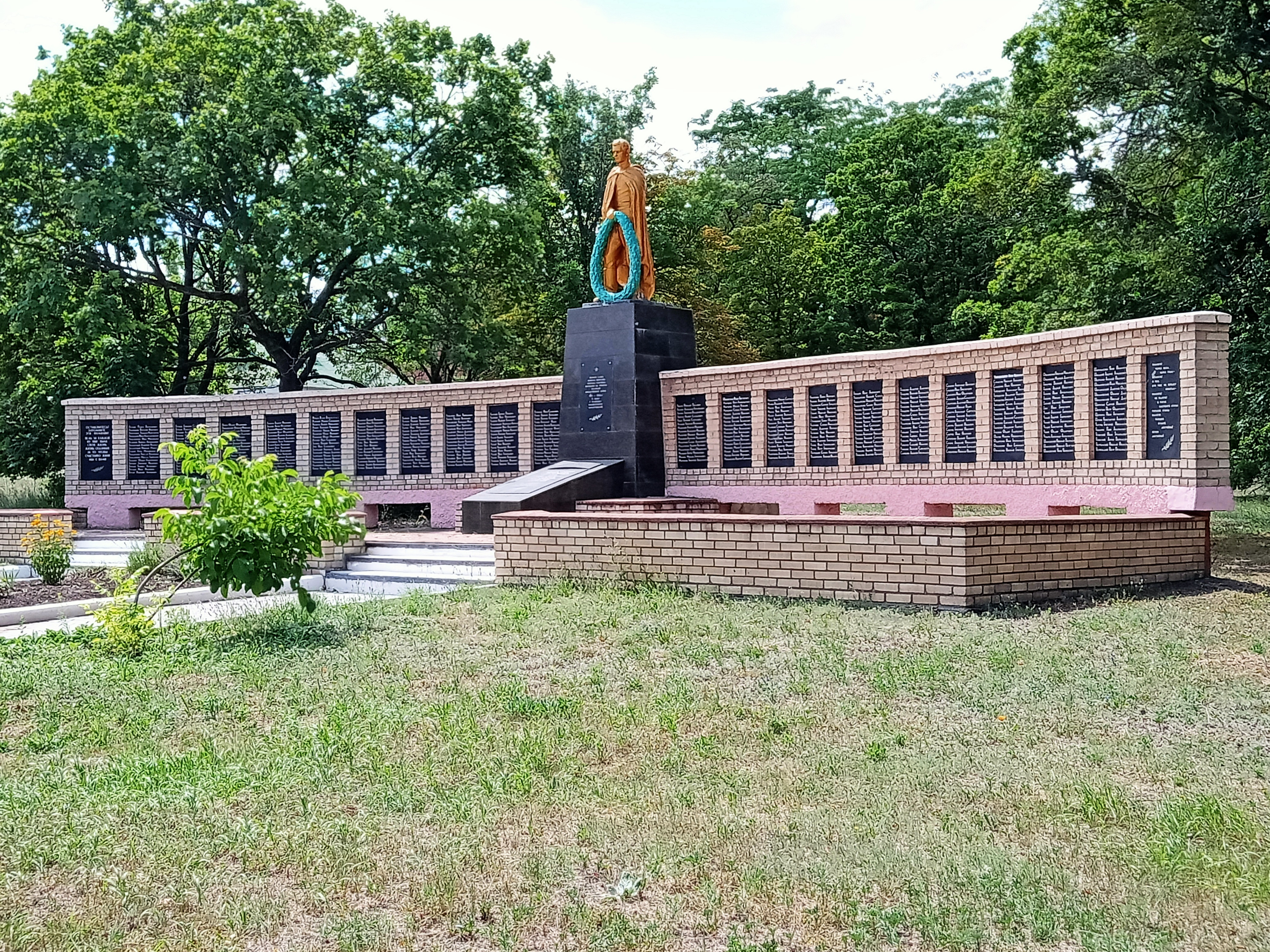

- Location of Olhynka within Donetsk Oblast#Location of Olhynka within Ukraine Olhynka (Ukraine)
- Coordinates: 47°42′N 37°30′E
- Country: Ukraine
- Oblast: Donetsk Oblast
- Raion: Volnovakha Raion
- Founded: 1779
- Elevation: 228 m (748 ft)

Population (2022)
  - Total: 2,929
- Time zone: UTC+2 (EET)
  - Summer (DST): UTC+3 (EEST)
- Postal code: 85730—85731
- Area code: +380 6244

Olhynka (Ukrainian: Ольгинка) is an urban-type settlement in Volnovakha Raion, Donetsk Oblast, eastern Ukraine. Its population is 2,929 (2022 estimate). From 1935 to 1959, it was the administrative center of Olhynka Raion.

== Demographics ==
As of the 2001 Ukrainian census, Olhynka had a population of 3,553 inhabitants, which decreased to 2,929 in early 2022. The linguistic composition of the town in 2001 was as follows:

Native languages in Olhynka
	percent
Ukrainian	75.2%
Russian	24.3%
Belarusian	0.1%
others	0.3%
