= Serhii Sazhko =

Ukrainian politician (born 1969)

Serhii Mykolaiovych Sazhko
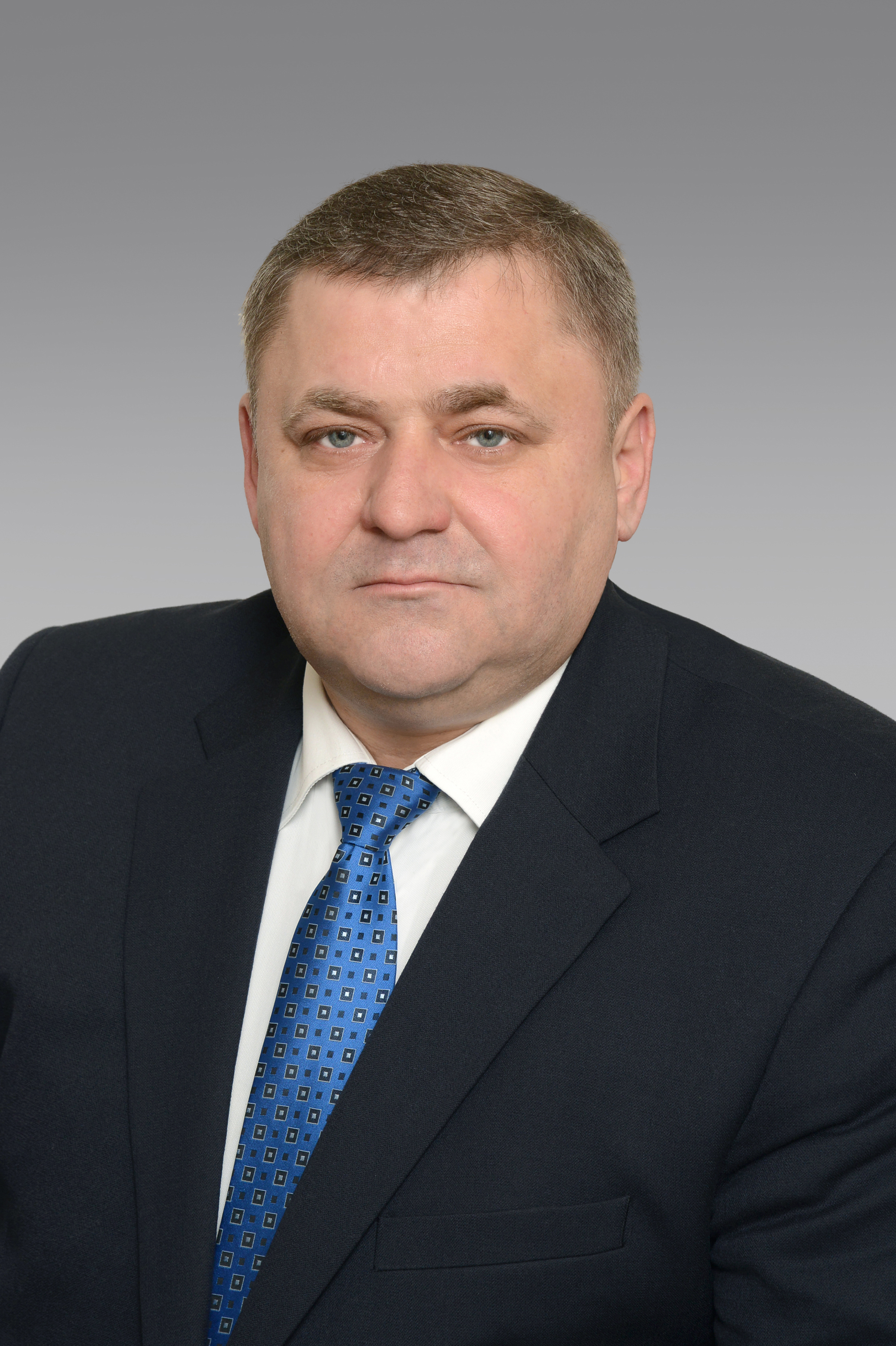

People's Deputy of Ukraine
- In office 27 November 2014 – 29 August 2019

Mayor of Kurakhove
- In office 31 October 2010 – 17 November 2014
- Preceded by: Yuriy Kharanfil

Personal details
- Born: 19 July 1969 (age 56) Hannivka, Marinka Raion, Donetsk Oblast, Ukrainian SSR, Soviet Union (now Ukraine)
- Party: Opposition Bloc

Serhii Mykolaiovych Sazhko (Ukrainian: Сергій Миколайович Сажко; born 19 July 1969) is a Ukrainian politician who was a member of the 8th Ukrainian Verkhovna Rada and former mayor of Kurakhove.

== Biography ==
He was born on July 19, 1969, in the village of Hannivka, Marinka Raion, Donetsk Oblast, Ukrainian SSR, USSR, into a family of rural workers.

In the autumn parliamentary elections of 2014, he was elected as a deputy from single-member district No. 59. He was an independent candidate and joined the faction of the "Opposition Bloc" after taking the oath.

== Education ==
- 1995–1999 – Kurakhivka branch of "Dnipropetrovsk Energy Construction College".
- 2001–2005 – "National Technical University", specializing as a thermal engineer.
- 2013–2016 – "National Academy of Public Administration under the President of Ukraine" specializing in "Public Administration".

== Military service ==
1987–1989 served in the Republic of Afghanistan. Participant of combat actions.

== Work experience ==
- 1985 – worked as a tractor driver in the collective farm "Soviet Ukraine" in the village of Uspenivka, Marinsky District.
- 1989–1993 – locksmith-former.
- 1994–2009 – Kurakhivka TPP, energy block operator, head of the thermal underground communications and hydraulic structures shop.
- 2009 – appointed deputy mayor of Kurakhove, deputy head of the Donetsk branch of the Association of Cities of Ukraine for small cities.
- 2010–2014 – mayor of Kurakhove.

== Parliamentary activity ==
- 2014 – People's Deputy of the VIII convocation, elected from electoral district No. 59, Donetsk Oblast, independent candidate.
- Date of assumption of deputy powers: November 27, 2014.
- Member of the deputy faction of the Political Party "Opposition Bloc" in the Verkhovna Rada of Ukraine of the eighth convocation.
- Head of the Subcommittee on Civil Protection of the Population, Prevention and Elimination of Consequences of Technogenic or Natural Emergencies of the VRU Committee on Environmental Policy, Natural Resource Use, and Elimination of the Consequences of the Chornobyl Disaster.
- On January 18, 2018, he was one of 36 deputies who voted against the Law on Recognizing Ukrainian Sovereignty over the Occupied Territories of Donetsk and Luhansk Regions.

He was one of 59 deputies who signed the submission based on which the Constitutional Court of Ukraine canceled the article of the Criminal Code of Ukraine on illegal enrichment, which required public officials to explain the sources of their income and the income of their family members. Criminal liability for illegal enrichment in Ukraine was introduced in 2015. This was one of the requirements of the EU for the implementation of the Visa Liberalization Action Plan, as well as one of Ukraine's obligations to the IMF, secured in the memorandum.

== Family ==
Married, raising two children.
