= Marinka Raion =

Former subdivision of Donetsk Oblast, Ukraine

Marinka Raion Мар'їнський район
- Raion
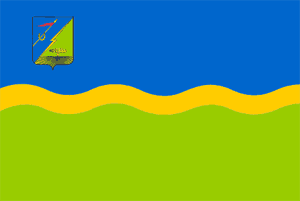
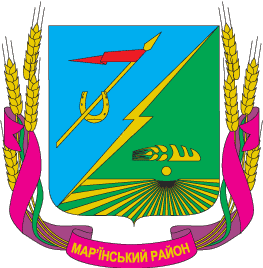
- Flag Coat of arms

- Coordinates: 47°56′30″N 37°30′46″E
- Country: Ukraine
- Region: Donetsk Oblast
- Established: February 1923
- Disestablished: 18 July 2020
- Admin. center: Marinka
- Subdivisions: List: — city councils; — settlement councils; — rural councils; Number of localities: — cities; — urban-type settlements; — villages; — rural settlements

Government
  - Governor: Roman Havrin

Area
  - Total: 1,350.5 km^{2} (521.4 sq mi)
- Elevation: 152 m (499 ft)

Population (2020)
  - Total: 79,117
  - Density: 58.583/km^{2} (151.73/sq mi)
- Time zone: UTC+02:00 (EET)
  - Summer (DST): UTC+03:00 (EEST)
- Postal index: 85600-85683
- Area code: +380-6278
- Website: http://www.donoda.gov.ua

Marinka Raion (Ukrainian: Мар'їнський район; Russian: Марьинский район) was a raion (district) of Donetsk Oblast (province) located in eastern Ukraine from 1923 to 2020. Its administrative center was the city of Marinka. The last estimate of the raion population was 79,117 (2020 est.).

== History ==
The district was created in February 1923 as part of Donets Governorate of the Ukrainian Soviet Socialist Republic. In 1932, it became part of the newly created Donetsk Oblast. In 1933, three village councils were transferred from the Stalino (now Donetsk) city council to Marinka Raion. During World War II, the raion was occupied by Nazi Germany between October 1941 and September 1943, who committed atrocities against the local population. In September 1959, when Olhynka Raion was abolished, part of its former territory was transferred to Marinka Raion.

In 2014, during the war in Donbas, small eastern parts of Marinka Raion were taken over by the self-styled Donetsk People's Republic, a Russian-backed breakaway state claiming the territory of all of Ukraine's Donetsk Oblast. Due to the violence, many residents of the raion became refugees, fleeing their homes in eastern Marinka Raion to other parts of Ukraine or to other countries. To facilitate administration, both the Ukrainian government and the authorities of the Donetsk People's Republic transferred this area to other administrative units, so that the amended area of the raion remained under control of the government.

The raion was abolished on 18 July 2020 as part of the administrative reform of Ukraine, which reduced the number of raions of Donetsk Oblast to eight, of which only five were controlled by the government. The last estimate of the raion population was 79,117 (2020 est.).

== Demographics ==
Its population was 90,434 as of the 2001 Ukrainian Census. According to the 2001 census, the self-reported ethnic background of the people of the raion was:

| Ethnicity | Number | Proportion |
|---|---|---|
| Ukrainians | 70,703 | 78.5% |
| Russians | 16,589 | 18.4% |
| Greeks | 958 | 1.1% |
| Belarusians | 495 | 0.5% |
| Bulgarians | 230 | 0.3% |
| Armenians | 190 | 0.2% |
| Azerbaijanis | 106 | 0.1% |

In terms of religion, most of the population of the raion were followers of the Ukrainian Orthodox Church (Moscow Patriarchate), but there was also a Protestant community.

== See also ==
- Administrative divisions of Ukraine
