= List of sculptures of Vladimir Lenin =

This article is a list of current and former known sculptures of Vladimir Lenin. Many of the monuments in former Soviet republics and people's republics were removed after the fall of the Soviet Union, while some of these countries, mainly Russia and Belarus, retained the thousands of Lenin statues that were erected during the Soviet period.

Important regions and capital cities are highlighted in bold.

== Africa ==
Country	Location	Installed	Removed	Notes
Ethiopia	Africa Park, Addis Ababa	October 1983	1991	The first Lenin statue in Africa, this monument was constructed in October 1983. The statue was toppled with the fall of the Derg government in 1991.
Mauritius	Port Louis	1972	No	

== Americas ==
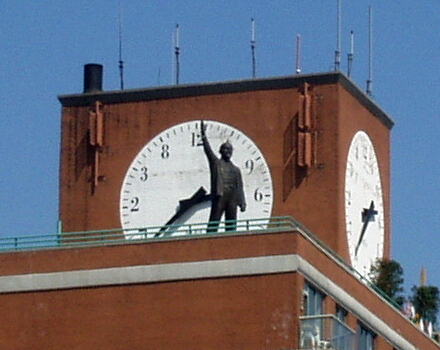
Lenin on top of building, East Village, New York City

Country	Location	Installed	Removed	Notes
Canada	Richmond, BC	2008	2011	A small statue of Mao Zedong on top of a large stainless steel Lenin bust. Displayed in Richmond from 2008 to 2011.
Cuba	Havana	?	?	Monumento a Lenin, in Parque Lenin.
Cuba	Havana	?	?	Colina Lenin in Regla.
Cuba	Santa Cruz del Norte	?	?	In a petroleum plant.
Cuba	Holguin	?	?	In Vladimir Lenin Hospital.
United States	Las Vegas	?	2019	Outside Red Square Restaurant, Mandalay Bay Hotel. Removed in 2019 when restaurant closed.
United States	New York City	1994	No	The East Village Lenin Statue, on top of the Red Square apartment building, E. Houston St. in the East Village. Moved to Norfolk St. in 2016, half-block south.
United States	Seattle	1995	No	Fremont neighborhood; see Statue of Lenin (Seattle).
United States	ACE Gallery Los Angeles	2011	2017	There was a large metallic bust of Lenin on display at the corner of La Brea Avenue and 4th Street.
United States	Hutchinson, Kansas	?	?	Inside the Soviet wing of the Cosmosphere.
United States	Willimantic, Connecticut	?	Date of removal in Ukraine unknown, still standing in Willmantic	Hidden in a scrapyard to avoid vandalism. Was acquired from a shipment of scrap metal from Ukraine, presumably included either for use as scrap or in hopes that it would be preserved for its historical value. Its specific city of origin is unknown, as it was not expected in the shipment, though it was noted that the bolts that would have held it to its base were warped, suggesting that it was toppled.
Venezuela	Caracas	November 13, 2017	No	Lenin bust, unveiled at 100th anniversary of Bolshevik Revolution.

== Antarctica ==
Country	Location	Installed	Removed	Notes
Antarctica	Pole of Inaccessibility	December 1958	No	Plastic bust left by Soviet scientists in December 1958.

The golden bust of Lenin still stands as of 2025.

== Asia ==
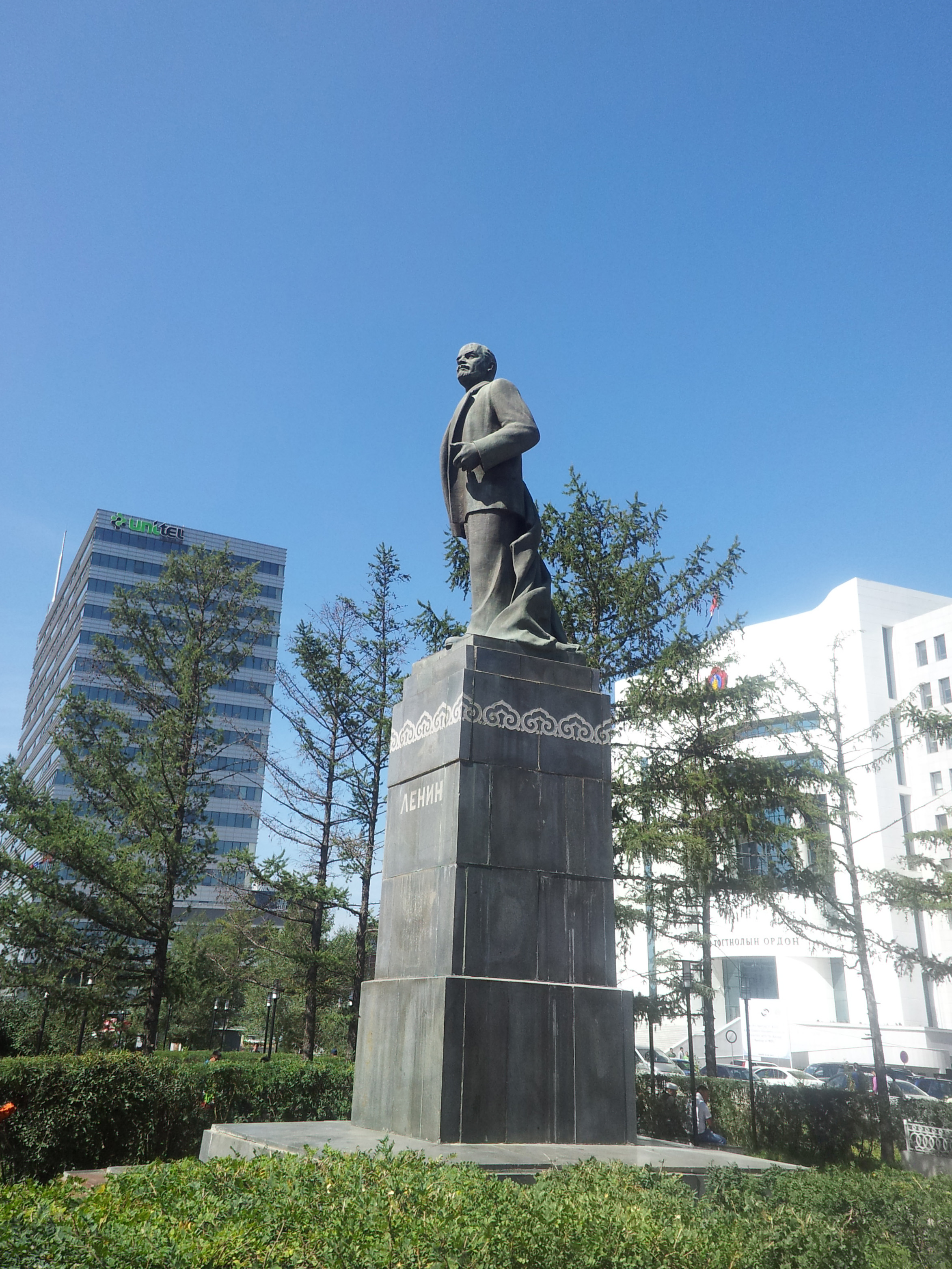
In Ulaanbaatar, Mongolia; removed on October 14, 2012

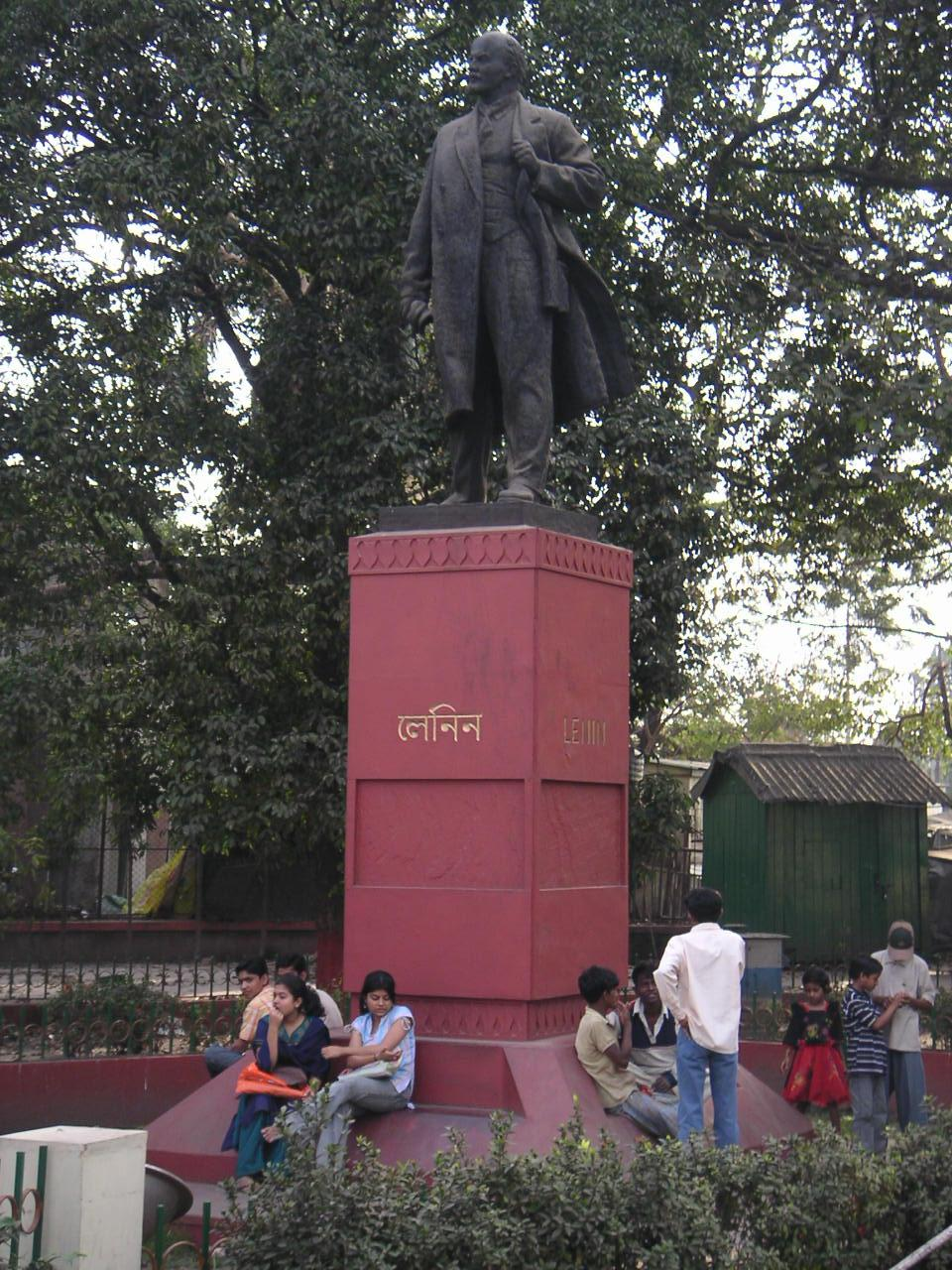
In Kolkata, India

Country	Location	Installed	Removed	Notes
Armenia	Republic Square, Yerevan	November 24, 1940	April 13, 1991	Since being taken down it has been stored in the courtyard of the National Art Gallery behind Republic Square, with the head detached.
Armenia	Vanadzor	?	?	What is said to be the first-ever statue of Lenin is still standing in the Arbanyak Soviet Camp outside of Vanadzor. It was erected during his lifetime.
Armenia	Amasia	1985	?	Near Gyumri (the former Leninakan). Built in 1985 and kept in Amasia ever since.
Armenia	Arin	c. 1991	No	Built in 1947, moved to Arin after the dissolution of the USSR.
Azerbaijan	Baku	?	c. 1990	The central monument was in front of the Government House, but was removed during the mass uprisings of 1990.
China	Dongcheng District, Beijing	?	No	Wax statue
India	Kolkata	<1972	No	At the mouth of Lenin Sarani in Esplanade, Jadavpur 8B bus stand.
India	Vijayawada	1987	No	
India	Nehru Park, Delhi, Chanakyapuri	November 1, 1987	No	A life-size statue was erected on November 1, 1987, during the 70th anniversary of the October Revolution. It was unveiled by then Soviet Premier Nikolai Ryzhkov, Indian Prime-minister Rajiv Gandhi and his wife Sonia Gandhi. Every year on April 22 members of the Communist Party of India and other Left-oriented political parties visit the place to commemorate Lenin's birthday.
India	AKG Bhawan, New Delhi	2010	?	A large bust of Lenin is located in the headquarters of the Communist Party of India in New Delhi. The white bust is installed right in front of the bust of A. K. Gopalan. The bust was a gift from the Communist Party of the Soviet Union. Before its final installation in the year 2010 it remained isolated in the Headquarters' backyard for several years.
India	Belonia, Tripura	2013	March 5, 2018	A statue of Lenin was installed at Cege Square in 2013. Within days of winning the 2018 Tripura Legislative Assembly election, the statue was bulldozed by suspects who were arrested without warrant.
India	Sabroom, Tripura	?	2018	Another such statue was erected by the Communist Party of India – governed state until their electoral defeat by the Bharatiya Janata Party in 2018, when it was razed to the ground by supporters of the party. Bharatiya Janata Party condemned the incident.
India	Katwa, West Bengal	?	?	Red Ink thrown at the statue in 2019.
India	Kalyani, West Bengal	?	?	Bust exists on main crossing.
India	Tirunelveli, Tamil Nadu	?	?	Tallest Lenin statue in India located outside the local CPI(M) office.
Kazakhstan	Baikonur	?	?	Located in the central square of the city.
Kazakhstan	Almaty	November 7, 1957 (Astana Square); 1997 (Sary-Arka square)	1997 (Astana Square)	Formerly located in Astana square (formerly:Vladimir Lenin square), changed to locate at Sary-Arka square
Kazakhstan	Karaganda	?	?	
Kazakhstan	Kokshetau	?	?	
Kazakhstan	Semey	?	?	
Kyrgyzstan	Multiple places	?	?	Nearly every city and village in the country has a Lenin statue, usually located in the central square.
Kyrgyzstan	Bishkek	?	?	Removed from the central square and now located behind the State Historical Museum.
Kyrgyzstan	Osh	1975	2025	
Kyrgyzstan	Karakol	?	?	
Kyrgyzstan	Kochkor	?	?	
Mongolia	Ulaanbaatar	?	October 14, 2012	In front of Ulaanbaatar Hotel and in close proximity to the Mongolian People's Party headquarters. In a speech during the removal ceremony, Mayor Erdeniin Bat-Üül denounced Lenin and his fellow communists as "murderers".
Tajikistan	Dushanbe	?	?	The monument in central Freedom Square was replaced by a monument of Ismoil Somoni, while a second in Central Park was removed and replaced by a statue of Rudaki, Khujand, Nurak, Faizobod.
Tajikistan	Istaravshan	?	?	
Tajikistan	Khojand	?	?	
Tajikistan	Khorog	?	?	
Tajikistan	Murghab	?	?	
Tajikistan	Panjakent	?	?	
Turkmenistan	Ashgabat	1927	?	Erected in 1927 in the heart of the city.
Uzbekistan	Tashkent	?	1991	Dismantled in 1991, replaced with a globe, featuring a geographic map of Uzbekistan.
Vietnam	Hanoi	August 20, 1985	No	Dien Bien Phu Street, adjacent to the Vietnamese Army museum. A 5.2m high bronze statue donated by the Soviet Government with the image of Lenin in a walking posture, placed on a 2.7m high granite pedestal.
Vietnam	Vinh	June 14, 2024		3.6m tall
North Korea	Pyongyang	?	?	In the Workers' Party of Korea Founding Museum.
North Korea	Pyongyang	?	?	Russia-DPRK Embassy
North Korea	Hamhung	?	?	Soviet war memorial

== Europe ==
=== Bulgaria ===
- Shumen
- Novgrad
- Sofia – in Lenin Square (now St Nedelya Square), installed in 1966 and pulled down in January 1991; the site is now occupied by the Statue of Sofia

=== Czech Republic ===
- Vítězné náměstí (formerly náměstí Říjnové Revoluce) – in the Dejvice quarter of **Prague**, pulled down in 1990; a war memorial now stands on the site
- **Karlovy Vary** – Theatre Square (formerly Lenin Square), pulled down in 1990.
- **Cheb** – Built in 1979, it was located in front of Cheb railway station until 1990, it is now located at the garden of the Franciscan Monastery

=== Denmark ===
- **Worker's Museum, Copenhagen** – relocated from Hørsholm where it stood from 1986 until 1996

=== Estonia ===
- Jõhvi – 1953–1991, sculptors Enn Roos, Arseni Mölder, Signe Mölder
- Kohtla-Järve – 1950–1992, copy of statue in Jõhvi
- Kallaste – 1988–19??
- Narva – 1957–1993, sculptor Olav Männi (21/12/1993-21/12/2022 statue present inside Narva Castle)
- Pärnu
  - 1950s–1981
  - 1981–1990, sculptor Matti Varik created a replica of a monument built in Kotka in 1979
- **Tallinn** – 1950–1991, sculptor Nikolai Tomsky
- Tartu
  - 1949–1952 sitting Lenin (ferroconcrete), sculptor Sergey Merkurov
  - 1952–1990 standing Lenin bronze, height 3.5 m, weight 3.5 tons; sculptors August Vomm, Garibald Pommer, Ferdi Sannamaes

=== Finland ===
- Kotka – at Lenin park, by sculptor Matti Varik, removed on June 14, 2022
- Turku – near the art museum, removed in 2022
- Tampere – inside Lenin museum

=== France ===
- Montpellier

=== Georgia ===
- **Tbilisi** – monument stood until 1991 in Freedom Square (Tavisuplebis Moedani)
- Kvaisa – a white marble statue of Lenin currently stands in the town square (In the unrecognized South Ossetia)

=== Germany ===
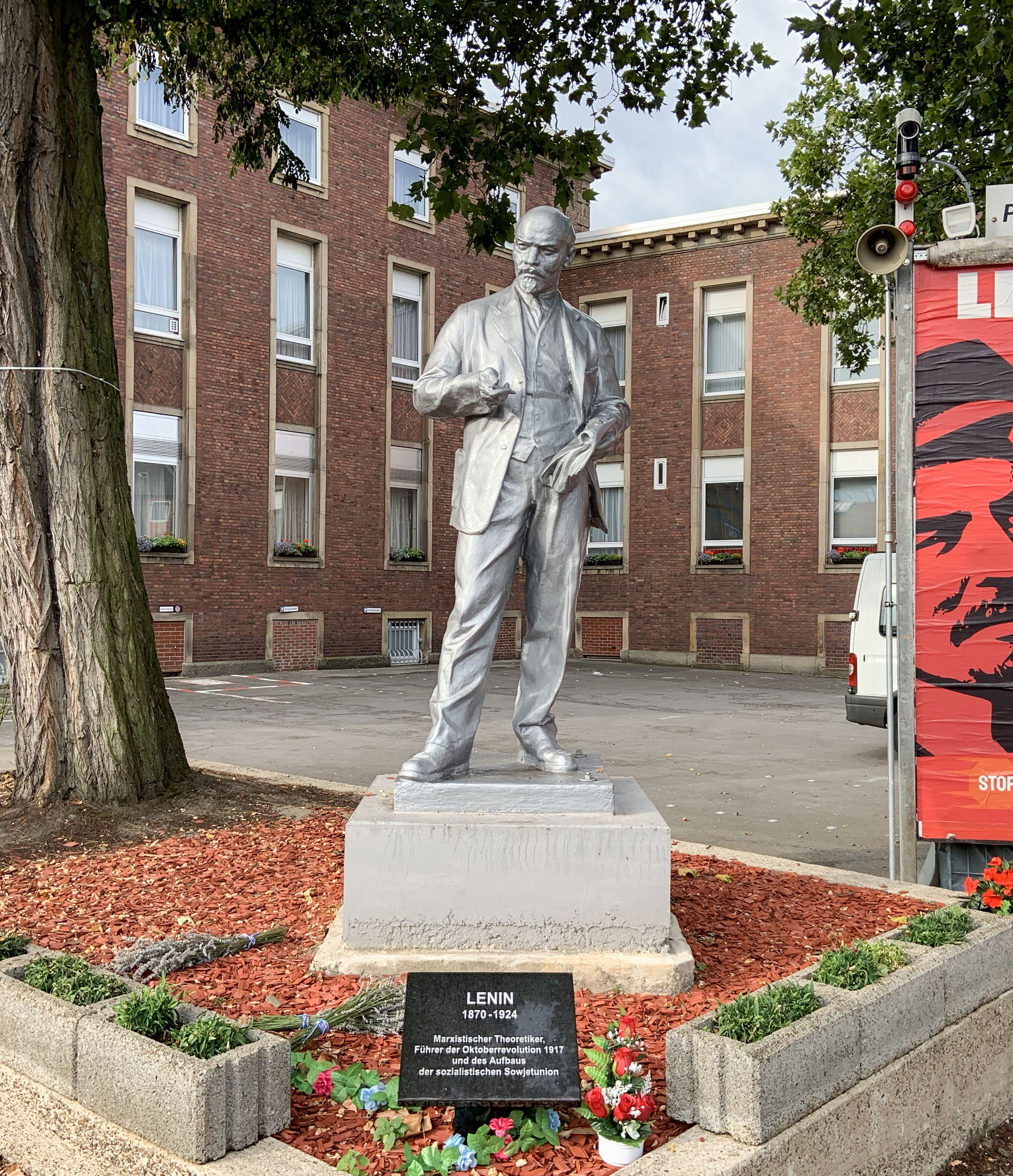
Erected in 2020 outside HQ of Marxist–Leninist Party of Germany, Gelsenkirchen

- **Berlin** – Lenin Monument, created in 1970 by Nikolai Tomsky in granite, 19 m, at Leninplatz, removed in 1992 and buried outside Berlin. The statue's head was found in 2015 and restored and put on display as part of an exhibition on Berlin's monuments in Spandau Citadel, Berlin.
  - One statue of Lenin (approximately 2:1) stood in Kreuzberg (West Berlin) in the yard of a removal company, before being moved to the front of the company's new main building in the district of Neukölln (also West Berlin) in September 2016.
- **Gelsenkirchen** – A 3-metre statue revealed in 2020, The 1st to ever be erected in West Germany. In 2022, a statue of Karl Marx was installed next to it.
- **Nohra** – restored stone statue at the site of the former Soviet airbase.
- **Potsdam** – Bust of Lenin, originally at a Soviet Army base, it was placed in the Volkspark for an exhibition in 1994 and was subsequently moved to one of the main entrances where it is used as a children's climbing feature.
- **Riesa** – Statue of Lenin moved from former Lenin Square in 1991 into a park nearby Soviet war graves. Renovated in 2022.
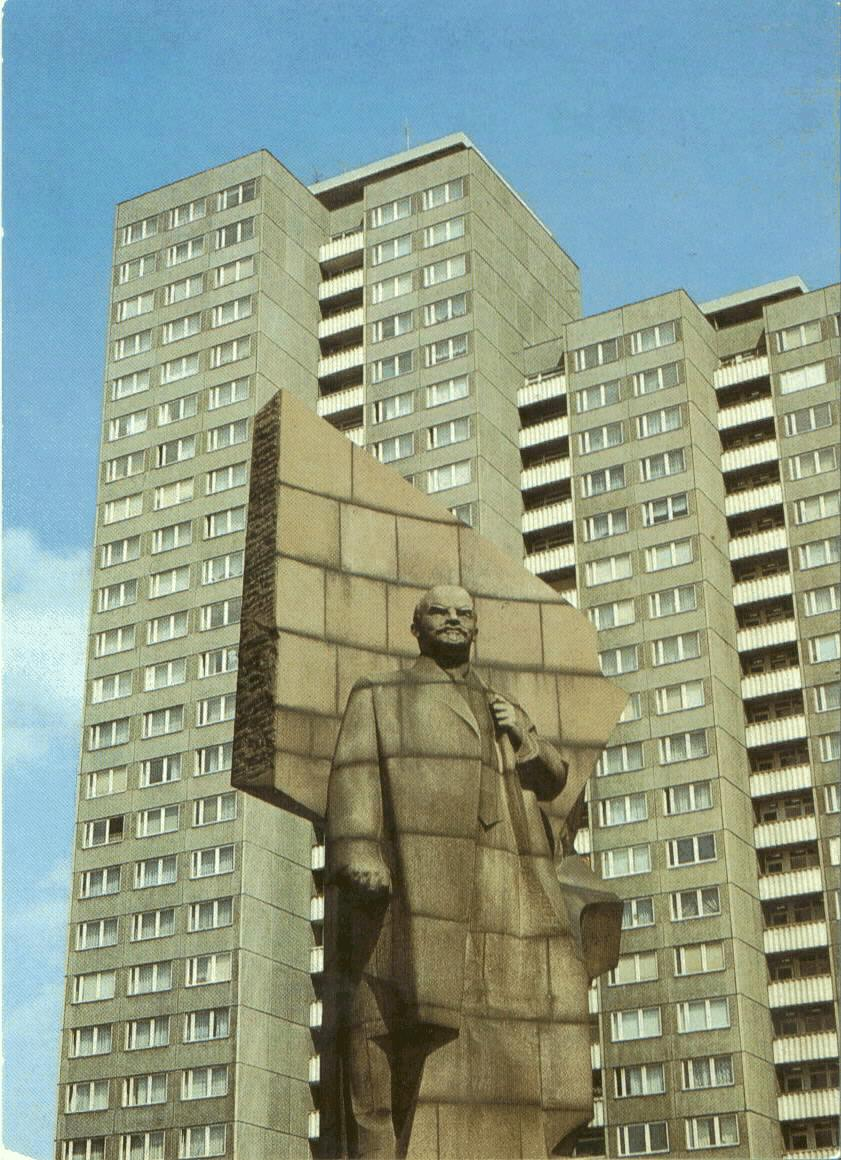
  Leninplatz, East Berlin, Germany (removed in 1992)
- **Schwerin** – Statue of Lenin, made by the Estonian sculptor Jaak Soans and inaugurated on June 22, 1985. Even nowadays this monument is still causing heated debates among politicians, citizens and historians, who, divided in supporters and detractors, continue arguing about its future.
- **Wittstock** – a neglected statue outside the derelict cultural centre at the abandoned Soviet military base.
- **Wünsdorf (Zossen)** – two large statues and a bronze head of Lenin survive at the former Soviet army complex.
- **Zeithain** – a 2-metre statue at the former Soviet Army training ground.

=== Greece ===
- **Athens** – front of the Headquarters building of the Communist Party of Greece. Author Memos Makris. Erected in 1986.

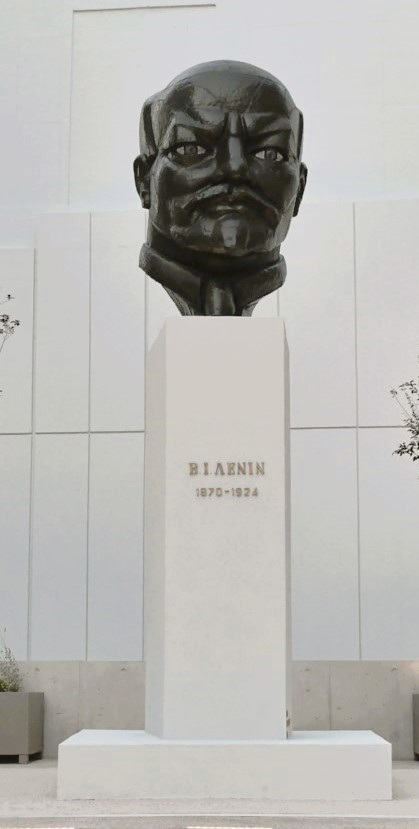
Bust of Vladimir Lenin in CPG Headquarters in Perissos, Athens

=== Hungary ===
- **Budapest** – created in 1965 by Pál Pátzay, in City Park. In 1989, the huge statue was lifted off its red granite pedestal (later demolished), and carried away "for restoration"; in 1991, it was moved to Memento Park. Until 2021 Timewheel was standing on the former site.
- Before 1990, every county seat and industrial town had their Lenin statues. Many smaller settlements had their own, too. In 1990 or shortly afterwards, all Lenins were quickly removed.

=== Italy ===
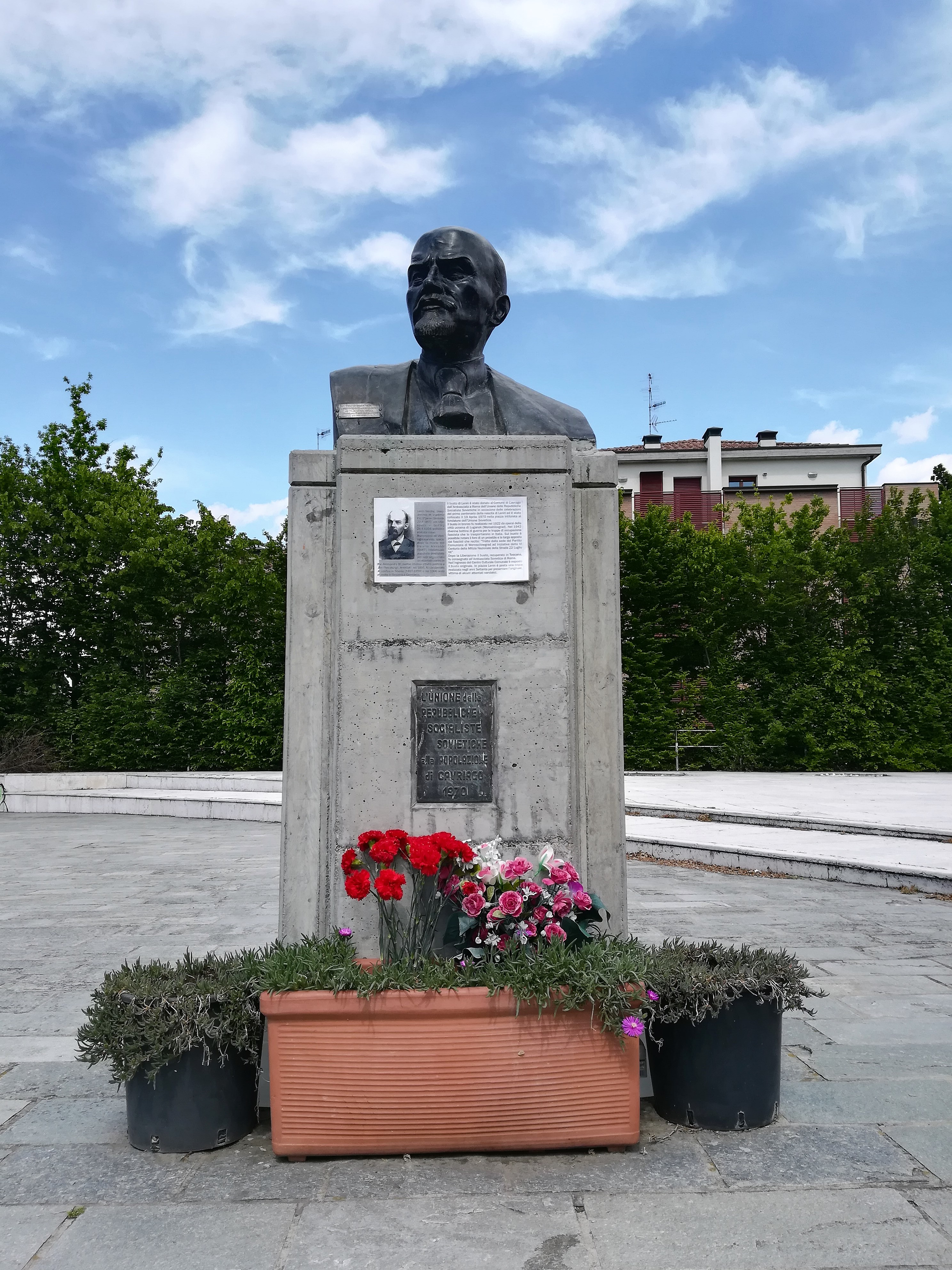
Lenin's bust in Cavriago, Italy

- Cavriago – at Piazza Lenin (Italian for Lenin Square), near Reggio Emilia
- Capri – in the Gardens of Augustus

=== Latvia ===
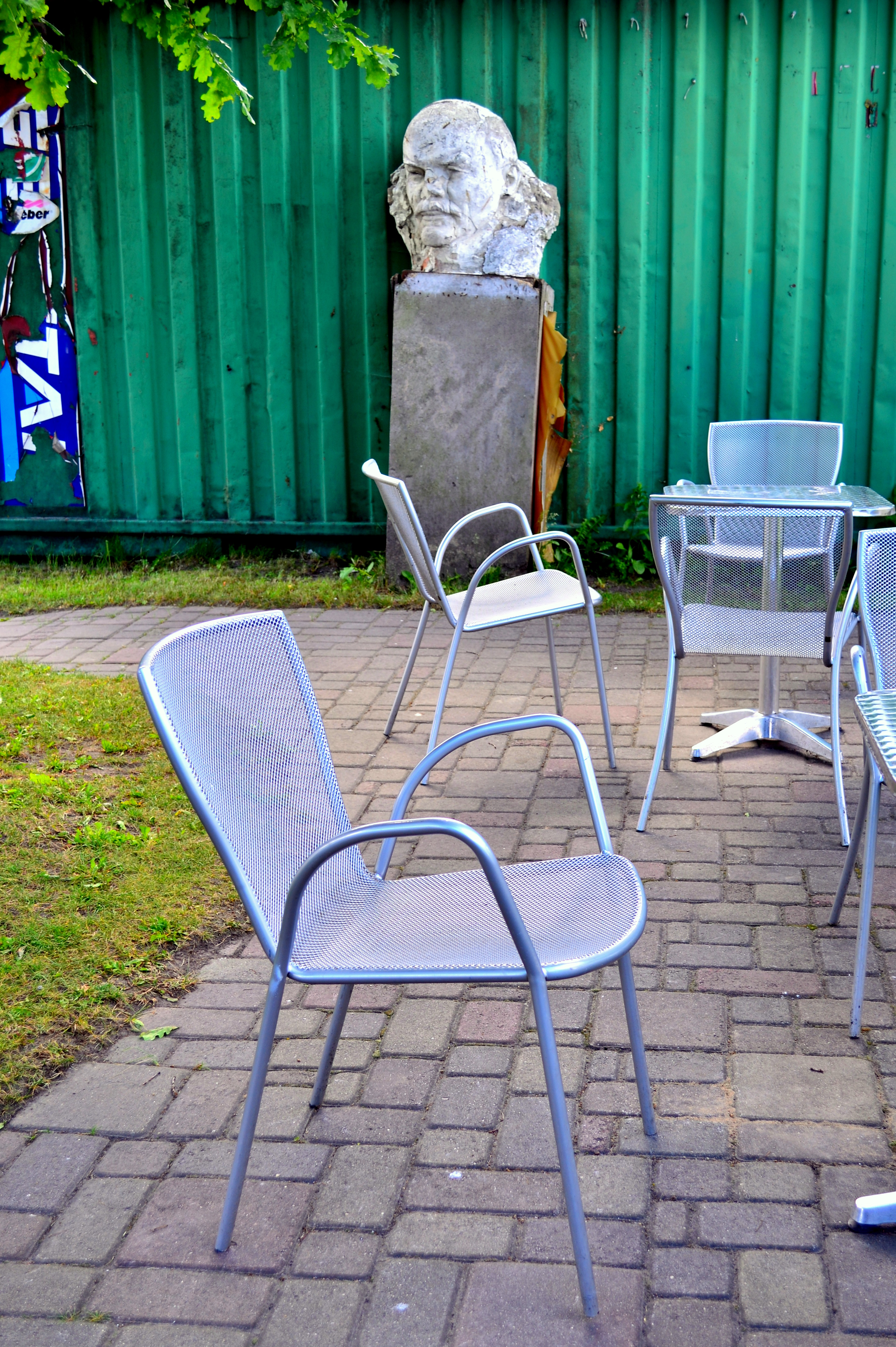
Lenin's head in Jelgava, Latvia (2013)

- Cēsis – statue unveiled on November 7, 1959, sculptor Karlis Jansons; removed on October 17, 1990
- **Riga** – removed on August 25, 1991.

=== Lithuania ===
All statues were taken down in 1991 or soon after, most eventually winding up in Grutas Park. They were erected during the Soviet period and stood, among other places, in Vilnius (at least two statues, one of them together with Lithuanian communist leader Kapsukas), Kaunas, Klaipėda, Šiauliai, Jonava, Druskininkai, and Jurbarkas (the Jurbarkas Lenin is now part of an installation in Europos Parkas park in Vilnius).

- Druskininkai – 1981–1991, sculptor N. Petrulis
- Jonava – 1984–1991, sculptor K. Bogdanas
- Kaunas – 1970–1991, sculptor N. Petrulis
- Klaipėda – 1976–1991, sculptor G. Jokubonis
- Palanga – 1977–1991, sculptor Yevgeny Vuchetich
- Panevėžys – 1983–1991, sculptor G. Jokubonis
- Šiauliai – 1970–1991, sculptors A. Toleikis and D. Lukosevicius
- **Vilnius**
  - 1952–1991, sculptor Nikolai Tomsky
  - 1979–1991, "Lenin and Kapsukas in Poronino", sculptor K. Bogdanas

=== Moldova ===
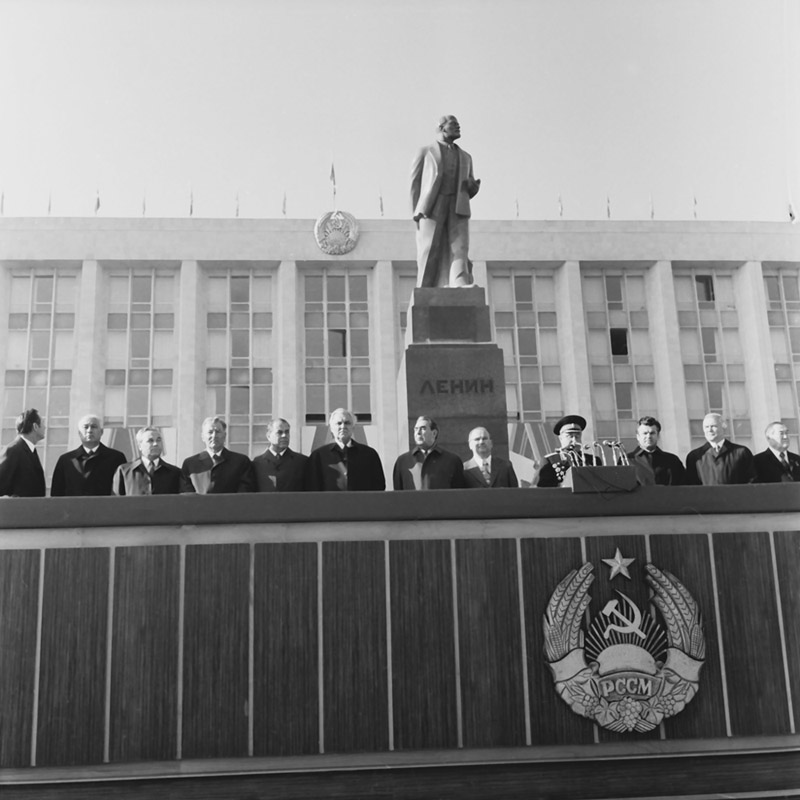
The statue behind a podium during a ceremony in 1976 in Chișinău (then Kishinev)

- **Chișinău** – at the Moldexpo site
- Edineț – Inside the city park
- In the centre (statue) and on the outskirts (bust, near Rompetrol gas station) of Comrat, in the autonomous region of Gagauzia
- Transnistria
  - **Tiraspol** – outside the Parliament, the City Soviet building and the Historical Museum
  - Rîbnița – main square
  - Bender – opposite the Gorky Cinema & on Moskovskaya Street
  - Parcani – on Gogol Street
  - Dnestrovsc – Two busts
  - Various other towns and villages in Transnistria have Lenin busts and statues in their centres

=== Netherlands ===
- Enschede – in front of the TwentseWelle Museum. It was placed in the context of an exhibition about the GDR.
- Zuidbroek – originally in front of a burnt down warehouse in the middle of nowhere. Moved to the village of Tjuchem in late 2023, where it stands at the village's entrance.

=== Norway ===
- Svalbard – two Russian settlements in Svalbard have Lenin statues, Barentsburg and Pyramiden

=== Poland ===
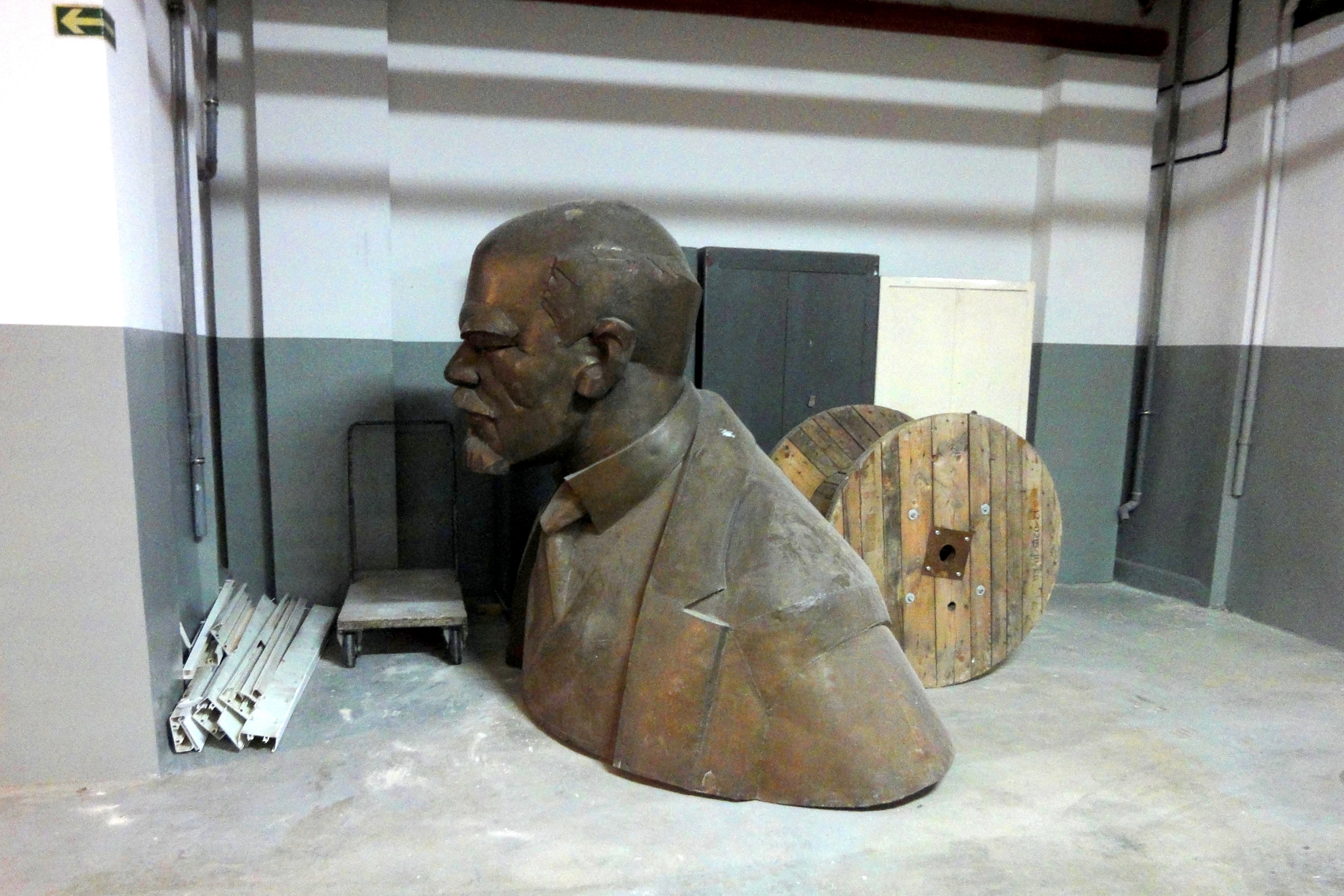
Statue in the basement of the Polish United Workers' Party's House in Warsaw, 2011

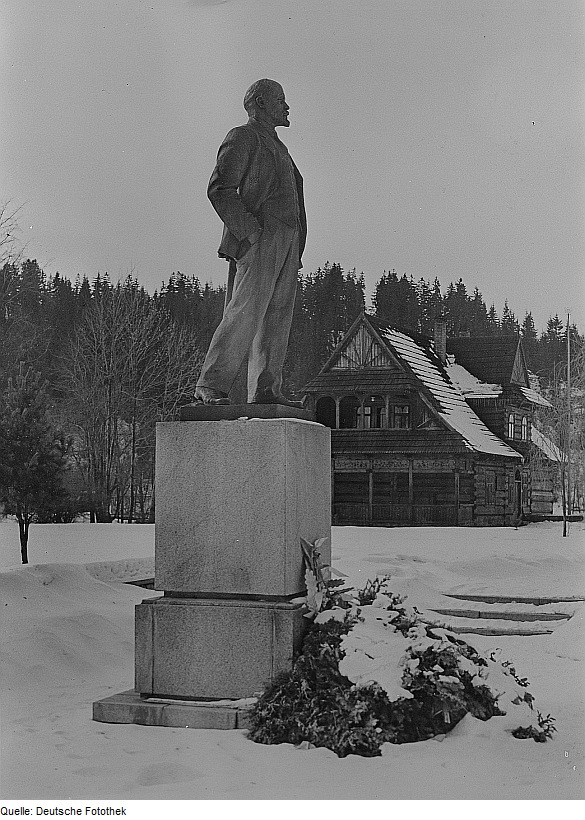
Statue in Poronin, near Lenin's Museum, 1960s

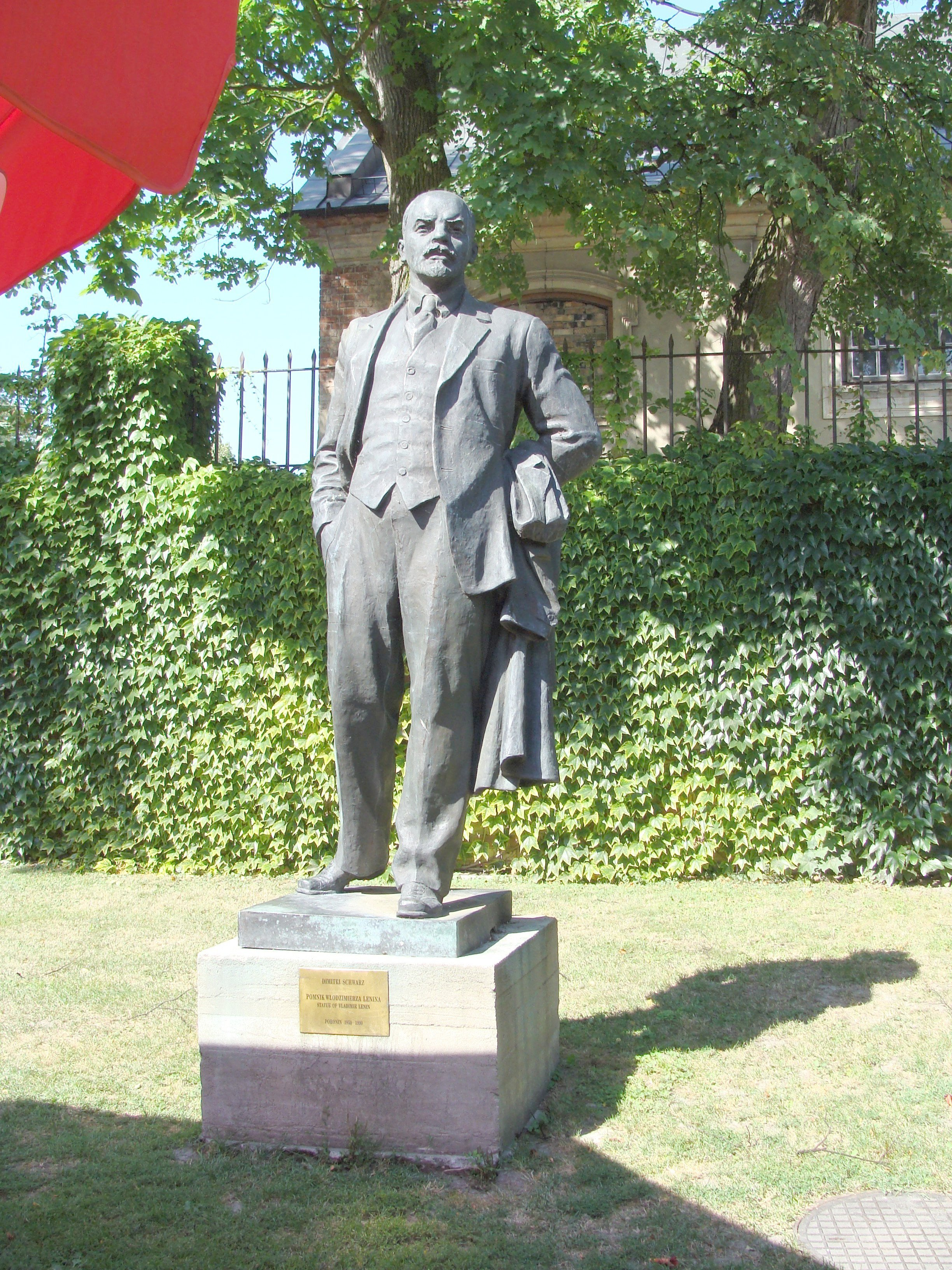
Statue in the museum in Kozłówka, moved from Poronin, 2008

- Warsaw – at the Party's House, used in the Palace of Culture and Science during the Congress of the Polish United Workers' Party; in 2014 moved to the museum in Kozłówka
- Kraków – in Nowa Huta district, the biggest in Poland, pulled down in December 1989, in 1992 moved to High Chaparral Theme Park in Sweden
- Kraków – in Nowa Huta district, in the area Vladimir Lenin Steelwork (currently Tadeusz Sendzimir Steelworks), removed in 1990
- Kraków – with Joseph Stalin, in Strzelecki Park, removed in 1957
- Gdańsk – in Gdańsk Shipyard (ex Lenin Shipyard), hid in 1990, destroyed in 1991, in 1999 made a copy in the museum of "Solidarity" in Gdańsk Shipyard
- Poronin – pulled down in 1990, since 1999 in the museum in Kozłówka
- Poronin – set up in 2014 on private area, damaged in 2015
- Słubice – removed in 1990
- Mysłowice – in Wesoła district, in the area Coal Mine "Lenin" (currently Coal Mine "Wesoła"), pulled down in 1990
- Legnica – ex-headquarters of the Northern Group of Forces of the Soviet Army, moved to Ulyanovsk in 1993
- Legnica – at Legnica Airport, ex military unit of the Soviet Army, removed in 1992
- Legnica – in Zosinek district, ex military unit of the Soviet Army, damaged in 1992
- Legnica – in Legnicki Dwór district, ex military unit of the Soviet Army, removed in 1992
- Borne Sulinowo – ex military unit of the Soviet Army, removed in 1992
- Borne Sulinowo – ex military unit of the Soviet Army, removed in 1992
- Brzeg – ex military unit of the Soviet Army, removed in 1992
- Brzeg – ex school in military unit of the Soviet Army, removed in 1991
- Stargard – in Kluczewo district, ex military unit of the Soviet Army, removed ca. 1992
- Kołobrzeg – in Podczele district, leisure centre "Bukowina", head separately, damaged after 1992, before in military unit of the Soviet Army
- Oława – ex military unit of the Soviet Army, removed in 1992
- Swoboda – set up in 1954 in front of the school, moved after 1990 to building ex school
- Poznań – in club and café Proletaryat, set up in 2004
- Maczków – on the balcony of a private building

In 1939–1941, after the attack of the Red Army, statues of Lenin were in: Sokółka, Augustów, Kolno, Suwałki, Białystok (pulled down in June 1941), Łomża, Choroszcz (3x), Brańsk, Bielsk Podlaski, Jedwabne, Siemiatycze, Śniadowo, Czyżewo (pulled down July 5, 1941), Zaręby Kościelne, Zambrów, Przemyśl, Lubaczów, Łapy, Zabłudów etc.

=== Romania ===
- **Bucharest** – designed by sculptor Boris Caragea and built in front of the House of the Free Press in April 1960, it was pulled down in March 1990

=== Russia ===
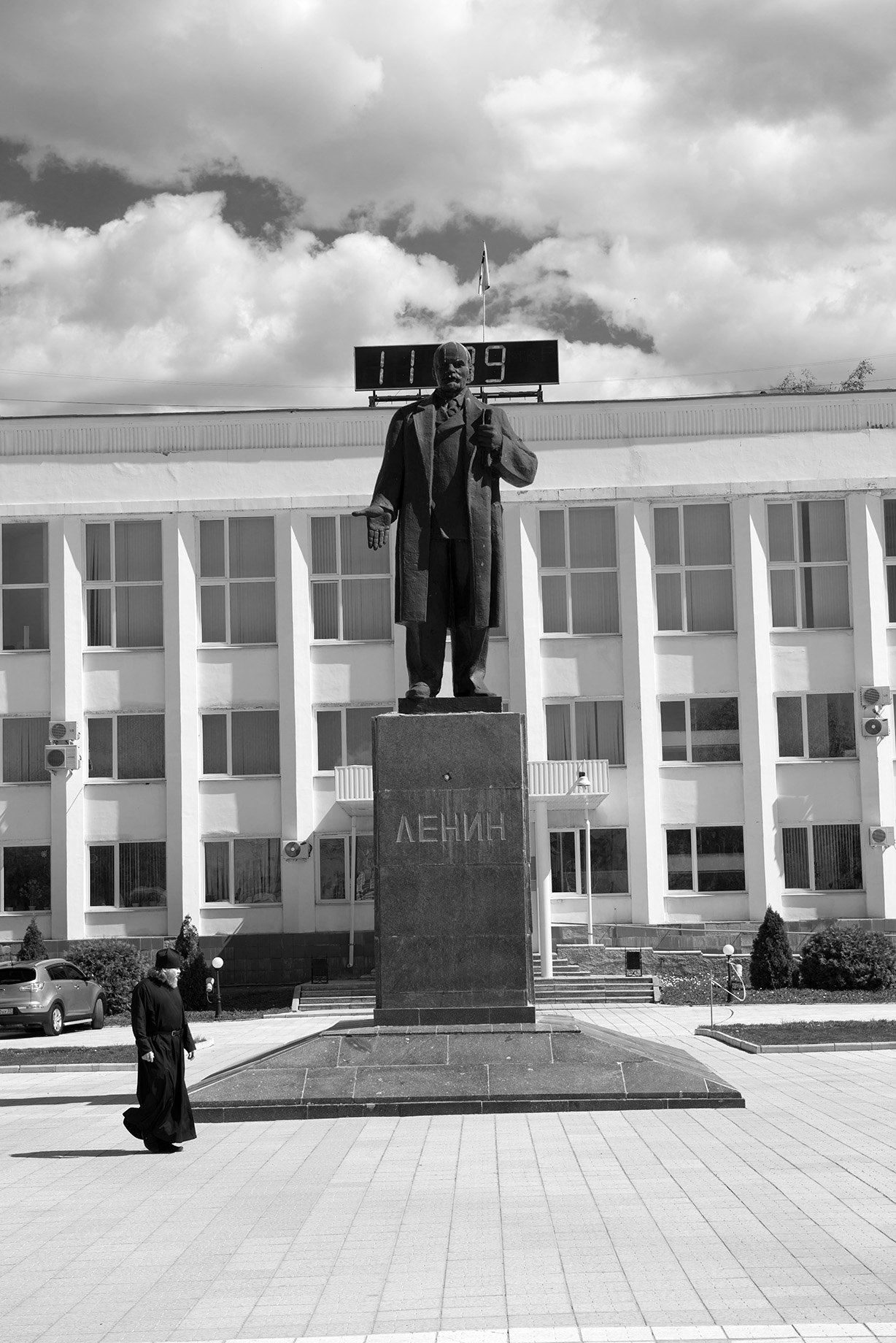
Statue of Lenin in Murom

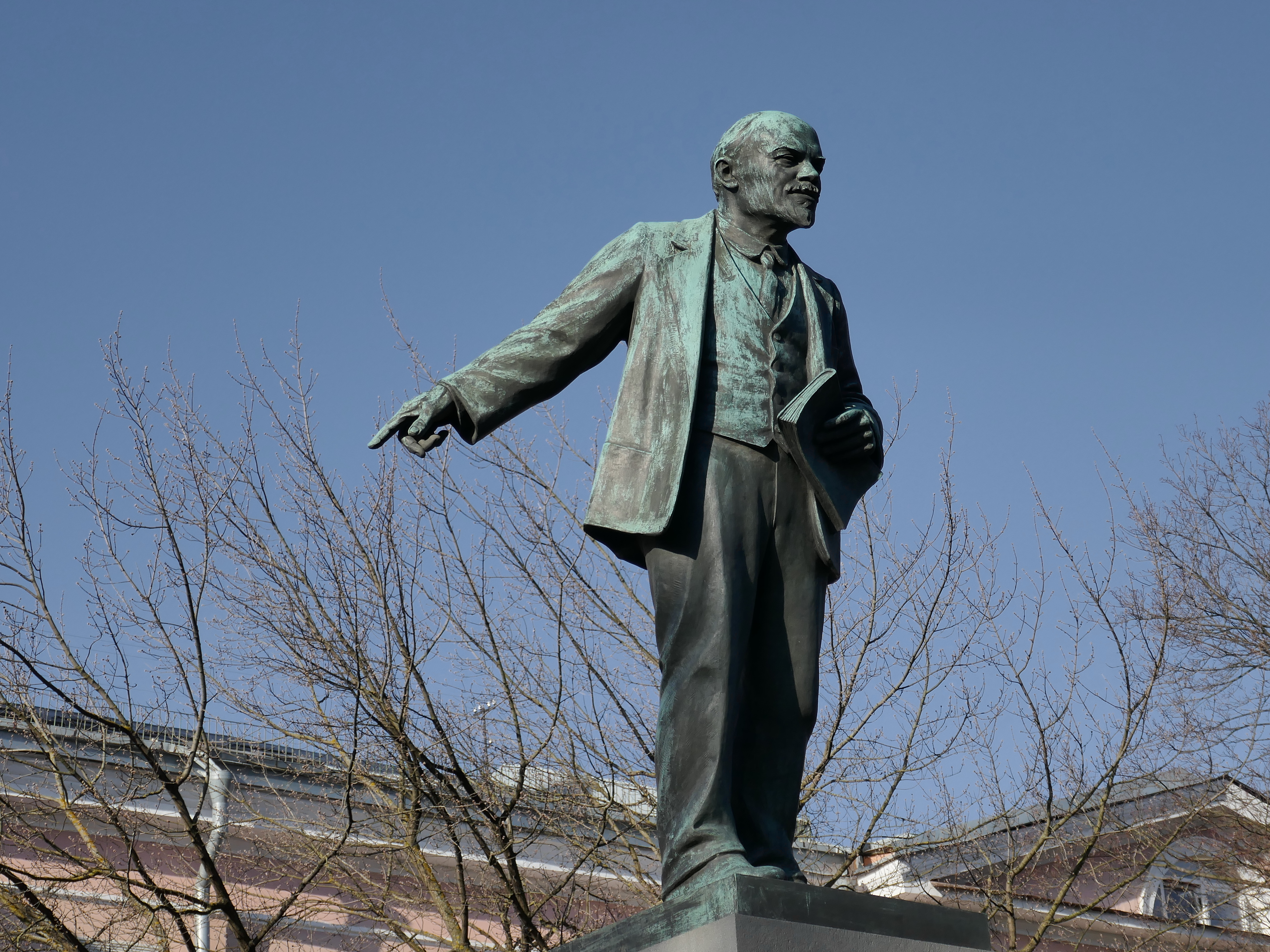
Statue of Lenin in Saint Petersburg

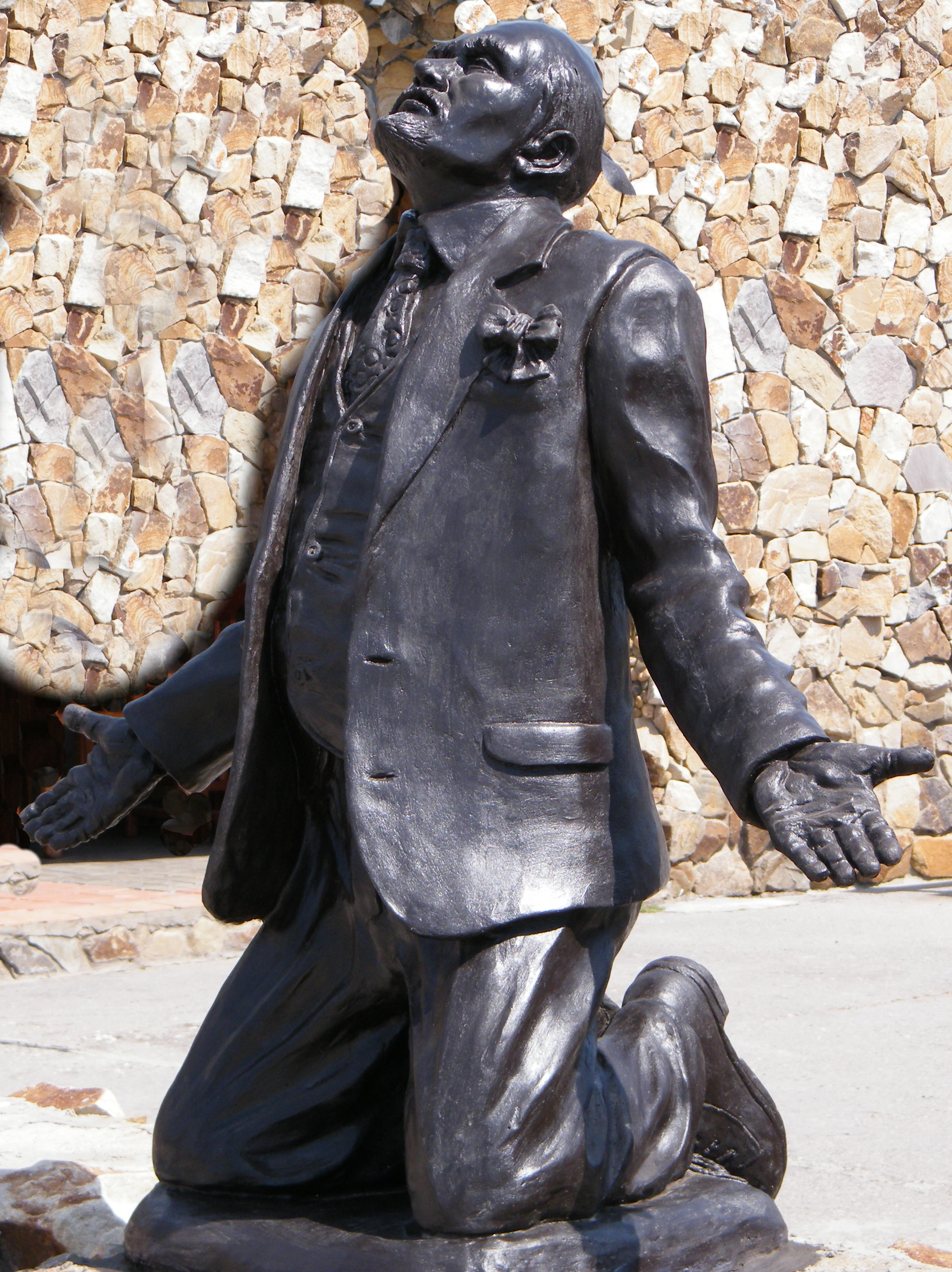
Памятник В.И.Ленину на коленях авторская скульптура для композиции "Страшный суд", в Волгоградской области. V.I. Lenin on his knees

Out of 7,000 Lenin statues as of 1991, Russia retained the vast majority. As of 2022, there are approximately 6,000 monuments to Lenin in Russia.

- Akhtubinsk – a monument installed in the town center, V.I. Lenin Square
- Almetyevsk – a monument installed in the center of the city on Lenin Square
- Arzamas – two monuments in the city, in the Cathedral Square and Peace Square
- Arkhangelsk – A monument on the central square is the last major Lenin monument to be erected in the Soviet Union, in 1988. Others stand in Solombala on the Square, Terekhina on the street, and Gagarin in the yard.
- Astrakhan – monument installed in the square, V.I. Lenin Square
- Bakhchysarai (disputed Crimea)
- Balakovo – Saratov region, two monuments
- Barnaul – three on the main avenue, and one in Upland Park. Because of the drapery which is present in the composition of the monument near the street Anatolia, a Lonely Planet guide to Russia has called the monument "Lenin Toreador".
- Belgorod – at Cathedral Square (Soviet-era Revolution Square), in Lenin Park, near the now-current cinema "Falcon", and a bust in the Belgorod Dairy Plant (BMP)
- Berezniki – Lenin Square (about Palace of Culture, Lenin)
- Bogoroditsk – town center
- Boksitogorsk – central square (Lenin Square)
- Dubna – 25 m, the second tallest; 15 m statue on a 10 m pedestal
- Dedovsk – a small monument is located opposite the branch of RSCU in the street of Gagarin
- Dimitrovgrad – the town square – the square of the Soviets. A bust is located within the NCC, Slavsky.
- Dmitry – installed in the central square of the historic district
- Dubna – the world's second largest statue of Lenin lies in the vicinity of the "Big Volga". Sculptor S.D. Merkurov, height 25 m (with pedestal 37 m), weight 540 tons. The monument was erected in 1937 on the banks of the Volga near the beginning of the Moscow Canal. On the other bank was a monument to Stalin. After Stalin's death, the monument was blown up in 1961, but the pedestal remained.
- Dudinka – monument in front of the House of Culture
- Dyatkovo – on Lenin Square in the town center, next to buildings authorities
- Dzerzhinsk – in Lenin Square. The authors of the improvement and development area are the architects Androsova GD and Sinyavsky EA. Sculptor Nelyubin BS; opened for the 100th anniversary of Vladimir Lenin in 1970.
- Ekaterinburg – main monument in front of City Hall in Lenin Square and the Square of 1905; secondary monuments placed at the entrance of the Sverdlovsk Tools Factory Street
- Gelendzhik – monument near the boarding house "Caucasus", st. Mayachnaya
  - The working village Settlement on Lenin Street has a monument, built in contemporary Russia (established November 7,
  - 2006). Sculptor V. Fetisov
- Irkutsk
  - monument at the crossing of streets Karl Marx and Lenin
  - bust on Karl Marx street, in front of a shopping center
- Izhevsk – monument established in 1958 at the National Library of the Udmurt Republic, sculptor PP Yatsynova and architect LN Kulaga, in bronze and granite
- Ishimbay – 1966, the square on the street gutter
- Kazan
  - Lenin Monument on the Freedom Square, statue with bleachers installed in 1954 at the Freedom Square
  - Monument to student Volodya Ulyanov, monument to young Vladimir Ulyanov on the Kremlyovskaya Street
  - Lenin monument on the May 1st Street
- Kaliningrad – major monument to Lenin by the sculptor VB Topuridze installed at Victory Square in 1958. In 2005, during the reconstruction of the area, the monument was removed allegedly temporarily, for the restoration, but after the reconstruction the monument was not returned. Mayor of Kaliningrad Yury Savenko put forward the idea of creating the city's Lenin Square, where he could transfer the monument.
- Kaluga – statue in front of the regional administration in the area of old trades that previously had the name Lenin
- Kamensk Shakhtinsky – a monument to Lenin in Kamensk Shakhtinsky square, at the intersection of the Avenue of Karl Marx and Pushkin Street, next to the district council Kamensky district, Rostov region
- Kemerovo – Lenin monument in the Square of the Soviets. One night in 1993 local businessmen made an unsuccessful attempt to demolish the monument.
- Prokopyevsk – statue was destroyed by a drunk man attempting to take a selfie
- Kimry – a monument placed in the town center
- Kirov – Theatre Square, XX Party Congress
- Kolomna – monument installed in the center of the square of the two revolutions
- Krasnodar

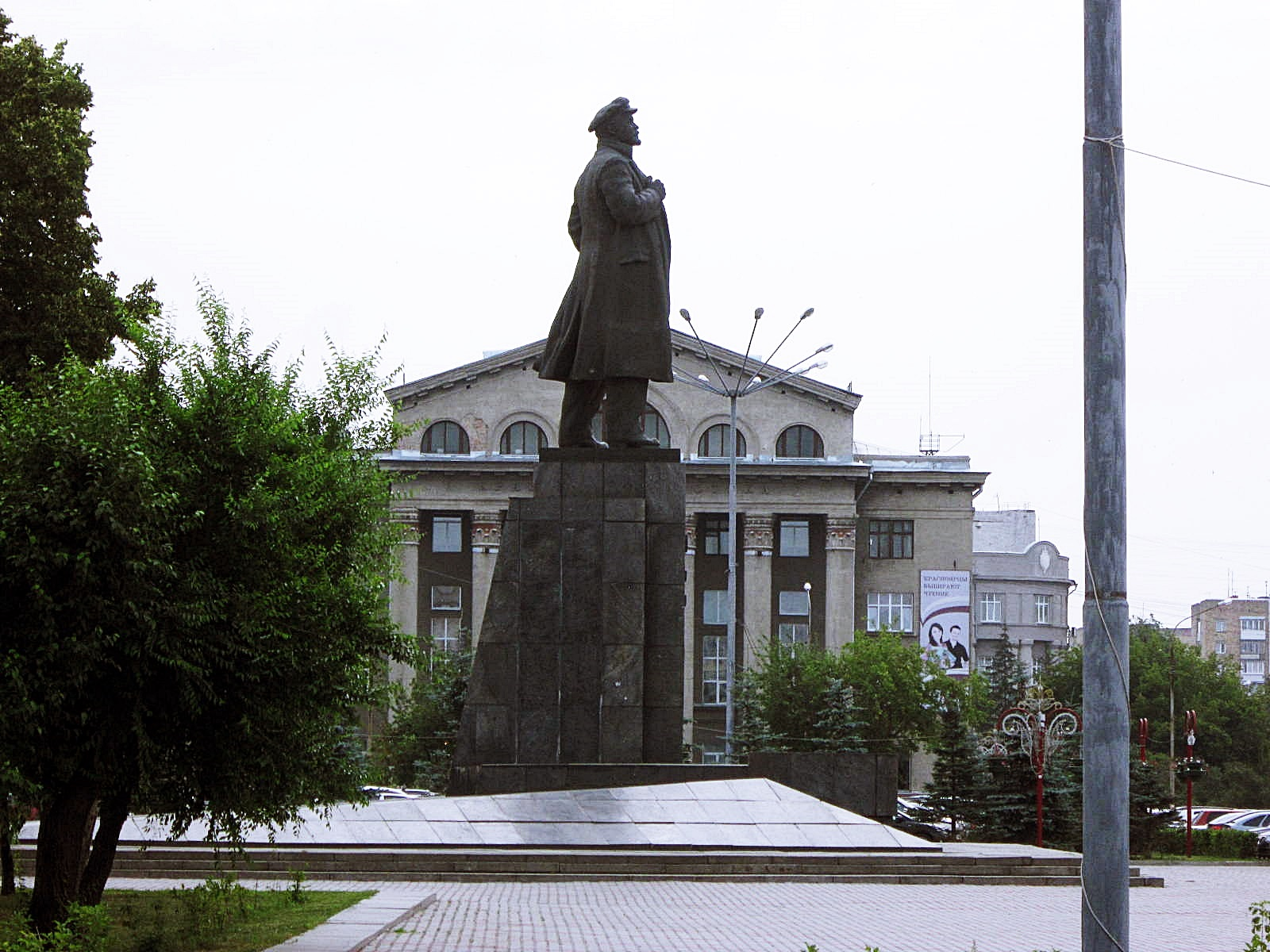
Revolution Square Krasnoyarsk

  - The main urban monument to Lenin, sculptor P. Sabsay, architect A Giants, opened in 1956 on the square in front of the Communist Party Regional Committee (now the Legislative Assembly of Krasnodar Region – KYC), according to government decree of the RSFSR.
  - The oldest statue of Lenin in Krasnodar (sculptor K. Dietrich) is in the park to VI Lenin, on the street Vishnyakova. The monument was built in 1925, a year after the death of the Soviet leader.
- Krasnoturinsk – monument installed in front of the city administration in the city centre
- Krasnoyarsk – statue on Revolution Square in the city centre
- Krasnoznamensk (Moscow region) – set before the House of Culture (house of the garrison officers)
- Kursk – monument installed in front of the city administration in the city centre
- Lodeynoye Pole – Statue in front of train station
- **Moscow** – There are over 82 Lenin monuments in Moscow, including:
  - Lenin Monument in the Kaluga Square, large standing statue in downtown Kaluga Square, opposite the Ministry of Internal Affairs and the Ministry of Justice
  - Lenin monument at VDNKh, standing statue at the All-Russian Exhibition Center
  - Monument to Lenin on Tverskaya Square, sitting statue on Tverskaya Square, opposite the Residence of the Mayor of Moscow
  - Lenin Monument in the Park of the December Uprising, a sitting statue of Lenin
  - Monument to Lenin in Luzhniki, standing statue in front of the Luzhniki Stadium
  - Lenin Monument on Pavlovskaya Street, standing statue with a cap, on the place of Fanny Kaplan's failed assassination attempt.
- Noginsk – One of the first Lenin monuments in 1924
- Murom
- Omsk – statue on Lenin Street and bust on Bohdan Khmelnytsky Street
- Pokhvistnevo – statue is standing near the Culture Palace
- Pospelikha, Altai Krai – statue is standing near Pospelikhinskaya Makaronnaya Fabrika on Sovetskaya Street. It is notably similar to the statue of Lenin on Burakova Street in Moscow.
- Pskov – statue is standing near the House of Soviets
- Saint-Petersburg
  - Statue of Lenin at Finland Station, Lenin giving a speech from an armored car monument on the Lenin Square next to the Finland Railway Station
  - Lenin Monument on the Moscow Square, a standing statue on the Moscow Square
  - Lenin Monument at Smolny, standing statue in front of the Smolny Institute
  - Lenin Monument at the Nevsky Plant, standing statue in front of the Nevsky Plant (Nevskiy Zavod)
- Samara – Statue of Lenin on Ploshchad Revolyutsii (Revolution Square) in the old part of the city.
- Sevastopol (disputed Crimea)
- **Simferopol** (capital of disputed Crimea)
- Tambov – Lenin statue in Lenin Square, in the centre of the city.
- Tyumen – statue in Central Square
- Ulan Ude – biggest head of Lenin in the world, in front of Buryatia government building
- Veliky Novgorod – two monuments: in the Sofia area (established in April 1928, lost by war, restored in 1958) and in Street Trading Ivanskoy side
- Vladikavkaz (sculptor ZI Azgur, architect G. Zakharov) is open on Lenin Square in front of the Russian Drama Theatre. Vakhtangov in 1957. In 1993, twice blown up and subsequently restored.
- Volgograd (the supposedly tallest statue, with a height of 27 meters).now in five sites:
  - "Great Lenin" – Liberty Square (the intersection of Victory Avenue and the streets of the World)
  - "Little Lenin" – the Children's park named after Alexander Pushkin.
  - A monument in the main building of the Volgograd State Technical University.
  - 2 monuments in car-repair factory.
  - Lenin monument at the entrance of the Volga-Don channel – set in the Krasnoarmeysk area (height pedestal) – 30 meters, the sculpture – 27 meters. Sculptor – EV Vucetich. Earlier, on the same pedestal, there was a monument to Stalin.
  - In the central region on Lenin Square on the 90th anniversary of the monument to Lenin. Sculptor – EV Vucetich.
  - In the central region, in the park opposite the building of regional administration.
  - The Post Office building is a statue of Lenin.
  - V.I. Lenin on his knees
- Volga:
  - Monument to Lenin Square.
- Vyborg:
  - A monument in the town square – Red (set in 1957)
  - The bust in the house-museum of Lenin
- Yakutsk – Lenin statue in Lenin Square, in the centre of the city.
- Yalta (disputed Crimea)
- Yefremov – a park near the city administration. Also in the park near the police building.
- Zheleznogorsk (Krasnoyarsk region) – Lenin Square opposite the Palace of Culture. There was also the now dismantled joint statue of Lenin and Stalin.

=== Slovakia ===
- Bratislava – Built in 1970, after Velvet Revolution it was taken to Nové Mesto nad Váhom. The statue is now privately owned and it is located in the village Drietoma.
- Poprad – Built in 1981 (see Statue of Lenin, Seattle)
- Košice – Built in 1987, the statue stood in front of former Building of Communist Party of Czechoslovakia, in 1989 after Velvet Revolution it was taken to the warehouse of the East Slovak Museum.

=== Spain ===
- Bust at Otxarkoaga district of Bilbao, erected without approval from the authorities.

=== Sweden ===
- Vittsjö, a small town in southern Sweden. The statue is privately owned by Calevi Hämäläinen.

=== United Kingdom ===
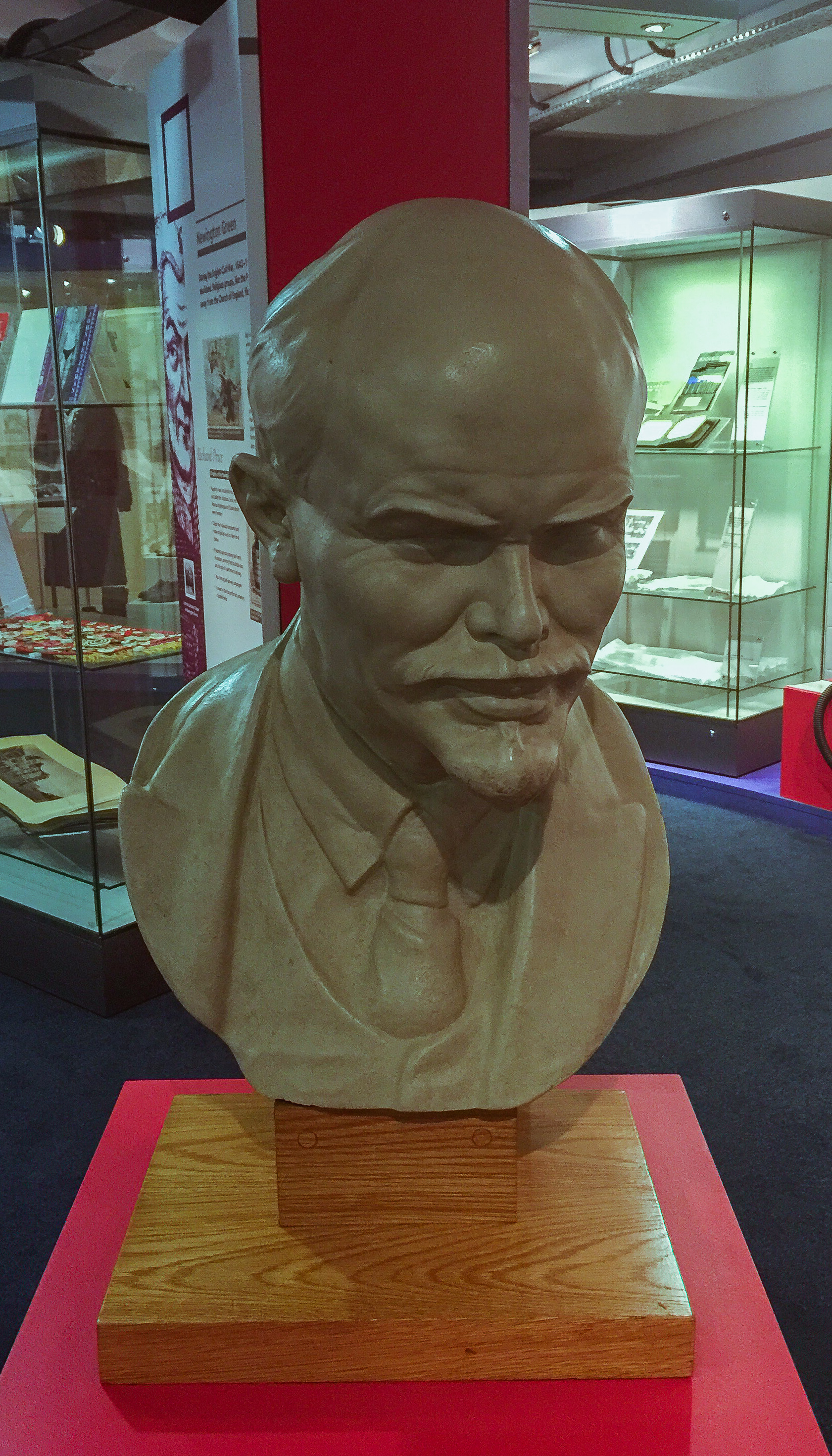
The bust of Lenin by Lubetkin, displayed in Islington Museum

- **London**, Islington Museum – 245 St John Street, Islington. Bust by Berthold Lubetkin commissioned by the UK Government during the war in tribute to the efforts of the Soviet Union. It was placed in Holford Square (briefly Lenin's home when he lived in London) and unveiled in 1942. It was a supposed focal point of a new housing development to be named 'Lenin Court' although the choice of Lenin proved unpopular with the local community and the bust was frequently daubed with anti-communist slogans. Lubetkin had the bust removed and when the housing development was completed in the late 1940s, it was renamed 'Bevin Court'. The bust was displayed in Islington Town Hall for many years and is now on permanent display in the museum.
- Royal Air Force Museum Midlands – In the national cold War exhibition. A Statue of Lenin holding a gift bag is used as a focal point for the museum's gift shop.
- Belfast – The Kremlin Bar, a gay bar, has a statue of Lenin welcoming partygoers over the main entrance.
- Thenford House sculpture garden, has a bronze head of Lenin by Dzintra Jansone which originally was placed atop the KGB building in the town of Preiļi in Latvia.

=== Ukraine ===
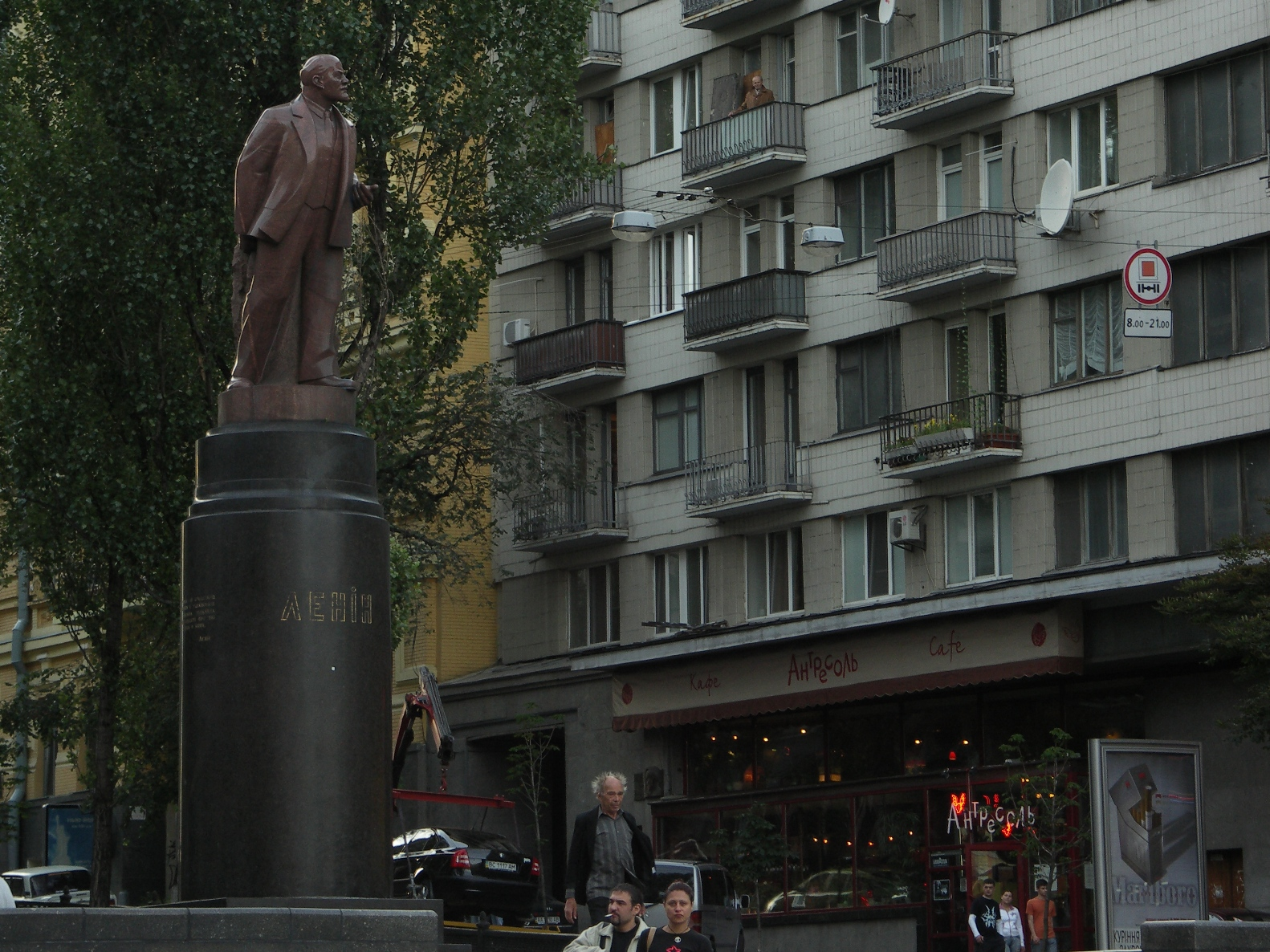
Kyiv, Ukraine. The Lenin statue was toppled and dismantled on December 8, 2013, during the Euromaidan

In 1991 Ukraine had 5,500 Lenin monuments.

Before Ukraine's Euromaidan, Lenin monuments and other Soviet-era monuments were already being removed. However, in 2008, the 139th anniversary of Lenin, two new Lenin monuments were erected in Luhansk Oblast (now occupied by Russia).

Following the 2014 Revolution of Dignity in Ukraine, more than 500 statues of Lenin were dismantled between February 2014 and April 2015, after which nearly 1,700 remained standing. On May 15, 2015, President of Ukraine Petro Poroshenko signed a bill into law that set a six-month deadline for the removal of the country's communist monuments. By December 2015, 1,300 Lenin monuments were still standing (in Ukraine).

In April 2015, a formal decommunization process started in Ukraine after laws were approved which, among other acts, outlawed communist symbols.

During the Russian invasion of Ukraine, many of these statues of Lenin, which had been taken down by Ukrainian activists, were re-erected by occupying Russian forces and Ukrainian collaborators in Russian-controlled areas.

- Almazna (occupied by Russia)
- Alupka (disputed Crimea)
- Andriievo-Ivanove – broken in half on January 4, 2014
- Amvrosiivka (occupied by Russia)
- Antratsyt (occupied by Russia)
- Armiansk (disputed Crimea)
- Bakhchysarai (disputed Crimea)
- Baranivka
- Barvinkove
- Berdychiv
- Bila Tserkva
- Bilopillia
- Bilohirsk (disputed Crimea)
- Bilokurakyne – fell on October 10, 2014
- Bilozerka – removed on July 8, 2014
- Bilytske
- Bohodukhiv – toppled on October 10, 2014
- Boryslav – removed in 1990
- Brianka (occupied by Russia)
- Brovary
- Bunhe (occupied by Russia)
- Chasiv Yar
- Cherkasy – mounted from 1969 to 2008, designed by K.O. Kuznetsov, architect – V.G. Gniezdilo
- Chernobyl main street
- Chernihiv – toppled by protesters on February 21, 2014.
- Chernivtsi – mounted from 1951 to 1992, designed by М.K. Vronsky, O.P. Oliynyk, architect — М. Ashkinazi
- Chervona Svoboda – removed on July 8, 2014
- Chuhuiv
- Derazhnia
- Derhachi – toppled on September 29, 2014
- Dnipro – toppled by protesters on February 21, 2014.
- Dnipro, 2 Lenin monuments were removed by the city in 2014; in March 2014 the city's Lenin Square was renamed "Heroes of Independence Square" in honor of the people killed during Euromaidan. The statue of Lenin on the square was removed. In June 2014 another Lenin monument was removed (parts of the monument were moved to a local history museum) and replaced by a monument for the Ukrainian military fighting against armed insurgents in the Donbas (region of Ukraine)

In May 2016 Dnipropetrovsk was itself officially renamed to Dnipro to comply with decommunization laws.

- Dokuchaievsk (occupied by Russia)
- Donetsk (occupied by pro Russian separatists) – in the Lenin Square
- Dovzhansk (occupied by Russia)
- Dunaivtsi
- Dzhankoi (disputed Crimea)
- Enerhodar
- Fastiv
- Feodosia (disputed Crimea)
- Hirnyk
- Hirske
- Inkerman (disputed Crimea)
- Ivano-Frankivsk – mounted from 1975 to 1990, designed by H.N. Kalchenko, А.Е. Belostotsky, О.A. Suprun.
- Izmail
- Kamianka-Dniprovska – destroyed on April 16, 2014
- **Kyiv**, located in front of Besarabsky Market, erected in the 1950s. (Toppled and dismantled by Ukrainian protesters on December 8, 2013)
- Kharkiv: At the Freedom Square, erected in 1964. Toppled by protesters on September 28, 2014. Another statue destroyed on October 6, 2014
- Kharkiv: three monuments to Lenin dismantled by unknown late August 2014. On November 19, 2014, the Kharkiv Administrative Court of appeal upheld the decision of the Kharkiv district administrative court that had dismissed an appeal by the City Council to suspend Baluta's order to dismantle the statue.
- Kherson – toppled on February 22, 2014; restored April 2022
- Khmelnytskyi
- Horishni Plavni
- Kostychany – bust of Lenin decapitated on February 21, 2014
- Podilsk – toppled on December 8, 2013
- Kramatorsk – 3 statues, two of them toppled on April 17, 2015 and April 22, 2015
- Krasnohorivka
- Krasnohrad
- Krasnoperekopsk (disputed Crimea)
- Khrustalnyi (occupied by Russia)
- Kremenchuk – broken on November 25, 2008
- Kreminna
- Kryvyi Rih – toppled between September 1 and 2, 2014
- Kurakhove
- Laha – mounted from 1967 to 1991, designed by O.P. Oliynyk, architect – O. Lanko
- Lion-Gri – mounted from 1967 to 1991, designed by М.K. Vronsky, architect – I. Meknychuk
- Lozova
- Luhansk (occupied by Russia)
- Lviv – mounted from 1952 to 1990, designed by Sergey Merkurov, architect – I.O. Frantsuz
- Mariupol: A statue of Lenin was located at the Lenin Avenue (toppled by unknown August 15, 2014). – painted with Ukrainian national colours
- Marinka
- Miusynsk (occupied by Russia)
- Molochansk
- Molodohvardiisk (occupied by Russia)
- Mospyne (occupied by Russia)
- Nikopol – toppled on October 25, 2014
- Nova Kakhovka – Reinstalled in April 2022 by Russian occupiers
- Novomoskovsk September 2015, toppled by protestors.
- Novovoskresenske – toppled on September 10, 2014
- Novosvitlivka – erected in 2008 on the occasion of the 139th anniversary of Lenin's birthday
- Obukhiv – removed in 2009
- Odesa – mounted in 1967 to 2006, designed by Matvey Manizer, О.М. Manizer, architects: I.Ye. Rozin, Yu.S. Lapin, М.М. Volkov, relocated to the park of Lenin's Komsomol
- Oleksandrivsk (occupied by Russia)
- Orikhiv
- Panchenkove – erected in 2008 on the occasion of the 139th anniversary of Lenin's birthday
- Pavlohrad – toppled on November 17, 2014
- Petrovo-Krasnosillia (occupied by Russia)
- Poltava – toppled by protesters on February 21, 2014.
- Polohy
- Popasna
- Prymorsk
- Pryvillia
- Rodynske
- Rovenky (occupied by Russia)
- Saky (disputed Crimea)
- Selydove
- Sevastopol (disputed Crimea)
- Shcholkine (disputed Crimea)
- **Simferopol** (capital of disputed Crimea)
- Siversk
- Sloviansk – removed on June 3, 2015
- Snizhne (occupied by Russia)
- Soledar
- Starobilsk
- Staryi Krym (disputed Crimea)
- Sudak (disputed Crimea)
- Sukhodilsk (occupied by Russia)
- Sumy – mounted from 1982 to the early 2000s, designed by E. Kuntsevych, architects O. Zavarov and I. Lanko, relocated to the park at the city limits, the Lenin statue outside the House of Culture was removed by the city in 2014 and a statue to Cossack leader Herasym Kondratiev will replace it
- Svatove – toppled on September 30, 2014
- Svitlodarsk (occupied by Russia)
- Teplohirsk (occupied by Russia)
- Ternopil – mounted from 1967 to 1990. It was designed by М.Ye. Roberman, architect – G. Karasiev
- Tokmak
- Ukrainsk
- Uzhhorod – mounted from 1974 to 1991, designed by М.K. Vronsky and O.P. Oliynyk, architects Yu.O. Maksymov and V.O.Sikorsky
- Valky
- Varva
- Vilniansk (occupied by the pro Russian separatists)
- Vinnytsia – mounted from 1972 to 1991, designed by А. Kovalev, V.I. Agibalov, Ya.I. Ryk
- Vovchansk
- Voznesenivka (occupied by Russia)
- Vuhlehirsk (occupied by Russia)
- Yalta (disputed Crimea)
- Zaporizhzhia – disguised in Vyshyvanka on October 4, 2014, was removed by the city on March 17, 2016.
- Zmiiv
- Zolote (partially occupied by Russia)
- Zorynsk (occupied by Russia)
- Zuhres (occupied by Russia)

== See also ==
- List of statues of Joseph Stalin
- List of places named after Vladimir Lenin
- Fallen Monument Park
- Soviet-era statues
- List of statues of Karl Marx
- Chiang Kai-shek statues
