= Rozdilna urban hromada =

Coordinates: 46°49′19.715″N 30°14′51.479″E

Rozdilna urban hromada Роздільнянська міська громада
- Hromada
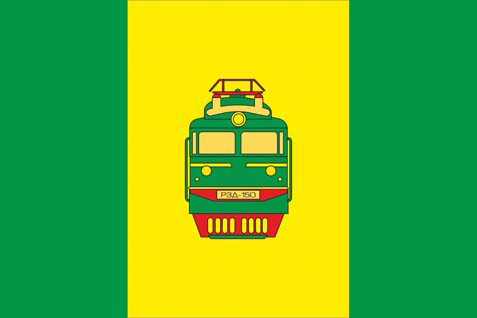
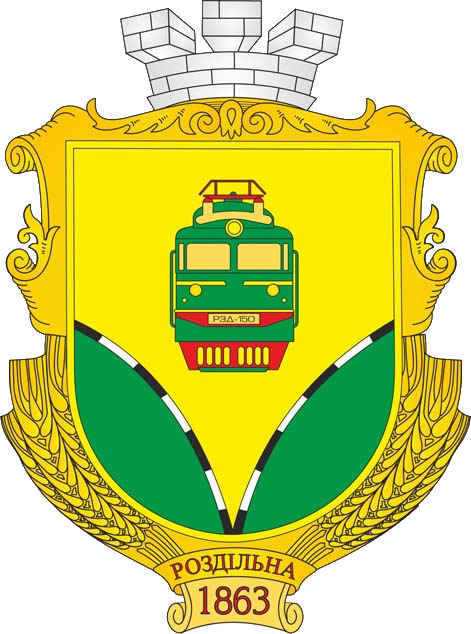
- Flag Coat of arms
- Interactive map of Rozdilna urban hromada
- Country: Ukraine
- Oblast: Odesa Oblast
- Raion: Rozdilna Raion
- Admin. center: Rozdilna

Area
  - Total: 766.4 km^{2} (295.9 sq mi)

Population (2021)
  - Total: 32,856
  - Density: 42.87/km^{2} (111.0/sq mi)
- CATOTTG code: UA51140130000082333
- Settlements: 51
- Cities: 1
- Villages: 50

Rozdilna urban hromada (Ukrainian: Роздільнянська міська громада) is a hromada in Rozdilna Raion of Odesa Oblast in southwestern Ukraine. Population: 32,856 (2022 estimate)

The hromada consists of a city of Rozdilna and 50 villages:

- Andriievo-Ivanove
- Antonivka
- Bakalove
- Balkove
- Betsylove
- Blahodatne
- Bohnatove
- Brynivka
- Budiachky
- Burdivka
- Butsynivka
- Kalantaivka
- Kamianka
- Kapaklieve
- Karpivka
- Karpove
- Koshary
- Kuzmenka
- Lozove
- Matyshivka
- Mykolaivka
- Miliardivka
- Nadiya
- Novyi Hrebenyk
- Novi Chobruchi
- Novohradenytsia
- Novodmytrivka
- Novodmytrivka Druha
- Novoselivka
- Novoukrainka
- Oleksandrivka
- Parkantsi
- Pershe Travnia
- Petro-Yevdokiivka
- Pokrovka
- Poniativka
- Potashenkove
- Shevchenkove
- Slobidka
- Starokostiantynivka
- Starostyne
- Sukhe
- Vakulivka
- Velizarove
- Vesele
- Vynohradar
- Volodymyrivka
- Yeremiivka
- Zhelepove

== Links ==
- Роздільнянська міська громада // Облікова картка на офіційному вебсайті Верховної Ради України.
- Роздільнянська територіальна громада
- Стратегія економічно-соціального розвитку Роздільнянської територіальної громади до 2025 року
