= Statue of Lenin (Seattle) =

Statue in Seattle, Washington, U.S.

- The Statue of Lenin in 2026

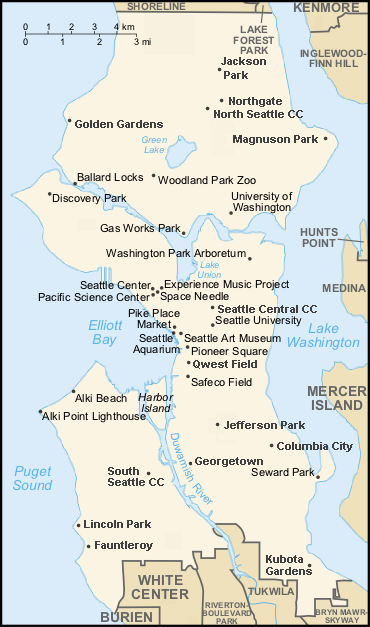
- The statue's location in Seattle
- Artist: Emil Venkov
- Year: 1988
- Type: Statue
- Medium: Bronze
- Subject: Vladimir Lenin
- Dimensions: 5 m (16 ft)
- Location: Seattle, Washington, U.S.; 47°39′05″N 122°21′04″W
- Website: Defunct (Archived link)

The Statue of Lenin is a 16-foot (5 m) bronze statue of Russian communist revolutionary Vladimir Lenin in the Fremont neighborhood of Seattle, Washington, United States. It was created by Bulgarian-born Slovak sculptor Emil Venkov and initially put on display in the Czechoslovak Socialist Republic in 1988, the year before the Velvet Revolution. After the revolutions of 1989 and dissolution of the Soviet Union, a wave of de-Leninization in Eastern Europe brought about the fall of many monuments in the former Soviet sphere. In 1993, the statue was bought by an American who had found it lying in a scrapyard. He brought it home with him to Washington State but died before he could carry out his plans to formally display it.

Since 1995, the statue has been held in trust waiting for a buyer, and has stood on display on a prominent street corner in Fremont. It has become a local landmark, frequently being either decorated or vandalized. The statue has sparked political controversy, including criticism for being communist chic and not taking the historic meaning of Leninism and communism seriously (or taking it too seriously), or by comparing the purported acceptance of such a charged political symbol to the removal of Confederate monuments and memorials. Much of the debate ignores the statue's private ownership and installation on private property, with the public and government having virtually no say in the matter.

== Commission and construction ==
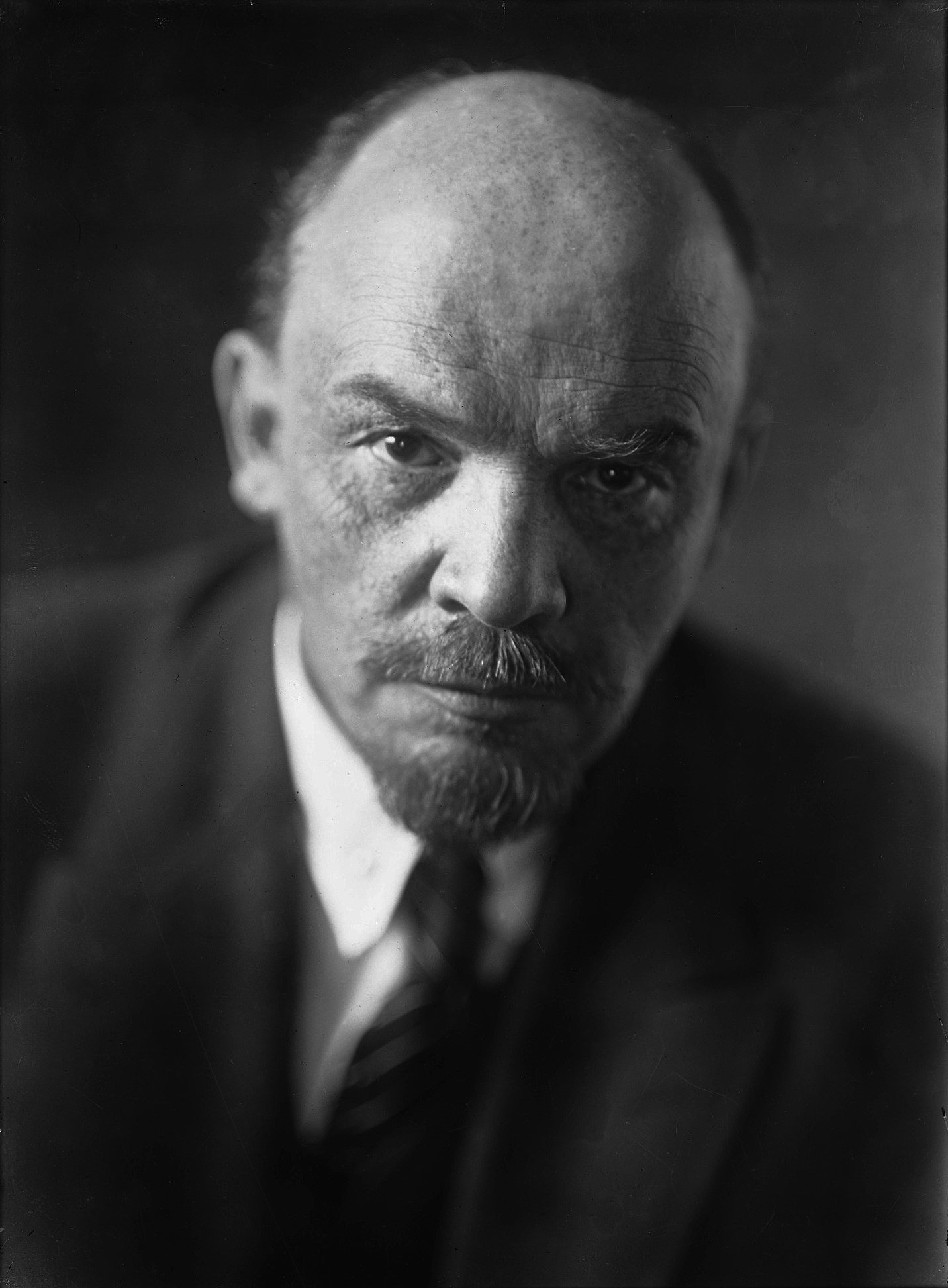
Vladimir Lenin, the subject of the sculpture.

The statue was constructed by Bulgarian-born Slovak sculptor Emil Venkov (1937–2017) under a 1981 commission from the Communist Party of Czechoslovakia. While following the bounds of his commission, Venkov intended to express his vision of Lenin as a violent revolutionary, in contrast to the traditional portrayals of Lenin as a philosopher and educator. According to fremont.com, "it is believed to be the only representation portraying Lenin surrounded by guns and flames instead of holding a book or waving his hat."

Venkov's work was completed and installed in Poprad, Czechoslovak Socialist Republic (now Slovakia) in 1988 at a cost of 334,000 Kčs, (equivalent to US$250,000 in 2025), shortly before the fall of the communist regime in Czechoslovakia during the 1989 Velvet Revolution.

== Sale and move to Seattle ==
Lewis E. Carpenter, an English teacher in Poprad originally from Issaquah, Washington, found the hollow monumental statue lying in a scrapyard with a homeless man living inside it. The Lenin statue was waiting to be cut up and sold for the price of the bronze. Carpenter had met and befriended Venkov in an earlier visit to Czechoslovakia. Carpenter's initial interest in buying the statue was to preserve it for its historic and artistic merit. Later he intended to use it to attract customers for an ethnic Slovak restaurant he wanted to open in Issaquah.

In close collaboration with a local journalist and good friend, Tomáš Fülöpp, Carpenter approached Poprad city officials, saying that despite its current unpopularity, the statue was still a work of art worth preserving, and offered to buy it for US$13,000 (equivalent to US$30,000 in 2025). After bureaucratic hurdles, he signed a contract with the Mayor of Poprad on March 16, 1993. The Mayor then began to reconsider, and asked the City Council to vote on the sale. After voting to approve it, the Poprad council reconsidered and asked the Slovak Ministry of Culture for its blessing, which was given four months later.

After final approval to buy and move the statue out of the country, Carpenter consulted with both Venkov and the architect who had overseen the original casting of the bronze before deciding to cut the statue into three pieces and ship it 1,500 miles (2,400 km) to Rotterdam, and then on to the United States, all of which ultimately cost US$40,000 (equivalent to US$90,000 in 2025). Carpenter financed much of that by mortgaging his home. The statue arrived in Issaquah in August 1993, and Carpenter planned to install it in front of a Slovak restaurant. He died in a car collision in February 1994, during public debates on whether to display the statue in Issaquah that ended in rejection from the suburb's residents. After Carpenter's death, his family planned to sell the statue to a Fremont foundry to be melted down and repurposed into a new piece. The foundry's founder, Peter Bevis, sought instead to display the statue in Fremont, and agreed to have the Fremont Chamber of Commerce hold the statue in trust for five years or until a buyer was found. The statue was unveiled on June 3, 1995, at the corner of Evanston Avenue North and North 34th Street on private property, one block south of the Fremont Rocket, another artistic Fremont attraction.

The owners moved the statue two blocks north to the intersection of Fremont Place North, North 36th Street and Evanston Avenue North in 1996, on a property with commercial retail spaces occupied by a Taco del Mar and a gelato shop at the time. The new location is three blocks west of the Fremont Troll, a Fremont art installation under the Aurora Bridge.

The Carpenter family continues to seek a buyer for the statue. As of 2015, the asking price was US$250,000, up from the 1996 price of US$150,000 (equivalent to US$310,000 in 2025).

== Fremont curiosity ==
The statue of Lenin became a Fremont landmark and object of curiosity, representing the quirky nature of the artistic neighborhood, whose motto is Libertas Quirkas – freedom to be peculiar. Like the Fremont Troll and the Waiting for the Interurban sculpture, the Lenin statue has often been decorated, appropriated, or vandalized with various intentions, both whimsical and serious.

Knute Berger, acknowledging that "we are supposed to be amused" by the "hippie whimsy" of a Soviet symbol in the middle of an American city, said that seeing the statue cannot help but remind us of the killing and repression Lenin inspired. However, Berger reflected that perhaps the meaning of this Soviet relic is the opposite, that it is "a trophy of Western triumphalism", representing the victory over communism and the fall of the Berlin Wall. By removing the statue from its original context where it was meant to keep the Slovak people in awe, given a new context where it oppresses no one and is used entirely in the service of free enterprise and profit making. Berger goes on to compare the Lenin statue with Native American totem poles, so many of which were once on display in the city that they became a "symbol of Seattle". Some of Seattle's most iconic 'totem poles' (actually Alaskan Tlingit carved house posts) were brazenly stolen from an Alaska village by respected members of the scientific and business community, the Harriman Alaska expedition, so immersed in the triumph of their own culture over that of Native Americans that little thought was given to what Dr. Robin K. Wright of the Burke Museum called "a very clear case of theft". Berger said the story of victory of one culture over another told by the totem pole, or the Lenin statue, make it "an icon, but if you know the story, a complicated one."

A glowing Soviet-style red star or Christmas lights have been added to the statue during the winter holiday season since 2004. For the 2004 Solstice Parade, the statue was made to look like John Lennon. During Gay Pride Week, the statue is dressed in drag.

The statue was highlighted in the media after protesters removed Lenin statues in Ukraine.

The statue's hands are often painted (and repainted) red to protest what critics perceive as the glorification of what they see as a historical villain who has blood on his hands. The Taco del Mar restaurant, one of the retail property's tenants, constructed a monumental-scale burrito wrapped in foil for the statue to hold, which one Fremont publisher said did not turn out as intended, but rather "looked like a doobie."

In June 2017, the statue's sculptor, Emil Venkov, died at age 79. The Association of Slovak Artists noted the loss of an artist whose long career helped define Slovak monumental and architectural sculpture, creating works distinctive for their subtext.

Some groups have called for removal of Fremont's Lenin statue. On August 16, 2017, in the wake of the Charlottesville, Virginia Unite the Right rally, conservative commentator Jack Posobiec led a gathering of several protesters at the statue to demand its removal. The same day, Mayor Ed Murray said his office contacted Lake View Cemetery to "express our concerns" about the United Confederate Veterans Memorial there, and ask for its removal. On August 17, Murray added that he believed the Lenin statue should go as well, because we should "not idolize figures who have committed violent atrocities and sought to divide us", though he was aware the Lenin statue was also on private property. In the following days, a city staffer told The Washington Post off the record that the Seattle City Council was considering debating a symbolic resolution on removing the Lenin statue and the Confederate memorial, though the city government has no power to remove either against the wishes of the owners, since neither monument, nor the properties they are on, are city-owned. In an article discussing Confederate monuments in USA Today, Allen Guelzo said that there should be a movement of protesters asking that the statue be removed, as Lenin's "murderous ideas and deeds dwarf any of [the] sins" of Robert E. Lee.

A bill introduced to the state legislature in early 2019 by a group of Republican representatives called for the statue's removal and replacement, in response to a bill reconsidering a statue of Marcus Whitman at the Washington State Capitol. One of Fremont's major landowners, businesswoman Suzie Burke, told KUOW radio that if any of the bill's sponsors actually lived in the Seattle area, she would have invited them to come to Fremont to discuss it, and she would have reminded them that the government does not have the authority to remove privately owned artwork on private property. One of the bill's sponsors said he would never infringe on private property rights, and that the bill was intended as a tongue-in-cheek reaction to State Senate opposition to the Whitman statue.

== See also ==
- East Village Lenin Statue, also in the United States
