= Rozdilna =

City in Odesa Oblast, Ukraine

Rozdilna Роздільна
- City
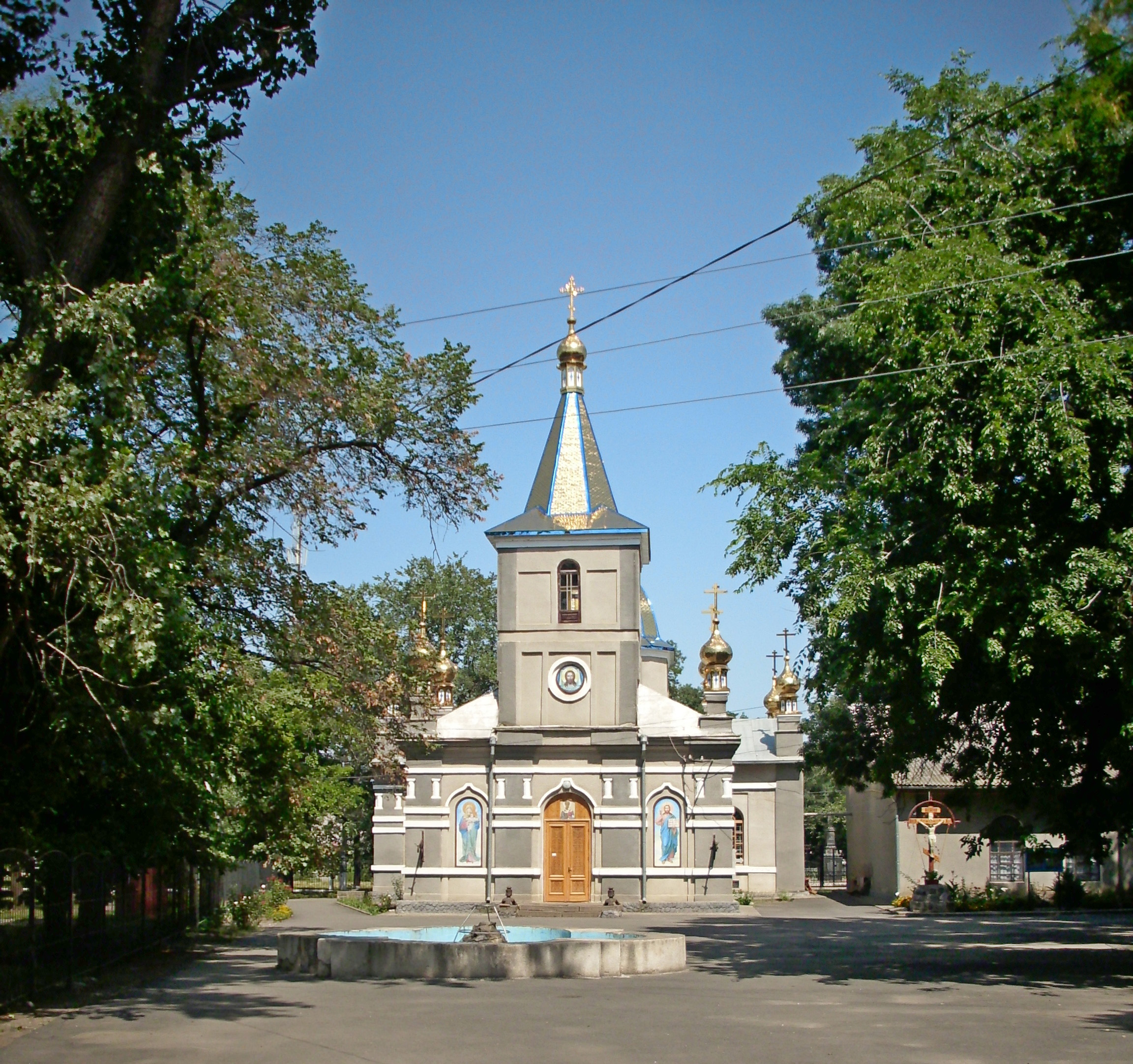
- Saint Nicholas church

- Flag Coat of arms

- Location in Ukraine Rozdilna (Ukraine)
- Coordinates: 46°50′55″N 30°4′45″E
- Country: Ukraine
- Oblast: Odesa Oblast
- Raion: Rozdilna Raion
- Hromada: Rozdilna urban hromada

Area
  - Total: 7.2 km^{2} (2.8 sq mi)
- Elevation: 134 m (440 ft)

Population (2022)
  - Total: 17,441
- Time zone: UTC+2 (EET)
  - Summer (DST): UTC+3 (EEST)
- Postal code: 67400
- Area code: +380-04853
- Website: rozdilna-rada.gov.ua

Rozdilna (Ukrainian: Роздільна, IPA: [rozˈd⁽ʲ⁾ilʲnɐ]; Russian: Раздельная, romanized: Razdelnaya) is a small city in Odesa Oblast, southern Ukraine. It serves as the administrative center of Rozdilna Raion, and was founded in 1863. Rozdilna hosts the administration of Rozdilna urban hromada, one of the hromadas of Ukraine. Population: 17,227 (2024 estimate).

== History ==
Rozdilna in 1914:

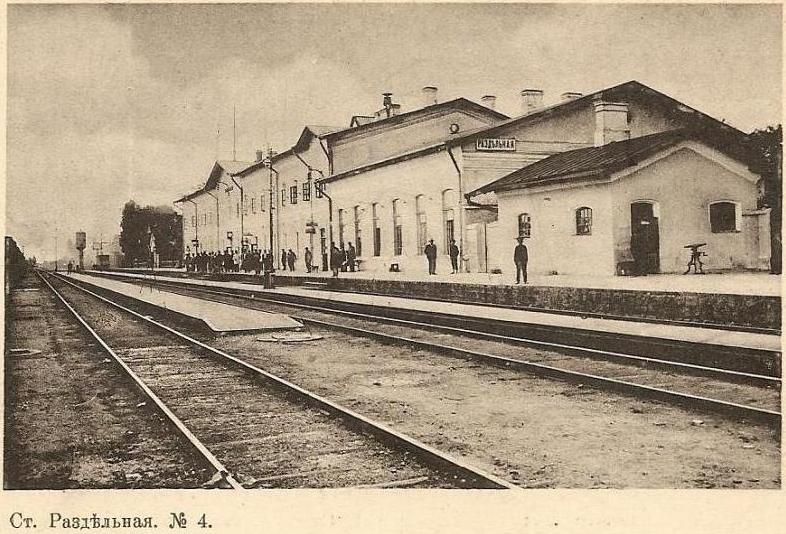
Rozdilna train station

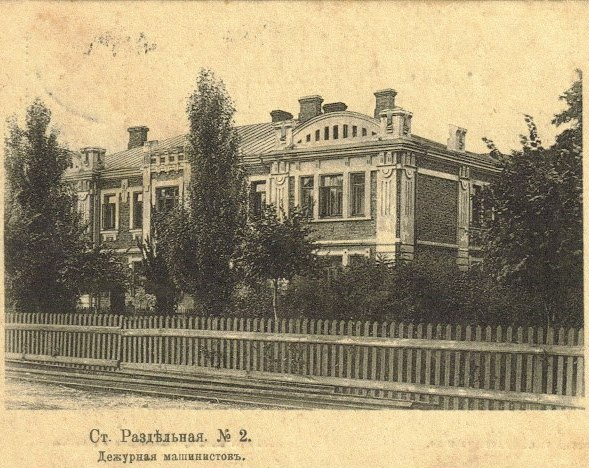
The Machinist's House

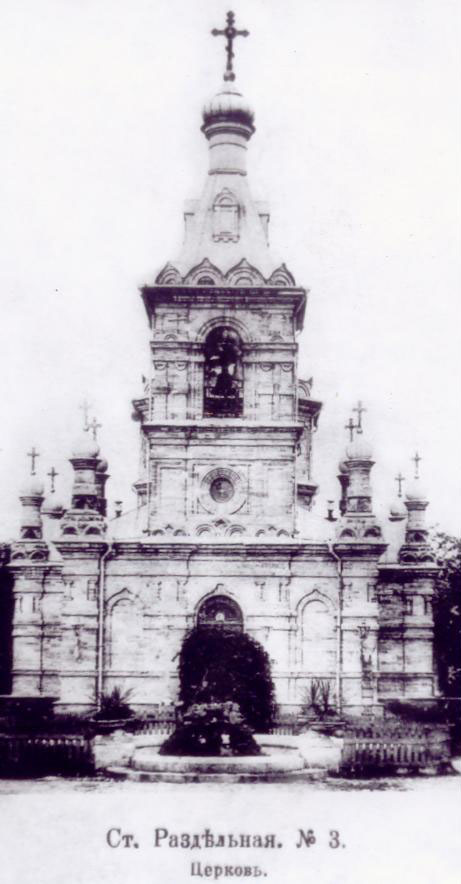
St. Nicholas' church

== Geography ==
=== Climate ===
Climate data for Rozdilna (1991–2020)
Month	Jan	Feb	Mar	Apr	May	Jun	Jul	Aug	Sep	Oct	Nov	Dec	Year
Mean daily maximum °C (°F)	0.6 (33.1)	2.9 (37.2)	8.8 (47.8)	16.3 (61.3)	22.5 (72.5)	26.6 (79.9)	29.2 (84.6)	29.0 (84.2)	22.7 (72.9)	15.5 (59.9)	8.0 (46.4)	2.4 (36.3)	15.4 (59.7)
Daily mean °C (°F)	−2.3 (27.9)	−0.7 (30.7)	3.9 (39.0)	10.5 (50.9)	16.5 (61.7)	20.7 (69.3)	23.0 (73.4)	22.6 (72.7)	16.8 (62.2)	10.5 (50.9)	4.5 (40.1)	−0.4 (31.3)	10.5 (50.9)
Mean daily minimum °C (°F)	−4.6 (23.7)	−3.6 (25.5)	0.4 (32.7)	5.9 (42.6)	11.2 (52.2)	15.4 (59.7)	17.6 (63.7)	17.3 (63.1)	12.1 (53.8)	6.7 (44.1)	1.8 (35.2)	−2.8 (27.0)	6.5 (43.7)
Average precipitation mm (inches)	36 (1.4)	29 (1.1)	32 (1.3)	28 (1.1)	45 (1.8)	66 (2.6)	57 (2.2)	44 (1.7)	53 (2.1)	37 (1.5)	38 (1.5)	35 (1.4)	500 (19.7)
Average precipitation days (≥ 1.0 mm)	6.4	5.7	6.4	5.6	7.1	6.9	5.9	4.2	5.0	4.9	5.2	6.2	69.5
Average relative humidity (%)	85.1	81.1	73.9	65.5	65.0	64.3	61.0	59.0	67.4	76.6	84.8	86.3	72.5
Source: NOAA

== Demographics ==
According to the 2001 Ukrainian census, Rozdilna counted 17,615 inhabitants. Accounting for over 80% of the population, ethnic Ukrainians constitute a large majority in the settlement. Notable minorities are Russians, Moldovans, Bulgarians and Belarusians. The exact distribution of the population by ethnicity was:

Ethnic composition of Rozdilna
	percent
Ukrainians	80.11%
Russians	14.21%
Moldovans	1.89%
Bulgarians	1.37%
Belarusians	0.63%
Armenians	0.45%
Ashkenazi Jews	0.13%
Poles	0.10%
Gagauz	0.08%
