= Fremont Rocket =

Sculpture in Seattle, Washington, U.S.

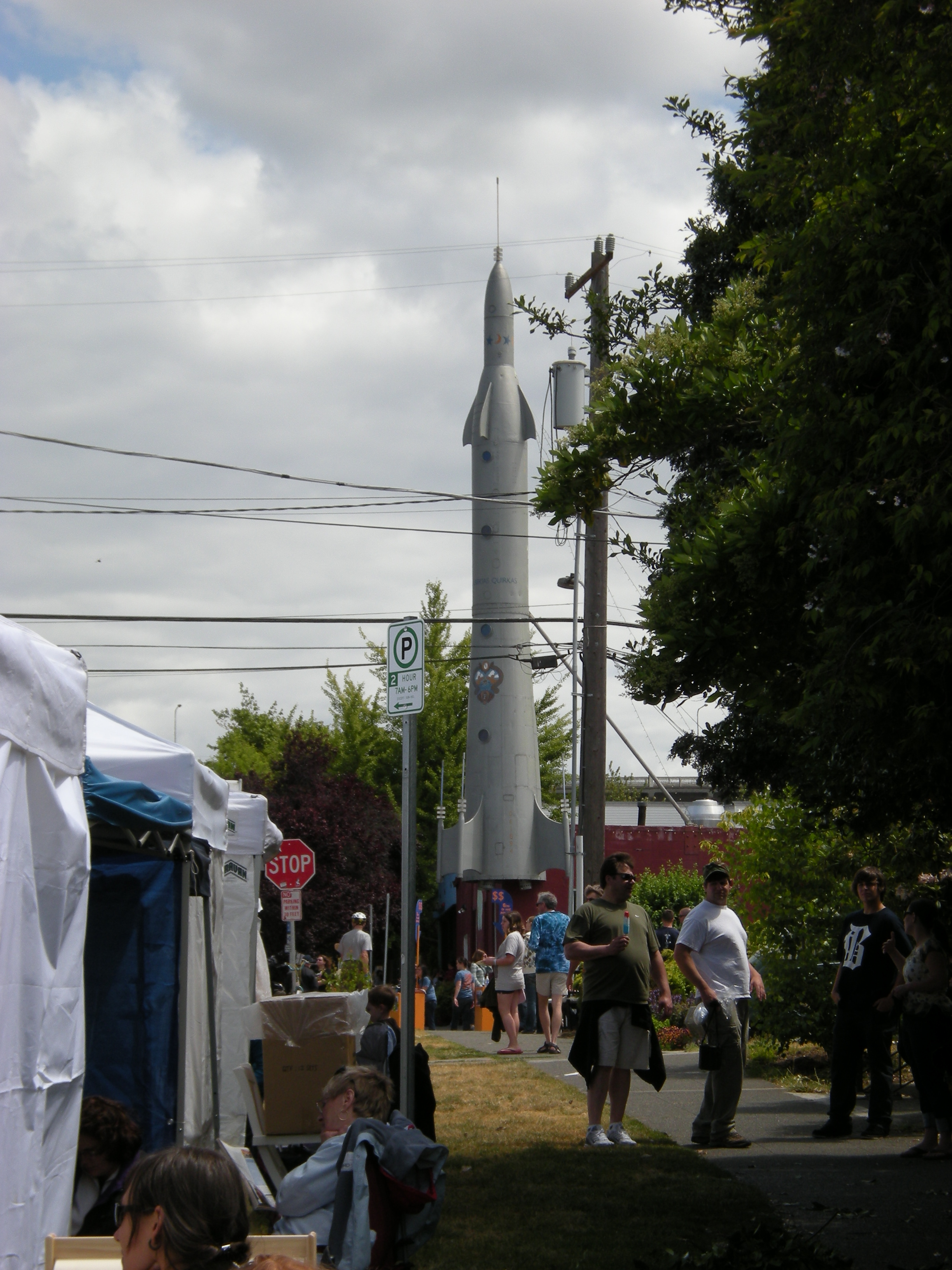
- The rocket in 2009
- Year: before 1991
- Medium: Found object sculpture
- Dimensions: 16 m (53 ft)
- Location: Seattle, Washington, U.S.
- 47.65061°N 122.35118°W

The Fremont Rocket is a sculpture of a rocket in the Fremont neighborhood of Seattle, Washington, US. The rocket had been displayed at an army surplus store in Seattle's Belltown neighborhood until 1991, when a news radio broadcast said the store was dismantling its "circa 1950 Cold War rocket fuselage [sic]", prompting the Fremont Business Association to buy it for $750. The Business Association took a few years to overcome problems with assembling and erecting the rocket, finally placing it at its current location at N 35th St. and Evanston Ave N. on June 3, 1994.

Though the salvaged "rocket fuselage" description has been repeated by some sources, and a Fremont chamber of commerce member called it a "de-fanged Cold War emblem", it is not made of any rocket or missile parts but rather from a military surplus tail boom originally part of a Fairchild C-119 'Flying Boxcar' transport aircraft. It has a stereotypical 1920s streamlined Art Deco sci-fi space rocket appearance, adorned with "neon laser pods" in the style of rayguns.

The rocket bears Fremont's coat of arms and motto De Libertas Quirkas or "Freedom to be Peculiar", and was called "phallic and zany-looking" by Lonely Planet, which said the neighborhood has adopted it as a "community totem". The rocket's proximity to Fremont's Statue of Lenin contributed to its image as a Cold War relic.

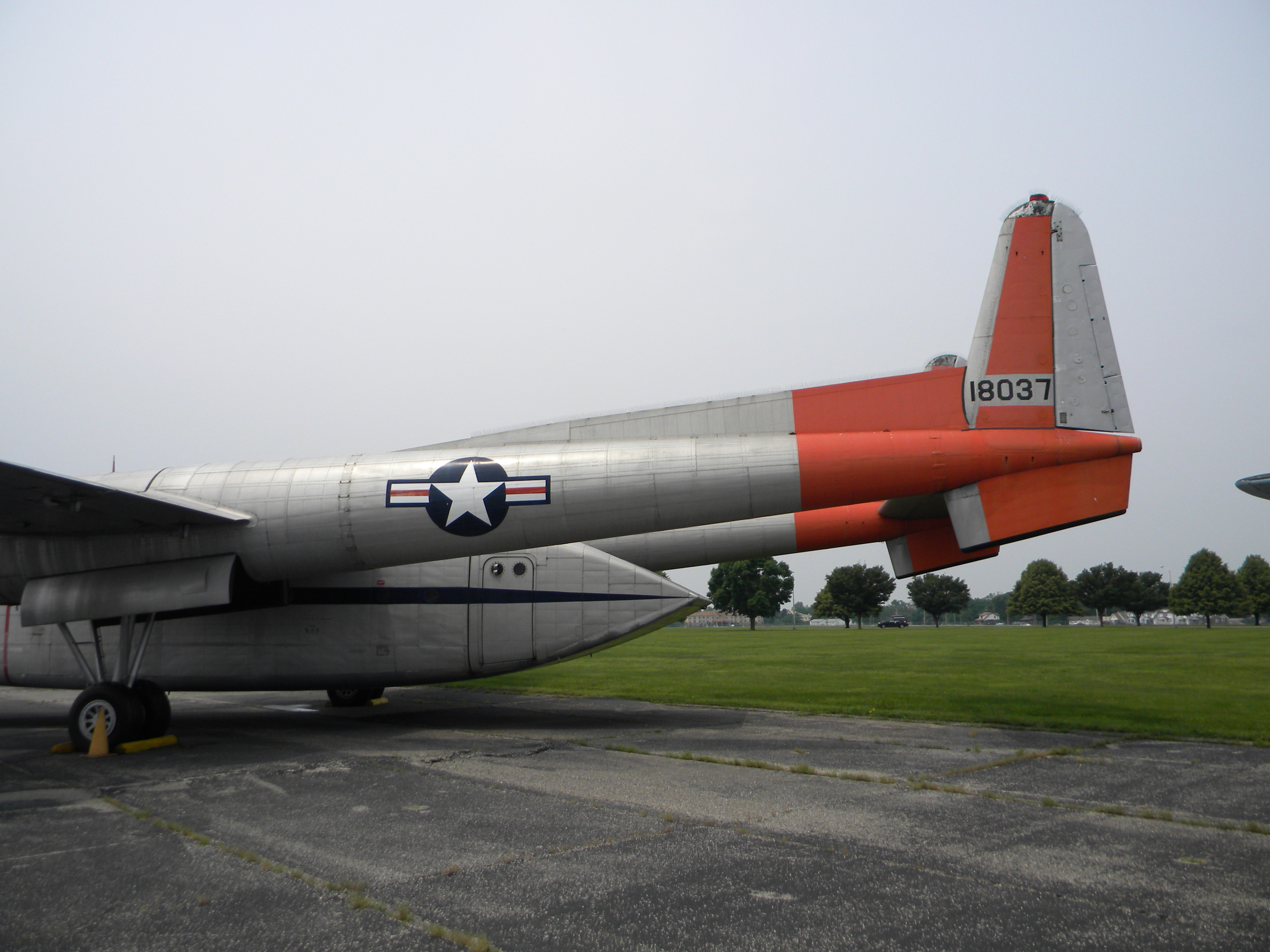
C119 tail booms
