= Statue of Sofia =

Statue of Sofia Статуя на София
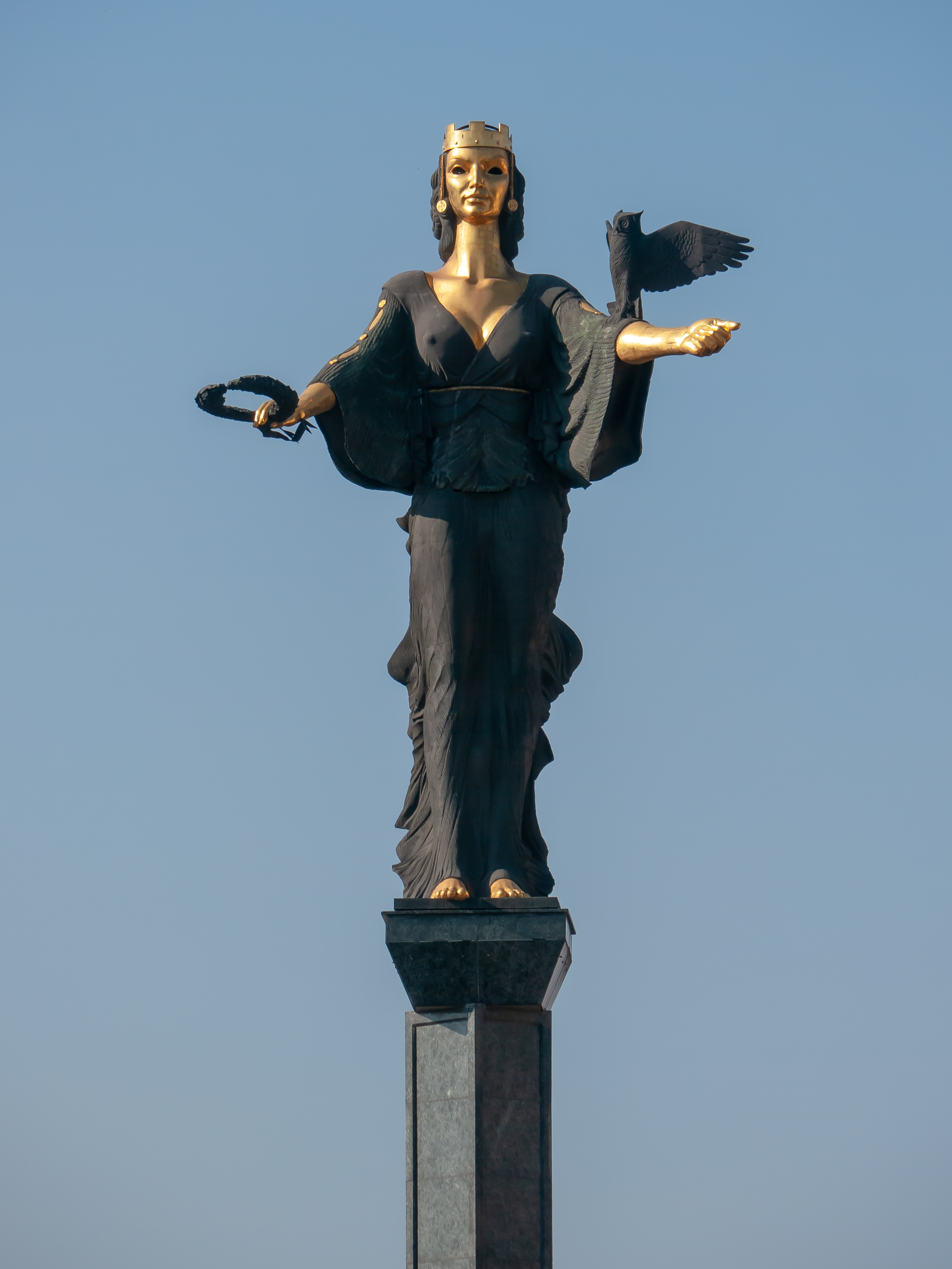
- Interactive map of Statue of Sofia; Статуя на София
- 42°41′52.0434″N 23°19′17.2884″E
- Location: St Nedelya Square; Sofia, Bulgaria

History
- Erected: 2000

Site notes
- Height: Statue itself: 8.08 meters (26 feet 6 inches); Dark granite pylon: 16 meters (52 feet 5.9 inches); Ground to crown: 24 meters (79 feet)
- Sculptor: Georgi Chapkanov
- Governing body: Sofia Municipality

The Statue of Sofia (Bulgarian: Статуя на София, romanized: Statuya na Sofiya) is a monumental sculpture in Sofia, Bulgaria. It was officially opened to the public by the capital's mayor Stefan Sofiyanski on December 28, 2000.

The Statue of Sofia was approved by the Sofia City Council on September 17, 2000, known as the Day of Sofia in Bulgaria. The Bulgarian Orthodox Church honours the martyr Sophia of Rome on this date. The statue was intended as a symbol for better times in the new millennium, and was erected in two days from December 25–27, 2000 in a spot once occupied by a statue of Lenin.

The Statue of Sofia is named after the capital of Bulgaria, which in turn is named after the Saint Sophia Church. Likewise, the statue was planned to be named Saint Sophia, although the Orthodox Church considered it too pagan to be associated with Sophia of Rome. The Statue of Sofia is by the sculptor Georgi Chapkanov, who argued that it is a symbol for all residents of the capital, regardless of religion. In other words, the project was controversial connoting the pagan Sophia (wisdom) of the Hellenistic period. 8.08 meters (26 feet 6 inches) in height with a weight of about 5 tons, the copper and bronze statue stands on a 16 meters (52 feet 5.9 inches) high pedestal. Adorned with the symbols of power (crown), fame (wreath) and wisdom (owl), the crown is also associated with the Goddess of Fate, Tyche, inspired by the old emblem of Sofia dating back to 1900.
