= Svitanok, Rozdilna Raion, Odesa Oblast =

Village in Odesa Oblast, Ukraine

Svitanok Світанок
- Location in Ukraine Svitanok (Ukraine)
- Coordinates: 46°45′06″N 30°20′08″E
- Country: Ukraine
- Oblast: Odesa Oblast
- Raion: Rozdilna Raion
- Hromada: Rozdilna urban hromada

Area
  - Total: 0.479 km^{2} (0.185 sq mi)
- Elevation: 44 m (144 ft)

Population (2001)
  - Total: 192
- Time zone: UTC+2 (EET)
  - Summer (DST): UTC+3 (EEST)
- Postal code: 67400
- Area code: +380-04853
- Website: rozdilna-rada.gov.ua

Svitanok (Ukrainian: Світанок; formerly known as Andriievo-Ivanove) is a village in Rozdilna Raion of Odesa Oblast (province) of southern Ukraine. It is part of Rozdilna urban hromada, one of the hromadas of Ukraine.

== History ==
Svitanok was founded in 1944 by uniting several farms and inclusion in it by the former Jewish and German agricultural settlements of Shtern (Zorya, Miller, Lambert). In 1924, 67 people lived in Shtern, and 202 lived there in 1943. On 1 February 1945, the village was given the name Andriievo-Ivanove by the Supreme Soviet of the Ukrainian Soviet Socialist Republic. On 1 September 1946, the village of Andriievo-Ivanove was part of the Bryniv Village Council. On 1 May 1967, the Kirov collective farm was located in Andriievo-Ivanove.

In September 2024 the village was renamed, by the Ukrainian parliament to Svitanok to comply with the Ukrainian decolonization law.

== Demographics ==
According to the 1989 Soviet census, the population of the village was 217 people, of whom 99 were men and 118 women.

According to the 2001 Ukrainian census, 192 people lived in the village.

=== Languages ===
According to the 2001 census, the primary languages of the inhabitants of the village were:

Language	Percentage
Ukrainian	70.83 %
Moldovan (Romanian)	18.75 %
Russian	9.38 %
Gagauz	1.04 %
