= Africa Park =

Public park in Addis Ababa, Ethiopia

Africa Park in Addis Ababa, Ethiopia
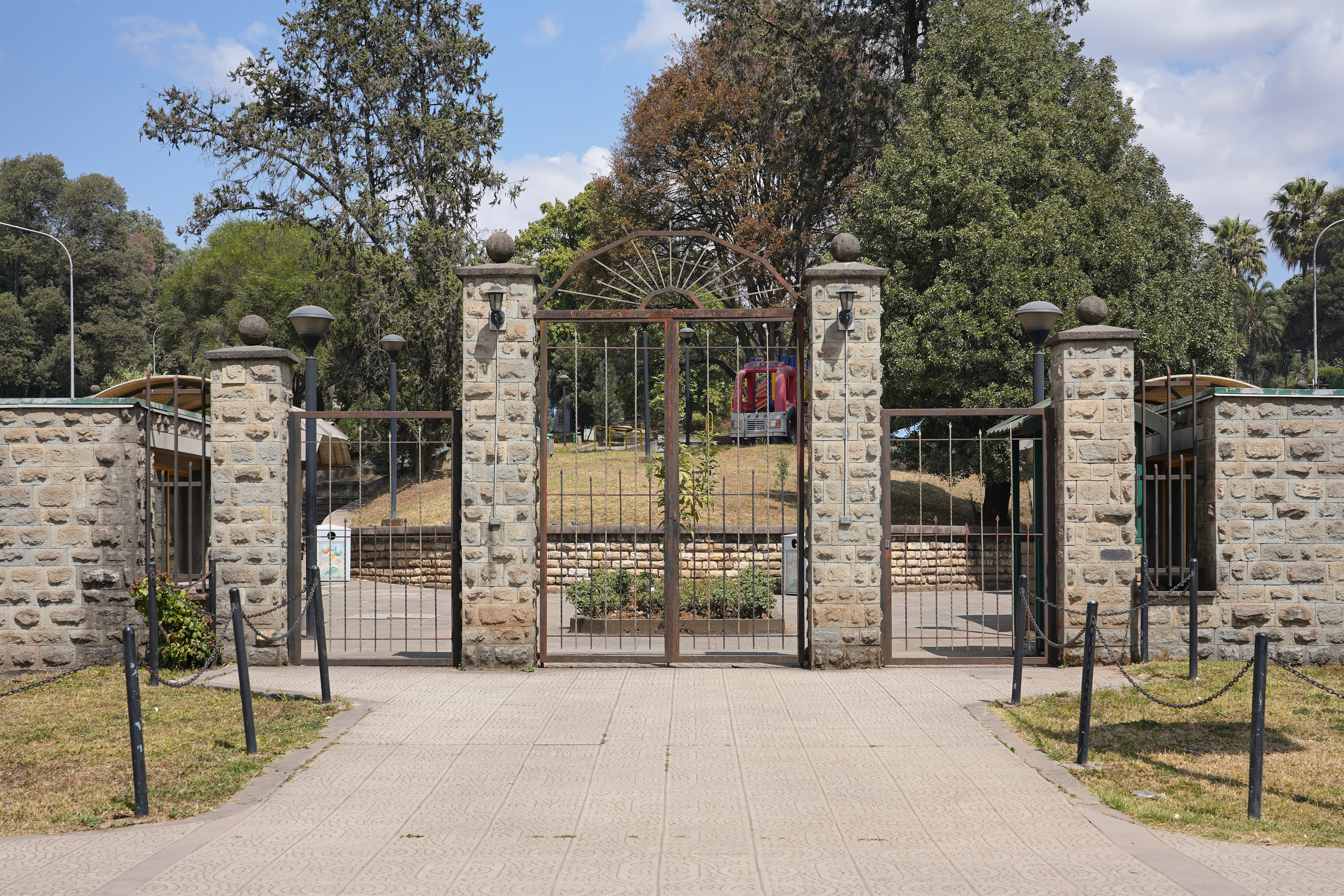
- Interactive map of Africa Park in Addis Ababa, Ethiopia
- Coordinates: 9°01′06″N 38°45′48″E

Africa Park is a park situated along Menelik II Avenue in Addis Ababa, Ethiopia. It stretches from Menelik Palace to the United Nations Economic Commission for Africa. Established in 1963, the park commemorates the foundation of the Organization of African Unity. It has been re-designed by Show Engineering Workshop in 1999 by Olivier Panhuys and architect Charbel Sassine. The park contains trees that were planted by heads of state during the 1963 inauguration, each tree bearing a label stating the leader's name alongside the flag of the nation.
