= East Village Lenin Statue =

Original Soviet sculpture of Vladimir Lenin in New York City's East Village

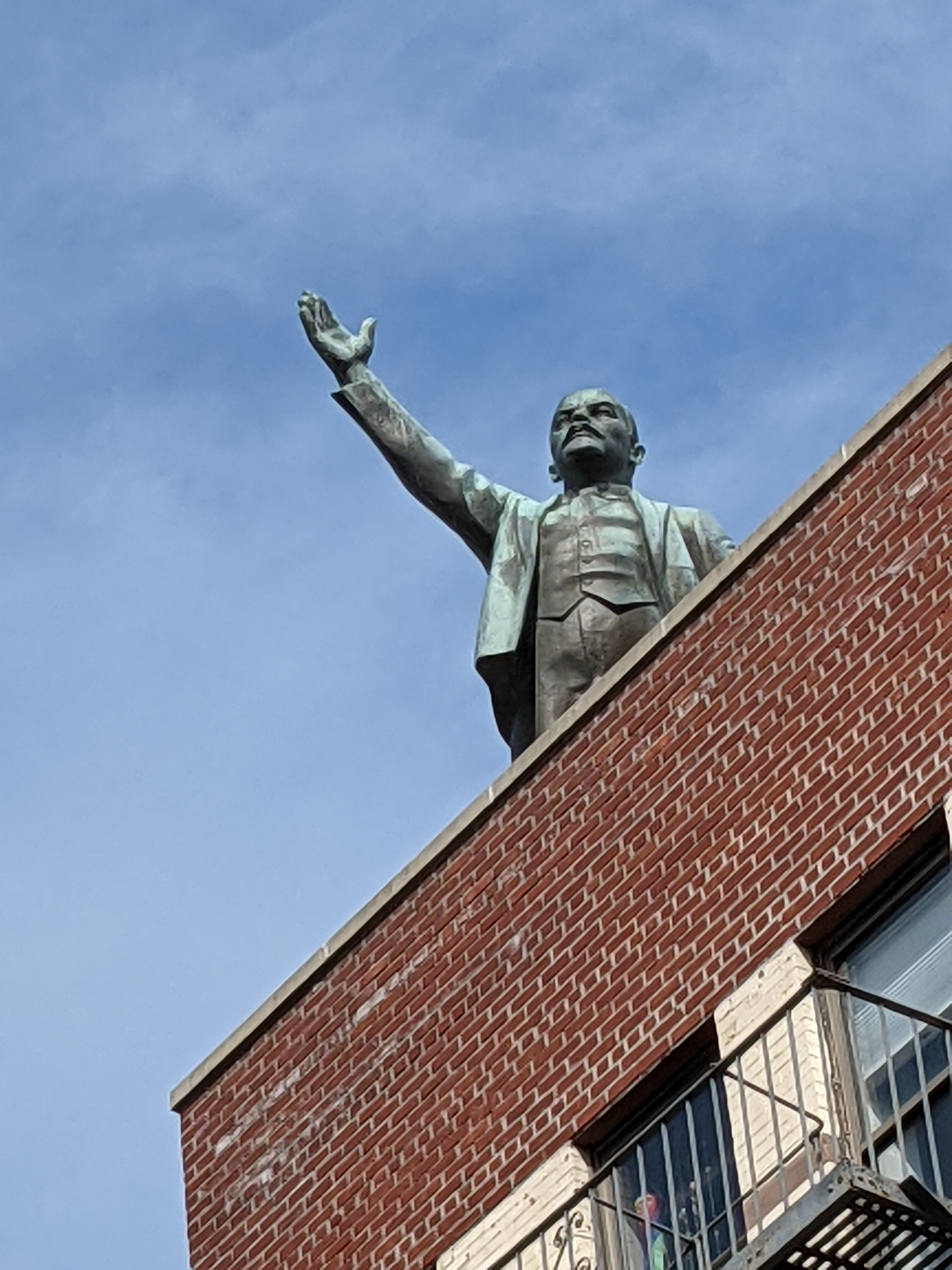
- Artist: Yuri Gerasimov
- Year: 1982
- Medium: Bronze
- Dimensions: 5.5 m (18 ft)
- Location: New York City; 40°43′16.9″N 73°59′8.7″W

The East Village Lenin Statue is an 18-foot (5.5 m) statue of Russian revolutionary Vladimir Lenin that stands on the roof of 178 Norfolk Street on the Lower East Side of Manhattan in New York City. After originally standing atop the fittingly named Red Square building on 250 Houston St. in the East Village for about 20 years, it was moved to Norfolk St. in 2017 following the Red Square's $100 million sale to the Dermot Company.

== Background ==
In 1989, during the Dissolution of the Soviet Union, real estate developers Michael Shaoul and Michael Rosen constructed the aforementioned "Red Square" building in Manhattan's East Village. Already having named their building after the Red Square in Moscow, Rosen and Shaoul discovered an original, Soviet Union-commissioned statue of Lenin by Yuri Gerasimov in the trash while they were in Moscow, decided it couldn't be discarded, and arranged for it to be installed on their building's roof in 1994.

== Significance ==
In a 2016 interview with The New York Times, Rosen said that the statue was intended to reflect the politically inclined culture of the Red Square's neighborhood, dubbing it "an homage to the history of the Lower East Side, which had been a hotbed of political thought." While having the statue face Wall Street was intentional, the owners have not specified if there was any further meaning behind that gesture.

In March 2022, it, once again, reflected Downtown Manhattan's political thought, as it was illuminated in the colors of the Ukrainian flag at its new home on Norfolk Street.

== See also ==
- Statue of Lenin (Seattle), also in the United States
