= Monument to Lenin on Tverskaya Square =

Sculpture of Vladimir Lenin in Moscow

- Памятник Ленину на Тверской площади
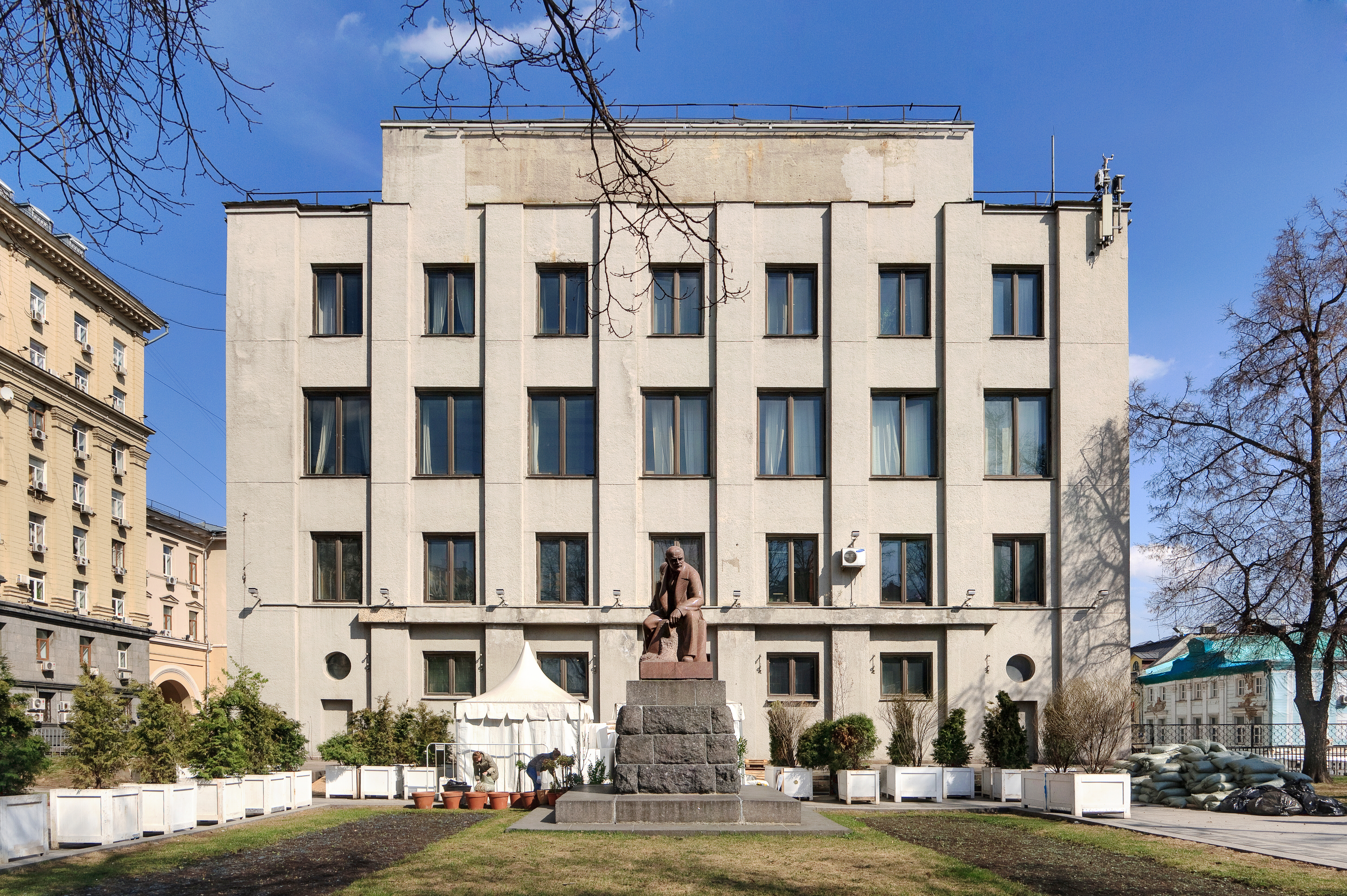
- Interactive map of Monument to Lenin on Tverskaya Square
- Location: Tverskaya square, Moscow
- Designer: I.A. Frantsuz

Monument to Lenin on Tverskaya Square (Russian: Памятник Ленину на Тверской площади) is a sculpture of Vladimir Lenin located in front of the Russian State Archive of Socio-Political History building in Moscow. Established in 1940. The authors of the monument are sculptor S. D. Merkurov and architect I. A. Frantsuz. The monument has the status of an object of cultural heritage of federal significance.

== Description ==
Sculpture of Vladimir Lenin is made of red granite. It is installed on a pedestal made of blocks of dark gray granite. Lenin is depicted seated and tilted forward. It seems that he listens carefully to his interlocutor. With his left hand, Lenin leaned on his knee, with a notebook in it. The right hand with a pencil - behind the back of the chair. According to art historian N. D. Sobolevsky, "the plastic expression of the sculptural image is in perfect harmony with the psychologically vivid and vivid image of Ilyich".

The location of the monument was not chosen randomly. Lenin repeatedly spoke at the Tverskaya (then Soviet) Square from the balcony of the Moscow City Council building (now Moscow City Hall), which is reminiscent of a memorial plaque. The monument was installed opposite the building of the Lenin Institute under the Central Committee of the CPSU (b).

Before the installation of the monument, the sculpture of Lenin was demonstrated at the World Exhibition in 1939 in New York City.
