= Monumental propaganda =

Soviet Union propaganda ideology

"Monumental Propaganda" is a strategy proposed by Vladimir Lenin of employing visual monumental art (revolutionary slogans and monumental sculpture) as an important means for propagating revolutionary and communist ideas. The plan had the significance of creating a large demand for monumental sculpture on a state level, and thus it stands at the origins of the Soviet school of sculpture. The plan consisted of two main projects: decorating buildings and other surfaces "traditionally used for banners and posters" with revolutionary slogans and memorial relief plaques, and the vast erection of "temporary, plaster-cast" monuments in honor of great revolutionary leaders.

== Plan ==
Realization of the plan was initiated with a decree issued by Sovnarkom (the Council of People's Commissars) "On Republic's monuments" (sanctioned 12 April 1918), which ordained removal of monuments "erected in honor of tzars and their servants" and the development of projects for monuments to the Russian Socialist Revolution" . The section of visual arts of Narkompros (People's Commissariat for Education) drew up a list of personalities in honor of whom the monuments were to be erected. Included in the list were not only revolutionaries and great public figures but also great Russian and foreign scientists, philosophers, poets and writers, artists, composers and actors – 67 persons in all. In addition to sculptures of individuals the plan of monumental propaganda also assumed projects for allegorical compositions.

== Construction ==
Noted sculptors from all-over Russia, mainly from Moscow and Petrograd (present-day Saint Petersburg) were engaged in the task of designing monuments. Thus a strong impetus was given for formation and progressive development of the Soviet school of sculpture. The state commission for monumental sculpture was determinative in shaping the mainstream tendencies of evolution of Soviet sculpture: the prevalence of urban monuments, the criterion of social significance as a thematic guideline, patriotism, subdued expression of emotions, heroic content, idealization and artistic brevity, excessive pathos at times, grandiosity of scale.

== Reception ==
The memoirs of Leonid Sherwood, the oldest of Russian sculptors at that time, render the rising optimism about "the plan" among sculptors: "… Not only was I delighted, but also amazed that despite the immense destitutions that we were experiencing at that time, the young Soviet State put forward a demand for sculpture, a demand which traditionally associated with wealthy individual clients or economically prosperous social organizations. Today, of course, it is clear for us that Lenin's plan of "monumental propaganda" was intrinsically connected with the cause of the cultural revolution brought about by the Great days of the October and aimed to "rebuild" people's consciousness".

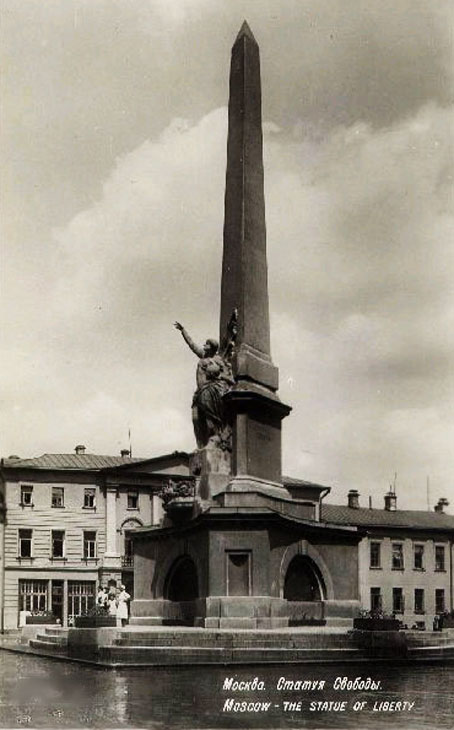
Nikolay Andreyev, D. Osipov. Monument to the First Soviet Constitution (Obelisk with a Statue of Liberty) in Soviet Square (present-day Tverskaya Square) in Moscow. Brick, Concrete, height =26 m. 1918-1919. (Taken down in 1941)

== Demise ==
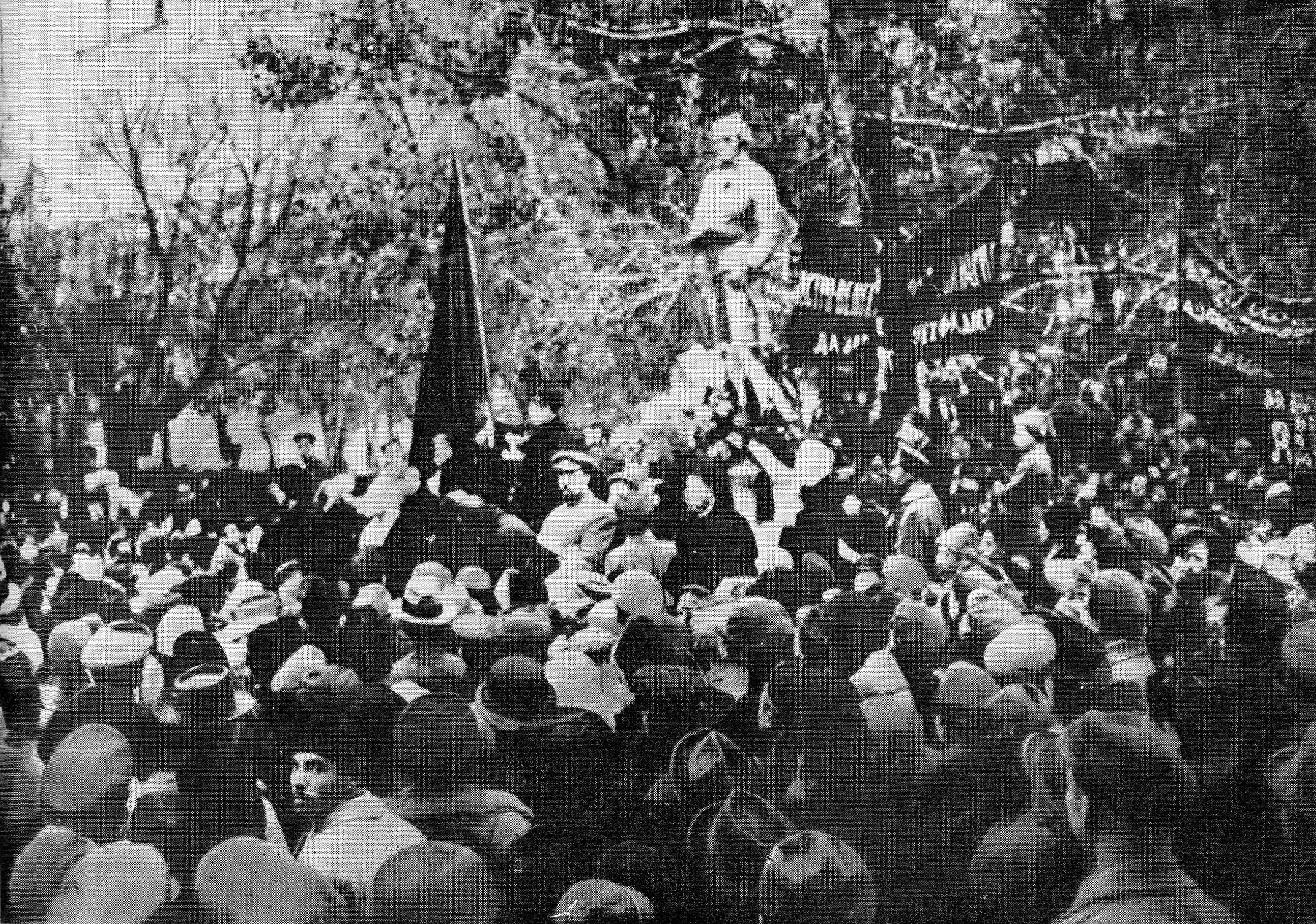
The Robespierre Monument being unveiled on 3 November 1918. It was destroyed only three days later.

In a situation of post-civil war economic crisis of the 1920s "the plan" lacked the necessary financial support and thus did not completely fulfill itself. Compromises often had to be made, such as the use of inexpensive materials, e.g. plaster and concrete, not fit best for public monuments. Striving to overcome these drawbacks Russian sculptors showed remarkable ingenuity: Nikolay Andreyev added marble granules to concrete mixture, creating a convincing illusion of a high-quality stone. Thus financial difficulties did not slow down the work on "monumental propaganda" plan. Lenin himself zealously worked to resolve the monetary issue for this cause because "monumental propaganda" was to implement what Lenin thought to be one of the most crucial aspects of the Revolution – the so-called "cultural revolution". In 1924 first bronze monuments were set up in Moscow after the October Revolution.

The earliest monuments of "the plan" appeared on the streets and squares of Moscow and Petrograd (present-day Saint Petersburg) in time for the first anniversary of the October Revolution on 7 November 1918. The most significant of these monuments was the obelisk dedicated to the First Soviet Constitution (several months later the obelisk was completed with the Statue of Liberty). From 1918–1921 in Moscow alone over 25 sculptural monuments were set up and more than 15 monuments were erected in Petrograd.

== Legacy ==
A widespread opinion is that the "monumental propaganda" "did not achieve any outstanding artistic result". Such a view is certainly subjective. Most of these works were executed by exceptionally skilled and talented sculptors and among the authors are very prominent masters like Sergey Merkurov, Sergey Konenkov, Vera Mukhina whose works (including the "monumental propaganda" projects) are highly appraised by Russian art historians and scholars. One should also keep in mind the restrictions of materials, such as concrete, that the sculptors had to overcome. And if the esthetic evaluation of the "monumental propaganda" sculptures is subject to debates, the historical value of Lenin's initiative on "monumental propaganda" as an impulse for the formation of the Soviet school of sculpture is doubtless.

To our days the streets of Moscow have preserved a few of the early sculptural monuments and relief plaques that were installed in the years between 1918–1923 as part of the "monumental propaganda" plan. The sculptures were later transferred into traditional durable materials. Some of them are well-known to Russians and especially the native dwellers of Moscow today:

- the Dostoevsky Monument, Dostoevsky Street by Sergey Merkurov (initially on Tsvetnoy Boulevard and now located by the Mariinskaya Hospital)
- "The Thought", a sculpture by Sergey Merkurov (initially on Tsvetnoy Boulevard but now on Merkurov's grave at the Novodevichy Cemetery)
- the monument to Russian botanist Kliment Timiryazev, by Sergey Merkurov (in Tverskoy Boulevard)
- the monuments to Russian political activists, writers and revolutionaries Alexander Herzen and Nikolay Ogarev – by Nikolay Andreyev (presently the sculptures are located in front of the Institute of Asian and African Studies of Moscow State University in Mokhovaya Street)
- the tondo-relief depicting a worker and a peasant by G. Alekseyev (this tondo replaced Moscow's old coat of arms on the façade of the Lenin Museum, which is located in the building of the former Moscow City Hall next to the State Historical Museum on Red Square)
- the relief with an image of a brawny worker-athlete by Matvey Manizer (on the wall of the Petrovsky Passage)
- The medallion with a portrait of the Russian revolutionary and writer Alexander Herzen by Nikolay Andreyev (located on the Gates' pylon of the house №25 in Tverskoy Boulevard).

Among the early "monumental propaganda" monuments preserved in Saint Petersburg:

- the monument to the Russian revolutionary and theorist of Marxism Georgi Plekhanov, by I. Ginzburg (it is a double-figure composition: Plekhanov delivering a speech from a rostrum and a young worker next to the rostrum holding a banner) – the monument was cast in bronze in 1925 and set up in front of the Institute of Technology.

== See also ==
- Soviet-era statues
- Vladimir Lenin monument, Kyiv

== Sources ==
- Encyclopedia of World Art (in XV vol.). N.Y., Toronto, London: McGraw-Hill Book Company, 1967. Vol.XIV, Union of Soviet Socialist Republics: Modern movements.
- Istoriya Russkogo Iskusstva, tom. XI. (The History of Russian Art, vol.XI). Moscow: USSR Academy of Sciences, 1957.
- Shefov, Alexander. Skul'ptory Andreyevy. Moscow: Izdatel'skiy Dom TONCHU, 2009.
- Sobolevskiy, N. Skul'pturnyye pam'yatniki i monumenty v Moskve (Sculptures and sculptural monuments in Moscow). Moscow: Moskovskiy Rabochiy, 1947.
