= Monuments to Herzen and Ogaryov on Mokhovaya Street =

- Памятники Герцену и Огарёву на Моховой улице
- Interactive map of Monuments to Herzen and Ogaryov on Mokhovaya Street
- Location: Moscow, Mokhovaya Street, 11
- Designer: V. D. Kokorin

The Monuments to Herzen and Ogaryov on Mokhovaya Street (Russian: Памятники Герцену и Огарёву на Моховой улице) were installed in Moscow on Mokhovaya Street in front of the old building of Moscow State University (Mokhovaya Street, 11) and form a single ensemble.

They commemorate the author and revolutionary Alexander Herzen and the poet and political activist Nikolay Ogaryov, and were opened in 1922. The authors of the monuments are the sculptor Nikolay Andreyev and the architect V. D. Kokorin.

== History ==
In August 1919 the sculptor Nikolay Andreyev was commissioned to make a monument to the democrat, philosopher and publicist Alexander Herzen on the occasion of the 50th anniversary of his death. This monument was supposed to be set January 20, 1920 in front of the building of Moscow State University. Since the monument was originally planned to be installed on the site of the recently restored grid, the People's Commissariat of Education opposed this. Then Andreyev suggested making two monuments - to Herzen and Ogaryov, by placing them in the depths of the square on both sides of the entrance. The time allotted to work was very tight, Andreyev attracted his brother, the sculptor V. A. Andreyev, to help. However, even the two of them failed to meet the deadline, and in January 1920, only the laying of monuments took place. The monuments were discovered only on December 10, 1922 within the framework of the Leninist plan of monumental propaganda.

== Description ==
The monuments are made of concrete with marble chips. A. I. Herzen is depicted standing full-length with arms crossed on his chest. On his right shoulder he has a cloak, which falls with decorative folds. N. P. Ogarev is depicted full-length with a winglet, thrown over a bent right hand.

== Other monuments to Herzen and Ogaryov in Moscow ==
In addition to this paired monument, in Moscow there is a later monument to Herzen on Tverskoy Boulevard, as well as a monument to the oath of Herzen and Ogaryov on Sparrow Hills.

== Gallery ==
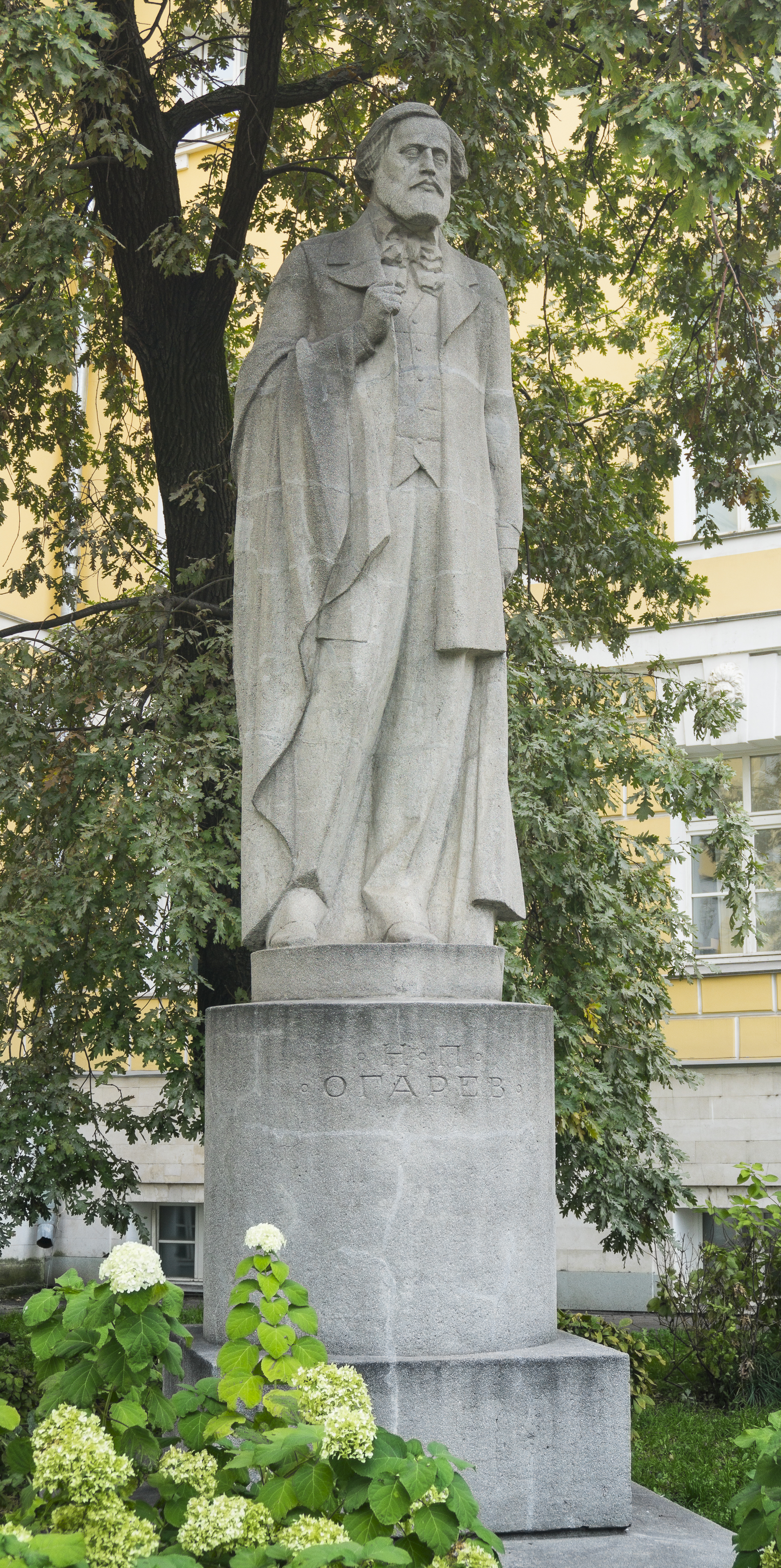
N. O. Ogaryov monument

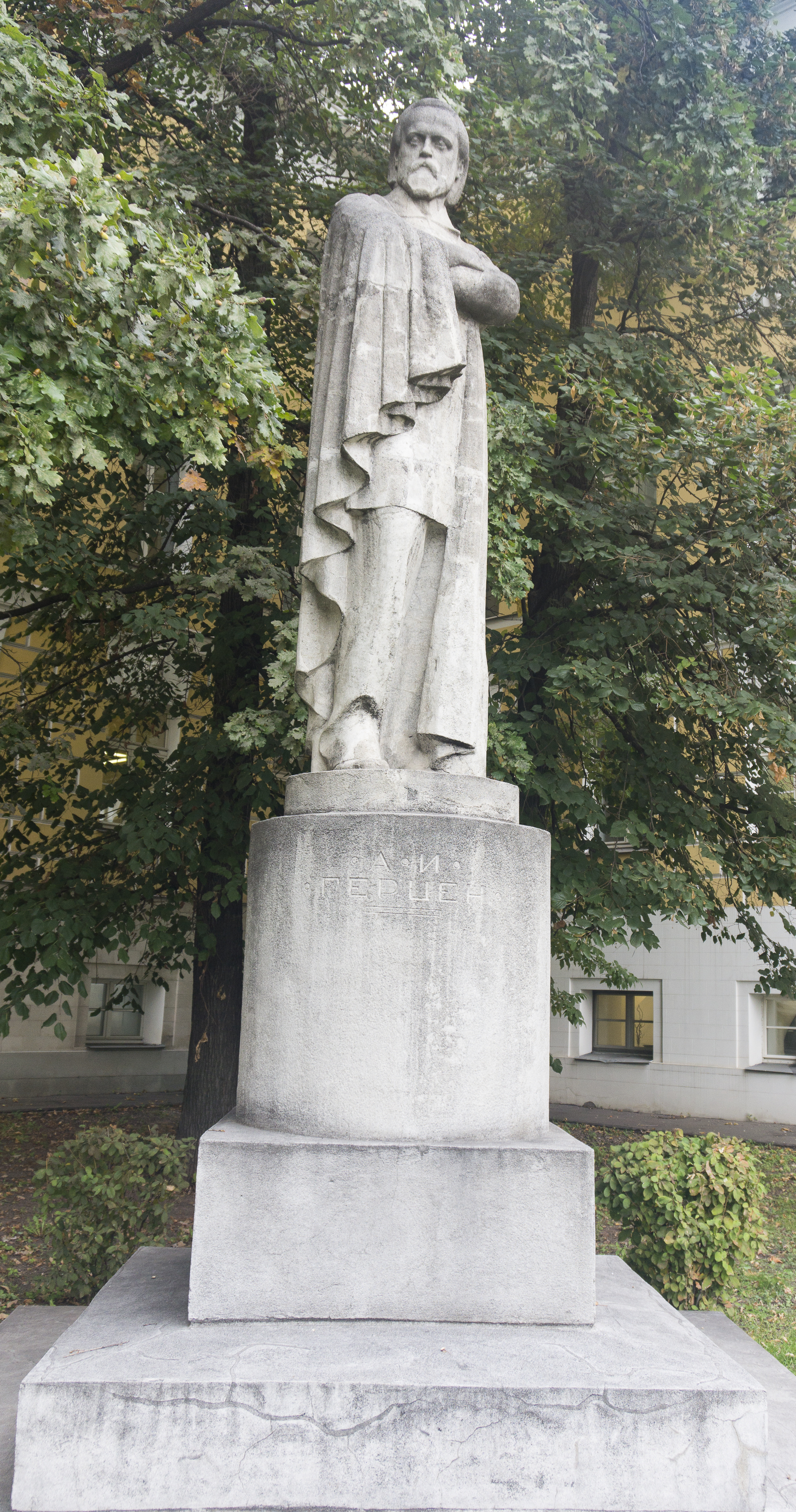
A. I. Herzen monument
