= Robespierre Monument =

Monument in Moscow unveiled in 1918

- Памятник Робеспьеру
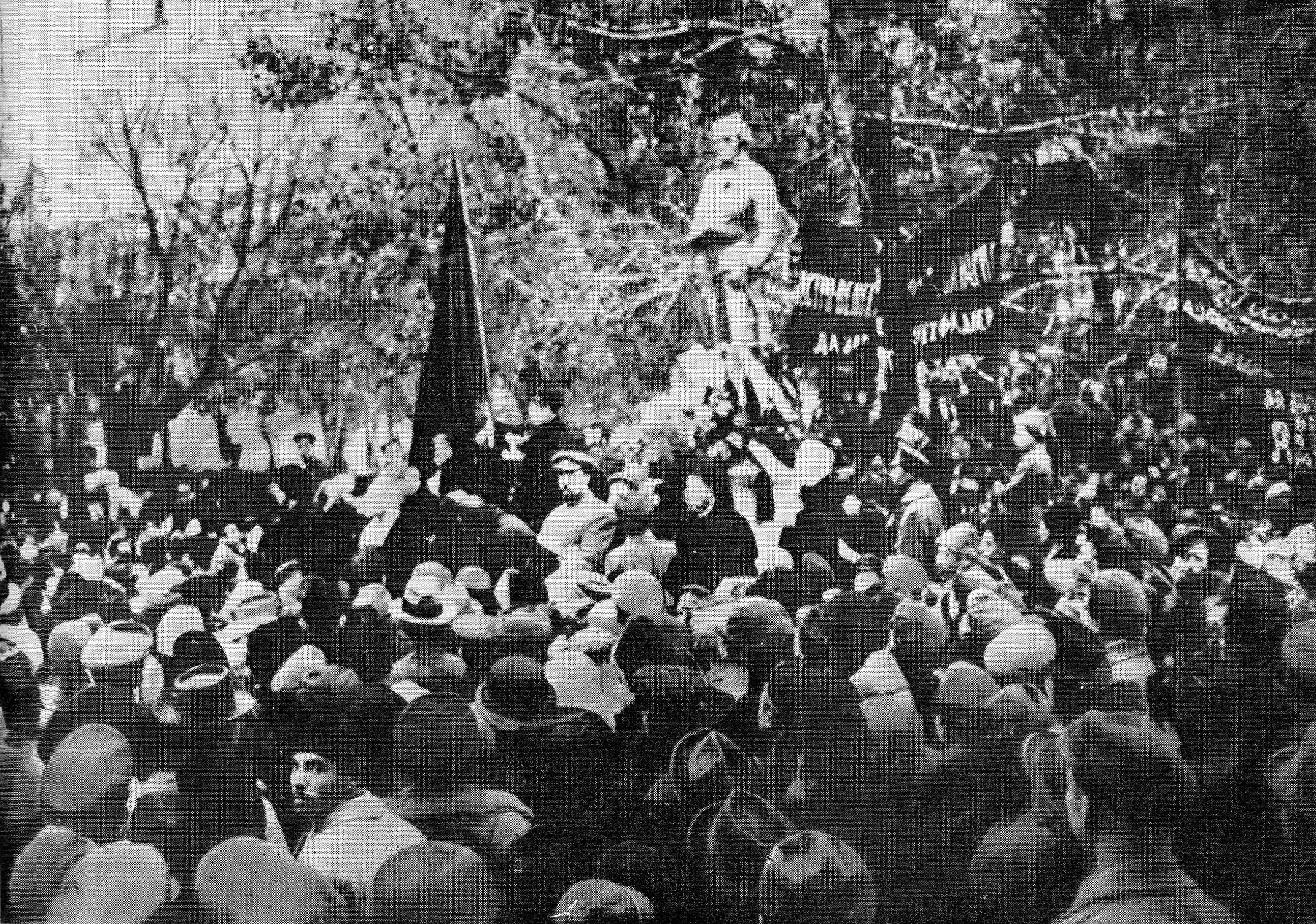
- The Robespierre Monument being unveiled on 3 November 1918, three days prior to its destruction
- Interactive map of Robespierre Monument
- Location: Moscow
- Coordinates: 55.7537°N 37.6149°E
- Designer: Beatrice Yuryevna Sandomierz
- Type: Monument
- Material: Concrete
- Opening date: 3 November 1918
- Dedicated to: Maximilien de Robespierre
- Dismantled date: 7 November 1918

The Robespierre Monument (Russian: Памятник Робеспьеру, romanized: Pamyatnik Robyesp'yeru) was one of the first monuments erected in the Russian Soviet Federative Socialist Republic (later part of the Soviet Union), raised in Moscow on 3 November 1918 – just ahead of the first anniversary of the October Revolution, which had brought the Bolsheviks to power. It depicted Maximilien de Robespierre, a prominent figure of the French Revolution. Located in Alexander Garden, it had been designed by the sculptor Beatrice Yuryevna Sandomierz (Russian: Беатриса Юрьевна Сандомирская, romanized: Beatrica Yur'yevna Sandomirskaya). Created as part of the "monumental propaganda" plan, the monument was commissioned by Vladimir Lenin, who in an edict referred to Robespierre as a "Bolshevik avant la lettre". It was only one of several planned statues depicting French revolutionaries – others were to be made of Georges Danton, François-Noël Babeuf and Jean-Paul Marat, although only the one of Danton was never completed.

Created in the context of the ongoing Russian Civil War and with the country in a state of war communism, there were few materials available to make the statue. Lacking bronze or marble, the monument was instead constructed using concrete, with hollow pipes running through it. This design proved frail, lasting only a few days. On the morning of 7 November only a pile of rubble remained. Over the following days different newspapers supplied varying versions as to why it collapsed, with Znamya Trudovoi Kommuny and others saying it was the work of "criminal" (counter-revolutionary) hands, some assumed White Guard saboteur exploded it with a grenade, and Izvestia stating the statue's demise was caused by improper construction.

== See also ==
- History of Moscow
- Reign of Terror
- Soviet art
