= Vasily Timiryazev =

19th-century Russian literary figure, journalist, theatre critic, and translator

Vasily Arkadyevich Timiryazev
- Василий Аркадьевич Тимирязев
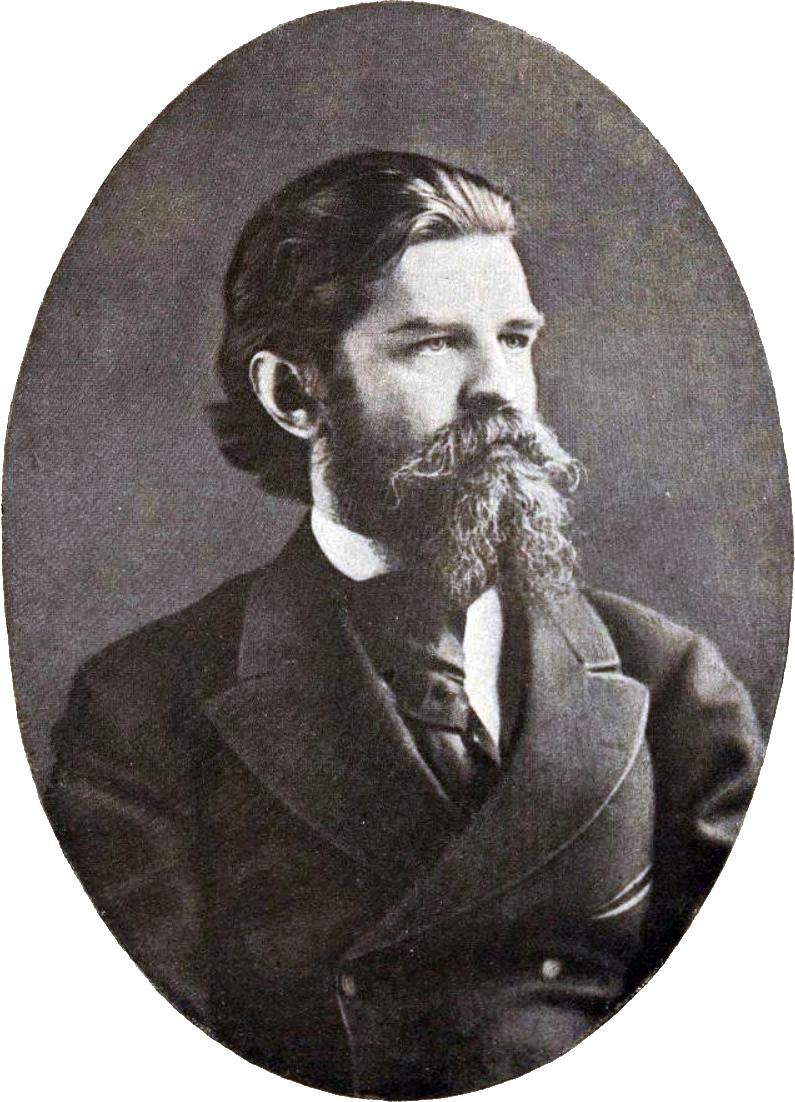
- Born: 18 March 1841; Saint Petersburg, Russian Empire
- Died: 27 August 1912 (aged 71) (14); Mustamäki, Vyborg Governorate, Grand Duchy of Finland, Russian Empire
- Occupations: Journalist of the Russian Empire, translator of the Russian Empire, theatre critic
- Writing career
- Pen name: B. M. S.; V. A. T.; V. T.; T. I. M.
- Language: Russian
- Period: 1870–1900

Vasily Arkadyevich Timiryazev (18 March 1841, Saint Petersburg — 27 August 1912, Mustamäki) was a Russian literary figure, journalist, theatre critic, and polyglot translator. He translated works of Charles Dickens (The Mystery of Edwin Drood and others), Walter Scott (The Heart of Midlothian and others), William Makepeace Thackeray (The Book of Snobs and others), Bret Harte (Gabriel Conroy and others), Émile Zola (The Fortune of the Rougons and others), George Sand (Valentine), Bjørnstjerne Bjørnson, John Stuart Mill, among others.

He was a brother of Kliment, Nikolai, and Dmitry Timiryazev, and was particularly close to his younger brother Kliment Arkadyevich. In their youth, they were united by studies at the Saint Petersburg Imperial University, participation in the 1861 student unrest, rejection of Russia's autocratic system, as well as translation activities, interest in English literature, and work for the journal Otechestvennye Zapiski.

He was an honorary justice of the peace in Saint Petersburg, a member of the Mutual Aid Society of Russian Writers, a contributor to the journals Otechestvennye Zapiski and Delo, where he published translations of new European literature and compilations from the works of the most prominent representatives of European social thought. A 1860s liberal by conviction, his talent as a journalist and translator was appreciated by M. E. Saltykov-Shchedrin.

Later, he shared the principles of parliamentarism and became a regular contributor to the journal Istorichesky Vestnik, where he maintained regular columns such as Foreign Historical News and Trifles, Foreigners about Russia, and Russians about Foreigners. In addition to the mentioned publications, he appeared in numerous other Saint Petersburg newspapers and journals, but his name remained unknown to the wider public, overshadowed by the fame of his renowned scientist brother. He rarely signed his articles with his full name, or not at all, or only with initials.

Timiryazev was the biographer of the baronial de Bode family. During the Russo-Turkish War (1877–1878), he served as a war correspondent in the Balkans. A youthful friend of N. S. Leskov. The name V. A. Timiryazev is mentioned in Leskov's story The Lady and the Fefyola (1894). In the 1890s, the editorial board of the journal Vestnik Inostrannoy Literatury published his translations of English and French classics in the series "Collected Works of Selected Foreign Writers". Some of his literary translations were published in the USSR and continue to be reprinted to the present day.

== Early life and education ==
Vasily Timiryazev was born 6 March 1841 in Saint Petersburg to the head of the Saint Petersburg customs district, Arkady Semyonovich Timiryazev, and his second wife (married 9 November 1830) Adelaida Klementyevna, née Baroness de Bode, daughter of a lieutenant colonel. The noble Timiryazev family was known from pre-Petrine times. Besides Vasily, the family included older daughters Maria and Olga, and brothers Alexander and Ivan — from the father's first marriage to Maria Vasilyevna Protasova. From the second marriage to Adelaida Klementyevna were born Zakhary (born 4 September 1831), Nikolai (born 3 August 1835), Dmitry (born 8 June 1837), Vasily, and Kliment (born 22 May 1843).

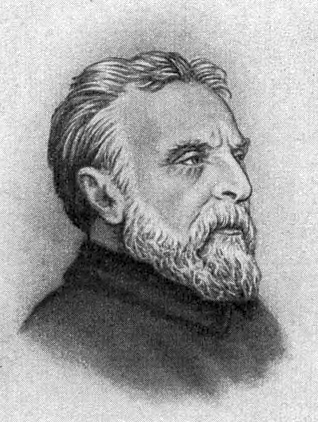
Arkady Semionovich Timiryazev

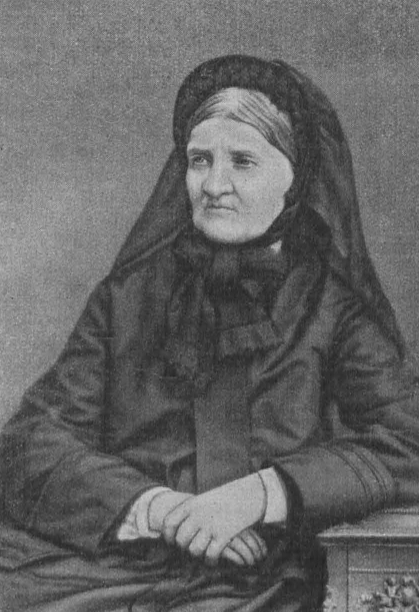
Adelaida Klimentievna Timiryazeva

Additionally, Vasily was a first cousin to the Saratov governor F. I. Timiryazev and nephew to the Astrakhan governor I. S. Timiryazev. His nephews were the physicist A. K. Timiryazev and the Minister of Trade and Industry V. I. Timiryazev. The Timiryazev family was noble but impoverished, as with the accession of the new sovereign Alexander II in 1855, Vasily's father was retired, and his large family had to live on a modest pension. At the same time, Arkady Semyonovich adhered to firm republican principles and raised his children in the same spirit. The younger children received home education and early became accustomed to earning their living through their own labor. However, in preparation for university entrance exams, in addition to their mother, the brothers were assisted by their home tutor Ovchinnikov. On 19 July 1860, Vasily and Kliment submitted petitions for admission to examinations at Saint Petersburg University.

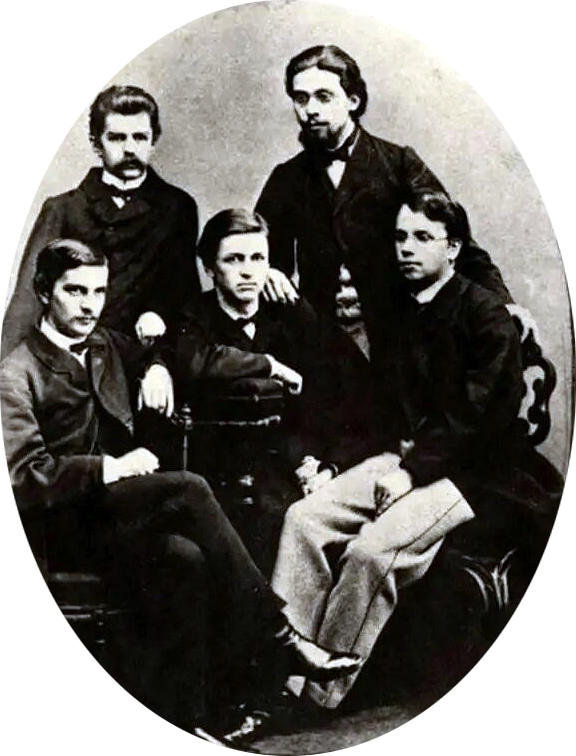
Vasily top left and Kliment bottom left with students of Saint Petersburg University, 1864

== Studies at Saint Petersburg University ==
External image
- Conversation of the police officer with the Timiryazev brothers. Drawing by Evgeny Krzhizhanovsky from the book by M. E. Ivin "At the Threshold of a Great Mystery". Leningrad, Detgiz, 1961

Following their father's wish, both brothers enrolled on 15 September in the Faculty of Law in the cameral sciences division. (Note: In some biographies of the Timiryazev brothers and in older encyclopedias, the date of their entry into Saint Petersburg University is given as 1861, but B. E. Raikov established that both brothers entered a year earlier. Vasily was 19 and Kliment 17 at the time of entry.) Kliment transferred to the Faculty of Physics and Mathematics in his first year, studying natural sciences until graduation. In autumn 1861, in their second year, Vasily and Kliment were expelled for participation in student unrest, because of a directive from the new Minister of Public Education E. V. Putiatin, requiring all students to sign matriculation books of a new format containing disciplinary rules: not to participate in university public life, not to organize meetings, a library, or fund, not to attend lectures of other faculties, etc. By signing, a student undertook to follow the new strict rules, contrary to the unwritten laws of student freedom.

Some students were forced to sign, but Vasily and Kliment chose the path of "non-matriculated" students — those who refused to sign the document. On this occasion, a police officer visited the apartment of the rebellious young men, "first with flattery, then with threats urging them to return to the university, but in vain". 320 students of Saint Petersburg University refused to sign, and were arrested from 12 October to 6 December 1861. But since Vasily and Kliment's parents lived in Saint Petersburg with their sons, the police authorities required their father Arkady Semyonovich to provide surety for them, which he did. The matter ended there, and the Timiryazev brothers avoided arrest in the Kronstadt Naval Hospital, unlike other protesters.

Vasily continued his studies as an auditor only two years later, in spring 1864 (Kliment, who also refused regular student status, resumed studies six months earlier), and completed them around 1866. After his father's death in 1867, Vasily lived with his mother in Saint Petersburg, in the parental home at Sergiyevskaya Street, house 5.

== Vocation choice ==
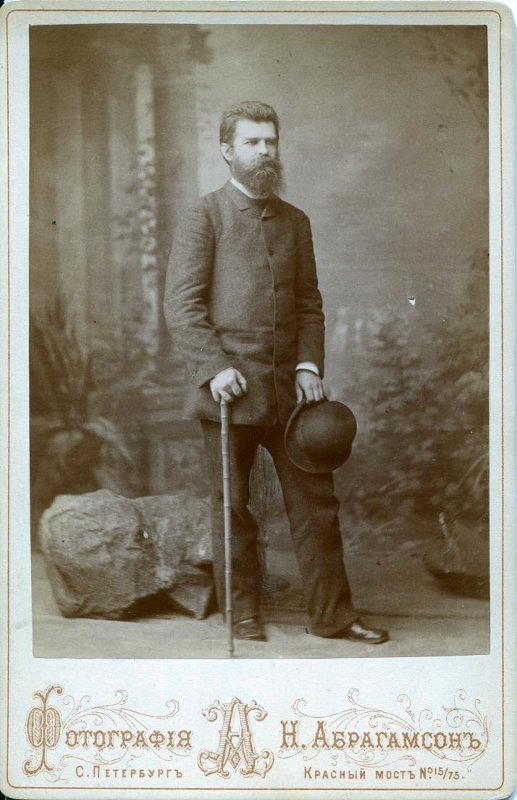
Photograph of V. A. Timiryazev from the archive of A. F. Koni, 1870s

V. A. Timiryazev initially planned to become a professional literary figure and devote his life to journalism, but later postponed this decision. For the rest of his life until retirement, Vasily Arkadyevich served as a Saint Petersburg justice of the peace; according to a contemporary, "Timiryazev, honorary justice of the peace—one of the oldest and most righteous in Saint Petersburg. Stern, passionate, and wayward, but 'mute before the law', with which he is armed from head to toe". However, official service could not fulfill all his aspirations. He shared a typical 1860s liberal-mindset, adherent of ideas promoted by the journal Sovremennik and its radical authors, sharing revolutionary views on Russian society in the 1860s. It was no coincidence that he linked his fate with the most freethinking journals of the time—Otechestvennye Zapiski and Delo, where he published literary translations from European languages and articles on literature, history, and public life. He was particularly close to the interests of Otechestvennye Zapiski, edited at the time by N. A. Nekrasov.

V. A. Timiryazev's translations from English, German, French, Norwegian, and Danish are well-known. His younger brother Kliment also earned money translating from English. His articles on Garibaldi and Darwin appeared in Otechestvennye Zapiski in the first half of the 1860s, before Nekrasov and M. E. Saltykov-Shchedrin joined the editorial board, when the brothers used to be students. Their mother Adelaida Klementyevna taught them languages. Researcher I. M. Katarsky suggested that the brothers may have translated Charles Dickens's Great Expectations together.

According to V. Ya. Fet, the Timiryazev family, thanks to Adelaida Klementyevna having a more Protestant than Orthodox lifestyle, may have maintained close ties with Britons living in Saint Petersburg. Thus, writer and Anglican priest Lewis Carroll in March 1871 asked Alexander MacMillan, owner of the London publishing house Macmillan Publishers, to send French and German translations of Alice's Adventures in Wonderland to the priest of the Anglican church in Saint Petersburg, G. S. Thompson. Carroll intended the books for a certain "Miss Timiryazef": "She is the lady who, I believe, is going to translate Alice into Russian".

The reason of why an English translator needed French and German versions of Alice, and whether Macmillan's editions reached Saint Petersburg, remains unclear. The only Russian translation of Alice's Adventures in Wonderland published during Lewis Carroll's lifetime appeared in Moscow in 1879 (A. I. Mamontov printing house, 166 pp.). Titled Sonya in the Kingdom of Wonder, all fairy tale characters had Russian names, and the text was shorter than the original. The anonymous translation is attributed either to Olga Ivanovna Timiryazeva, Vasily Arkadyevich's cousin, or, more likely, to Ekaterina Ivanovna Timiryazeva (1848—1921). Ekaterina was Vasily's niece — sister of the future Minister of Trade V. I. Timiryazev; from age ten she lived in their home and learned English from grandmother Adelaida Klementyevna. In 1871, she married L. A. Baratynsky and later became known as translator of children's literature E. I. Baratynskaya, collaborating with the Tolstoyan publishing house Posrednik of I. I. Gorbunov-Posadov.

== Work in Otechestvennye Zapiski ==
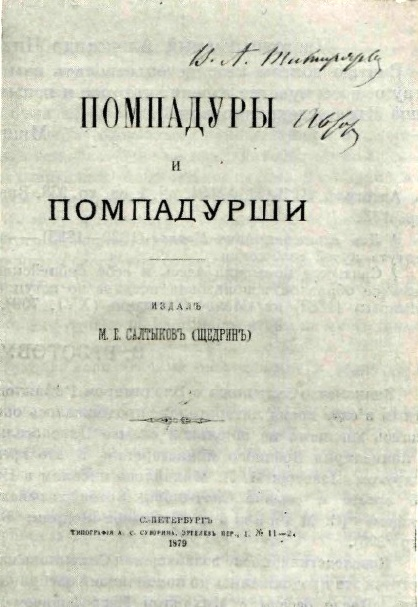
M. E. Saltykov-Shchedrin's autograph to V. A. Timiryazev on the book The Pompadours, A. S. Suvorin edition, 1879

The earliest mention of V. A. Timiryazev's name in the honorarium records of Otechestvennye Zapiski dates to 1871. The young contributor received payment for his translation from English of the anonymous "politico-satirical story" Ginx's Baby: His Birth and Other Misfortunes. The actual author was the English writer Edward Jenkins, whom V. A. Timiryazev translated in subsequent years, though in 1871 the author's name was still unknown to him. In the preface to the story —actually a novel— V. A. Timiryazev noted that in just a few months Ginx's Baby had been reprinted seven times in Great Britain and enjoyed great success among readers. "Critics recognized it as the best political satire in English since Swift, but vainly tried to guess the author's name, which he has kept secret to this day, though all journalists agree it is one of the known political and economic writers..." Two years later, N. P. Ogarev in Geneva read the Otechestvennye Zapiski translation and in a letter to A. A. Hertzen, son of the late A. I. Hertzen, praised both the novel and the translation: "Have you read the English novel Djinks Child (1871). I have it in Russian translation. It's delightful. Get the original. The author's name is not given".

The journal employed several translators, including several from English: M. K. Tsebrikova, Marko Vovchok, D. L. Mikhalovsky, N. S. Kuteynikov, and others. However, V. A. Timiryazev became the main translator for Otechestvennye Zapiski. His work there lasted from 1871 to 1883. During the Russo-Turkish War of 1877–1878, V. A. Timiryazev was a war correspondent for Otechestvennye Zapiski in the Balkans. (Note: Commentator of V. G. Korolenko, B. D. Letov, also called Vasily Timiryazev a foreign correspondent for the journal Russkoye Bogatstvo, regularly reporting on major events in world politics and contradictions in public life in Great Britain, France, and Germany.) However, B. B. Glinsky reported that Vasily Arkadyevich wrote his foreign reviews without leaving Saint Petersburg Governorate, using the editorial foreign press. For example, the anonymous article "Bosnia and Herzegovina during the Uprising" in Otechestvennye Zapiski in 1876 was written by V. A. Timiryazev based on the book by English historian Arthur Evans (Through Bosnia and the Herzegovina on Foot during the Insurrection, August and September 1875. London, 1876). Indirect confirmation that V. A. Timiryazev wrote his foreign reviews in Saint Petersburg is that after finishing work for Russkoye Bogatstvo in 1894, he moved to another Saint Petersburg populist journal Novoye Slovo, collaborating from 1895 to 1897. During this time, Vasily Arkadyevich participated in weekly editorial meetings of Novoye Slovo until its publisher O. N. Popova sold it to the legal Marxists in March 1897. Nekrasov's right hand in the journal was M. E. Saltykov-Shchedrin. After Nekrasov's death, he became editor of Otechestvennye Zapiski. Mikhail Evgrafovich was the person who shaped Vasily Arkadyevich's convictions from youth. He gave V. A. Timiryazev the entire foreign fiction depa

rtment, which under the conditions of the time had to be primarily "ideological", expressing the active democratic tendency of this populist publication. Besides translations, V. A. Timiryazev handled compilations in the editorial office.

In Saltykov-Shchedrin's editorial correspondence of the 1880s, V. A. Timiryazev's name as translator appears repeatedly, often with irritation at the contributor's unreliability in delivering articles and translations on time, particularly Bjørnson and His Novels and the translation of Henry Lucy's novel Gideon Fleece. Nevertheless, M. E. Saltykov-Shchedrin highly valued V. A. Timiryazev. A copy of Saltykov-Shchedrin's book The Pompadours is preserved in RGALI Saint Petersburg, 1879, and has the writer's inscription "To V. A. Timiryazev from the author".

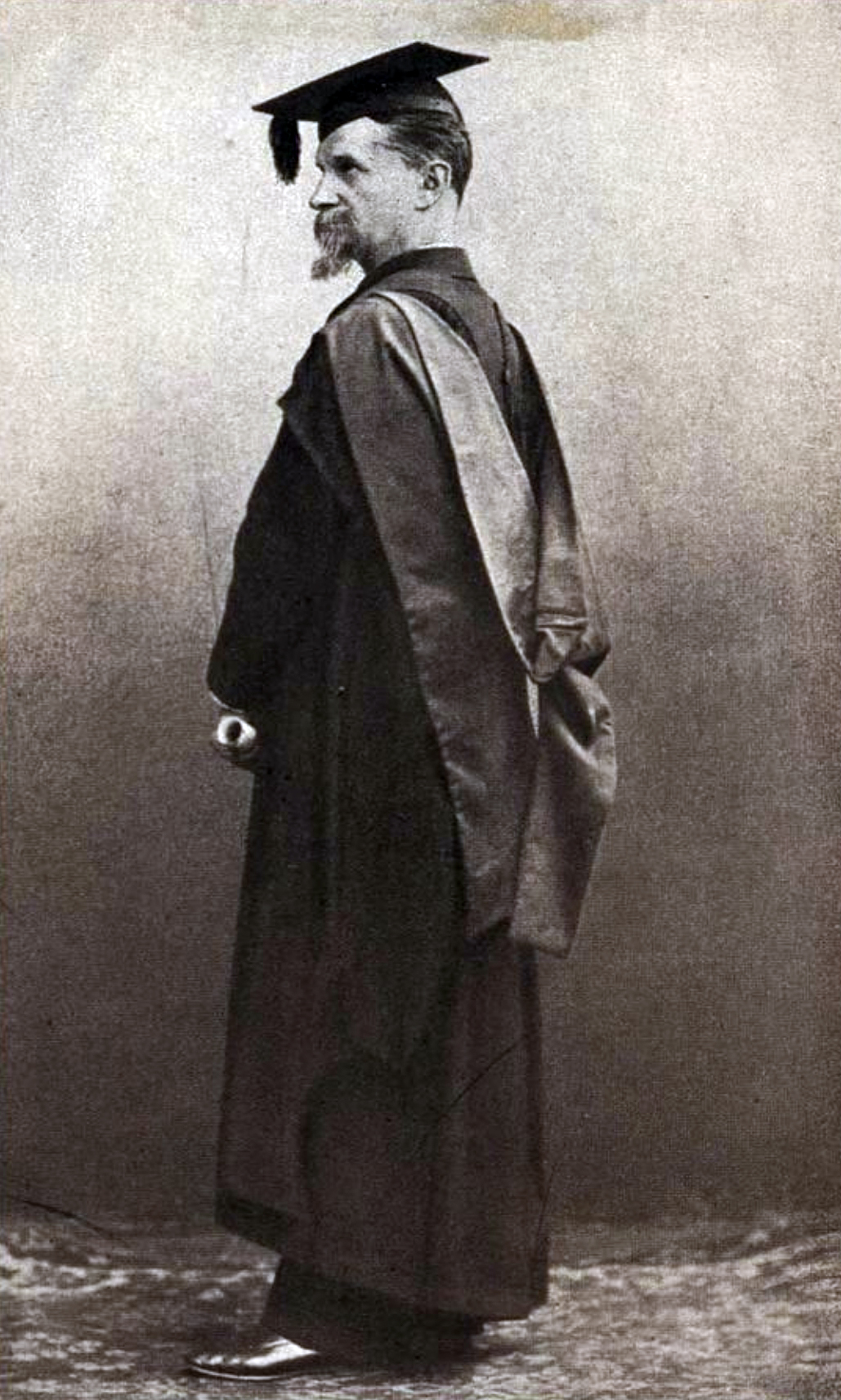
The younger brother, like Vasily, was an Anglophile. K. A. Timiryazev in the robe of honorary doctor of the University of Glasgow, 1902

After the assassination of Emperor Alexander II by Narodnaya Volya members, voluntary informants from the secret monarchist organization Sacred Druzhina, wishing to compromise the chief editor of Otechestvennye Zapiski for connections with socialists, in the List of Major Agent Investigations of Voluntary Guard dated 5 April 1882 informed the Saint Petersburg Department of Police that at the home of a certain Matveev on Nadezhdinskaya Street, house No. 18, apt. 4 [address of the Otechestvennye Zapiski editorial office] <…>, weekly gatherings occur chaired by Actual State Councillor Mikhail Evgrafovich Saltykov (pseud. Shchedrin). Known attendees: Mikhaylovsky, Pleshcheyev, Skabichevsky, and justice of the peace Timiryazev.

After the death of I. S. Turgenev and just a month after completing publication of the novel Gideon Fleece, M. E. Saltykov-Shchedrin, forgetting past editorial frictions with his contributor, wrote to V. P. Gayevsky on 27 August 1883: "Dear Viktor Pavlovich, as agreed, I send herewith the list of Otechestvennye Zapiski contributors wishing tickets to Turgenev's funeral. All are undoubted literary figures with full right to attend". Among the names of regular contributors was V. A. Timiryazev.

The left-radical and revolutionary part of Russian society, amid the reaction of the 1880s, planned to turn Turgenev's funeral into a major political demonstration. The younger brothers Vasily and Kliment were close, though outwardly different, but shared similar characters. Throughout life they held similar political convictions. Moreover, Vasily influenced his younger brother, passionately writing to Kliment in Moscow about the upcoming mourning events in Saint Petersburg: "Come without fail... so many vile things are being done over these funerals that every decent person must attend... If successful, we'll arrange such a triumph — let the scoundrels know. Already 250 delegations and wreaths... If you don't come, you'll be ashamed." Vasily did not have to persuade long: Kliment Arkadyevich came from Moscow and attended as representative of the Petrovskaya Agricultural Academy. Vasily carried the wreath from Otechestvennye Zapiski.

V. A. Timiryazev's name appears briefly in N. S. Leskov's story The Lady and the Fefyola (1894), describing events of the 1860s–1870s. Leskov calls V. A. Timiryazev one of his literary friends of that era: "I went with another literary comrade, now deceased (of our company then, only three remain alive: Timiryazev, Vsev. Krestovsky, and I)". The true nature of their relationship is hard to establish, as the story, subtitled "From Literary Memoirs", is, according to the writer's son A. N. Leskov, "least of all memoir-like". Maya Kucherskaya clarified that the circle close to the Otechestvennye Zapiski editorial board under S. S. Dudyshkin included, besides Leskov, V. A. Timiryazev, V. V. Krestovsky, N. I. Solovyov, E. F. Zarin, and L. N. Maykov, though academician L. N. Maykov was still alive when Leskov wrote the story.

== Work in Istorichesky Vestnik ==
After the banning of Otechestvennye Zapiski and closure of Delo in 1884, V. A. Timiryazev collaborated to many publications, most intensively to S. N. Shubinsky's journal Istorichesky Vestnik (1880—1917). Eventually, Vasily Arkadyevich retired from service and dedicated himself to literature. Journalist B. B. Glinsky, later editor of Istorichesky Vestnik, in his obituary recalled that Timiryazev was an outstanding worker, highly educated, perfectly mastering European languages. This was appreciated by editor S. N. Shubinsky, who invited the former Otechestvennye Zapiski journalist to maintain the regular column "Foreign Historical News", previously handled by veteran journalist Vladimir Rafailovich Zotov, who died in 1896. V. A. Timiryazev accepted. The column was monthly, anonymous, and under Timiryazev became "Foreign Historical News and Trifles".

The entry of a 1860s liberal into the conservative Istorichesky Vestnik editorial board noticeably enlivened the journal. Publisher A. S. Suvorin claimed that "Foreign Historical News and Trifles" was the most interesting department in all Russian journalism: "I read the bibliography and trifles section first. Sometimes Timiryazev radicalizes. That's transient. But how well he captures the flow of European thought". B. B. Glinsky in his obituary spared no vivid colors describing the deceased's character and appearance. Eternally disheveled and sloppily dressed, hurrying somewhere, Timiryazev was equally magnificent at lavish dinners of liberal Vestnik Evropy editor M. M. Stasyulevich at the Saint Petersburg restaurant Domon, and in the office of Istorichesky Vestnik editor S. N. Shubinsky, especially the latter.

The correct, restrained S. N. <Shubinsky> sits in a robe at his desk, while Timiryazev runs around the office, waving his arms, trying to convert the editor of Istorichesky Vestnik to his radical faith. Shubinsky looks ironically at his contributor, finally interrupts: "I'll ring now and call the yardman. They'll take you to the police station and lock you up. I'll suffer because of you." V. A. <Timiryazev> is stunned at first, then bursts into good-natured laughter, rushing to embrace his cheerful editor. (B. B. Glinsky, Timiryazev, V. A., Istorichesky Vestnik, 1912, September, pp. 1129—1130.)

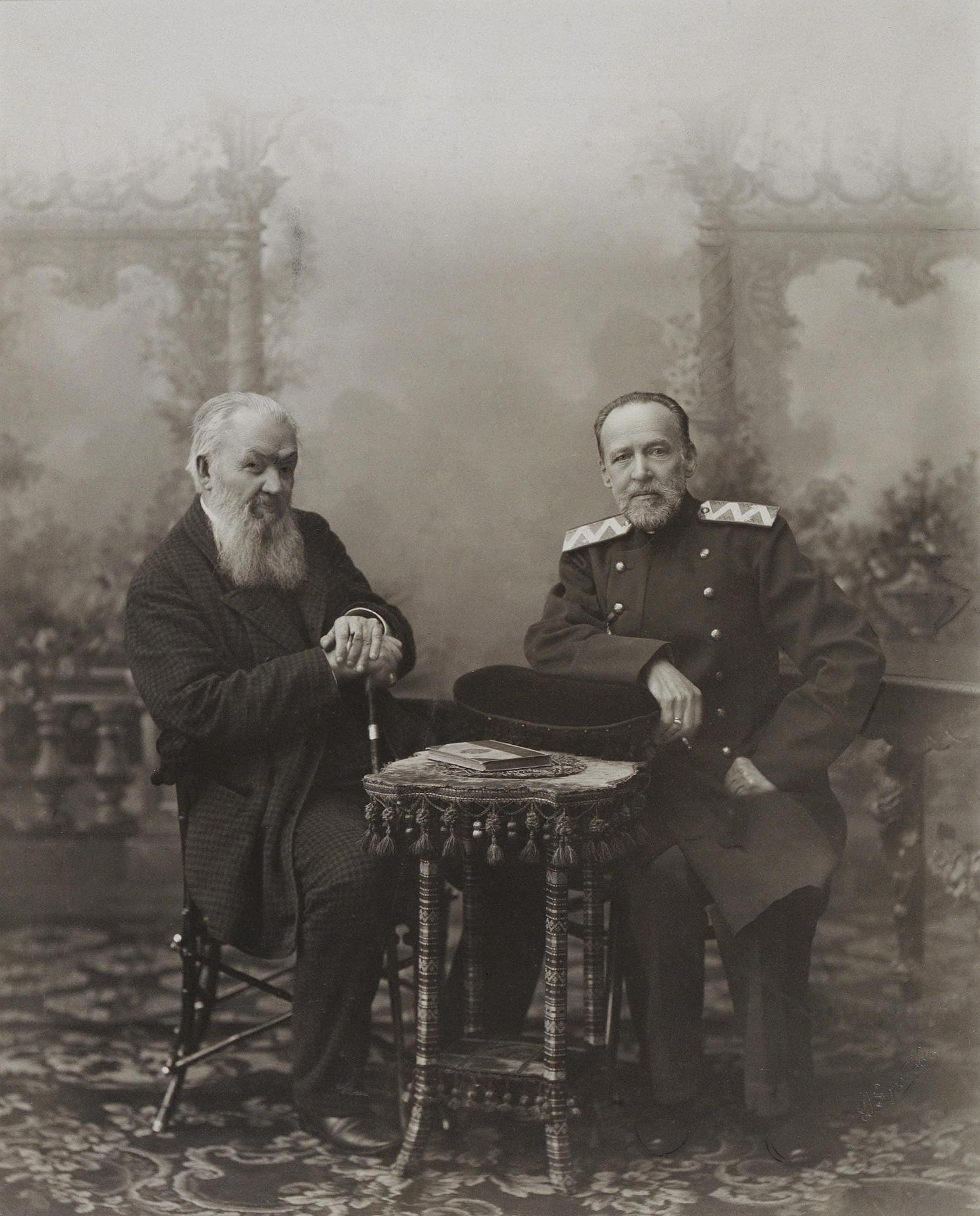
A. S. Suvorin left and S. N. Shubinsky right

Glinsky returned to this episode two and a half years later as editor of Istorichesky Vestnik, after Shubinsky's death. He attributed the emotional outburst to either a "reactionary" article in the journal from the liberal journalist's view, or the editor's reluctance to speak publicly on a topical issue.

According to Glinsky, perpetually entangled in money matters, V. A. Timiryazev caused much trouble to the punctual honorarium-payer S. N. Shubinsky, driving him to despair over his contributor's financial disarray. One example was that former radical journalism colleagues who returned from Siberian exile, S. N. Krivenko (Otechestvennye Zapiski) and K. M. Staniukovich (writer and Delo editor), united in the 1890s in the populist journal Russkoye Bogatstvo, invited Vasily Arkadyevich to the newspaper Syn Otechestva, acquired from S. E. Dobrodeev. In this newspaper, Vasily was assigned the foreign policy department out of old memory. But the liberal idea of former 1860s men under the harsh conditions of the 1890 censorship statute failed, and their collaboration lasted briefly (1897—1898), leaving V. A. Timiryazev with only Istorichesky Vestnik. (Note: V. A. Timiryazev's collaboration with the Journal of the Ministry of Transport, particularly the free supplement "Vestnik of the Ministry of Transport" in 1896—1900, is presumed, as the editor there could have been his nephew V. I. Timiryazev.)

In 1915, as editor, B. B. Glinsky in the article Istorichesky Vestnik over 35 Years again recalled V. A. Timiryazev and other colleagues. He wrote that Istorichesky Vestnik presents readers face to face not only with phenomena and figures of national life but also Western European, with active assistants V. R. Zotov, E. M. Garshin, A. I. Kirpichnikov, V. A. Timiryazev. Then the editor noted contributors to Historical News and Trifles: the mentioned E. M. Garshin, V. R. Zotov, V. A. Timiryazev, as well as unmentioned F. I. Bulgakov, A. M. Lovyagin, A. M. Belov, and Vasily Arkadyevich's widow E. S. Timiryazeva. Finally, Glinsky drew attention to the column "Foreigners about Russia", a kind of "Rossica" (with a counterpart "Russians about Foreigners"). The first provided compilations from serious works of European scholars on intersections of European and Russian history and life of the Russian Empire. Most fruitfully here worked V. A. Timiryazev, V. I. von Stein, and A. M. Belov.

== Death and posthumous fate ==
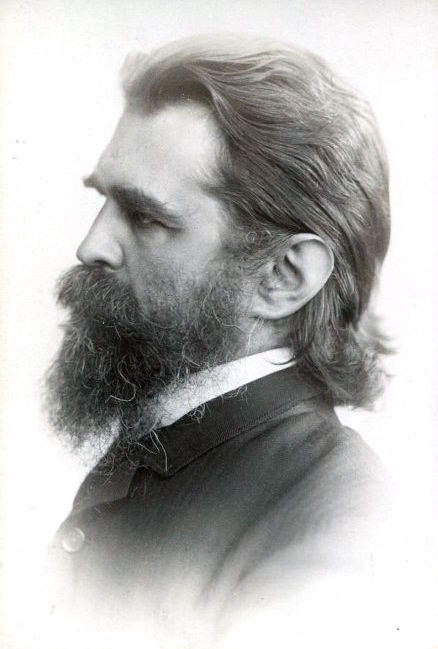
V. A. Timiryazev, 1870s–1880s

Vasily Arkadyevich actively contributed to Saint Petersburg press, working as translator and theatre critic. Besides the mentioned Otechestvennye Zapiski, Delo (1873—1876 and 1879—1880), and Istorichesky Vestnik, he appeared in Saint Petersburg journals Slovo, Zhivopisnoye Obozreniye, Severny Vestnik (1889—1891), Russkoye Bogatstvo, Novoye Slovo, Niva, newspapers Nedelya, Sanks Peterburgskiye Vedomosti, Novosti, Golos, Molva, Russkaya Zhizn. V. A. Timiryazev was a member of the Mutual Aid Society of Russian Writers and its aid fund.

Vasily Arkadyevich died on 14 August 1912. Buried at the cemetery in Uusikirkko. According to the obituary author, the cause was news of A. S. Suvorin's death on 11 August 1912 in Tsarskoye Selo. The Istorichesky Vestnik editorial learned this on 15 August from Vasily Arkadyevich's widow Ekaterina Sergeyevna Timiryazeva. According to her, the death of the publisher of Novoye Vremya and Istorichesky Vestnik deeply shocked her husband. Reading the news, he gasped: "What grief, what a loss!" Then followed agony lasting a day. V. A. Timiryazev died three days after Suvorin.

B. B. Glinsky wrote that Vasily Timiryazev's name paled before his famous naturalist brother's, few knew him, as he signed articles mostly with initials V. T. or V. A. T. In Soviet times, he was mentioned by biographers and commentators of K. A. Timiryazev, M. E. Saltykov-Shchedrin, N. A. Nekrasov, and N. S. Leskov, bibliographers I. F. Masanov and Yu. I. Masanov (Dictionary of Pseudonyms), V. E. Bograd, and S. S. Borshchevsky (contents indexes of Otechestvennye Zapiski). In post-Soviet times, his biography began to fade. Thus, biographer of the Timiryazev dynasty Aleksey Andreyevich Druchok erroneously believed Vasily Arkadyevich died in 1899, when in fact his first wife Adelaida Borisovna Danzas died on 30 January 1899, and he remarried. Compilers of Historical Cemeteries of Saint Petersburg A. V. Kobak and Yu. M. Pirutko confused Vasily Arkadyevich with his nephew Vasily Ivanovich Timiryazev — imperial official and future minister. Confusion arose from the Agent's Report on Saltykov's Funeral published in Byloye in 1906. Timiryazev's initials were not given. The anonymous Department of Police agent reported from M. E. Saltykov-Shchedrin's funeral: "Speeches by Orest Miller and Timiryazev were somewhat tendentious".

== Personal life ==
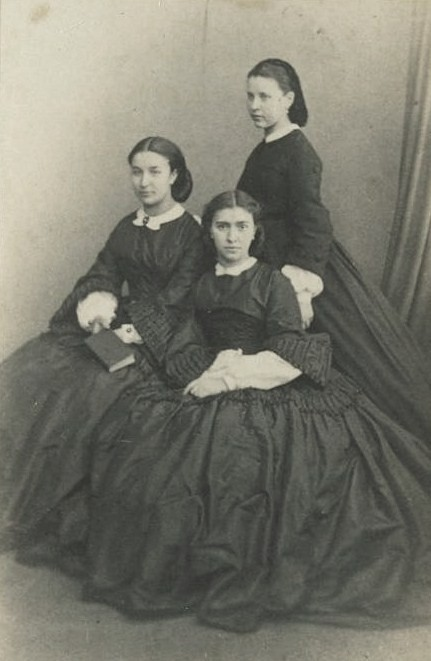
Adelaida Danzas left, Olga Danzas center (married to Vasily's cousin Alexander Ivanovich Timiryazev), Tatiana Danzas right. 1861

Vasily Arkadyevich married Aglaida (Adel, Adelaida) Borisovna Danzas (6 May 1839 — 30 January 1899), daughter of Boris Danzas and niece of Konstantin Danzas, comrade of A. S. Pushkin at the Imperial Lyceum at Tsarskoye Selo on 24 July 1878. The couple lived on the Vyborg Side at Bolshoy Sampsonievsky Prospect, house 22. They had a daughter Tamara. Widowed at sixty-three, Vasily Arkadyevich married on 9 July 1904 the forty-year-old merchant's widow Ekaterina Sergeyevna Guskova (born 1864). The couple lived in the dacha settlement Mustamäki, where V. A. Timiryazev pursued literary work. In later life, paralysis affected half his body, rendering him immobile. His handwriting became illegible, so younger brother Kliment Arkadyevich struggled to read his letters.

This period includes another special episode concerned family life, as far as Timiryazev's long-ill and deceased first wife was known to the editorial board, and the Timiryazevs lived in Saint Petersburg, while his young second wife was unknown to the journal. Problems began after the remarriage when the Istorichesky Vestnik contributor vanished. Soon it emerged he had not disappeared forever but submitted the next material on time. Where he sent it from remained unknown. This continued for years: a mysterious landlady collected foreign newspapers and journals from the office, leaving Timiryazev's ready materials without revealing his whereabouts.

B. B. Glinsky wrote: "The situation was astonishing, curious: a permanent responsible contributor of unknown location! This gave rise to many anecdotes in editorial life, and the late A. S. Suvorin roared with laughter when I portrayed the editorial predicament in faces. 'Ah, how vivid: a contributor in space!'" Only two years before V. A. Timiryazev's death did the editorial learn he was paralyzed, living at his dacha in Mustamäki, and the column "Foreign Historical News and Trifles" was maintained in his name by his young wife Ekaterina Sergeyevna. "And excellently maintained. He trained a successor. That's the best in literary work," Glinsky relayed Suvorin's view of this journalistic curiosity.

== Journalism and translations ==
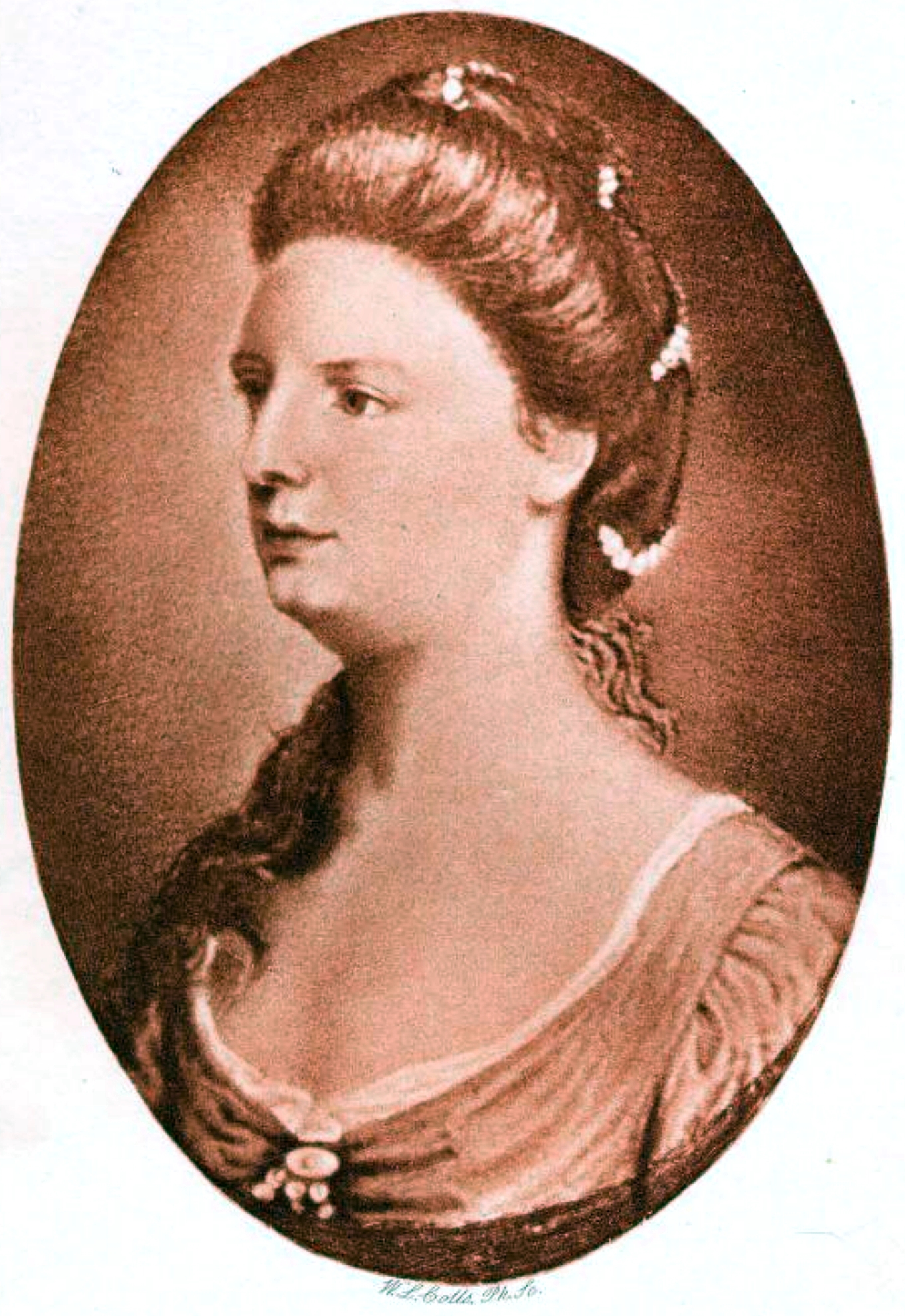
Great-grandmother of V. A. Timiryazev, Baroness Mary de Bode

B. B. Glinsky in Istorichesky Vestnik listed the most significant works of V. A. Timiryazev, excluding articles from other journals, translations, and publication dates: Prologue to the Alexandrine Era; Alexander I as International Arbitrator; Duc de Richelieu and the Odessa Plague of 1812; French Queen Anne Yaroslavna; Emperor Paul I; Daughter of Peter the Great (Elizabeth Petrovna); Six-Month Reign of Peter III; Alexander I and His Era; Pioneers of Enlightenment in Western Siberia; My Great-Grandmother (From Family Chronicle); Woman-Diplomat; French Diplomat at the Court of Catherine II; Adventurer of the Old and New World, and others.

K. A. Timiryazev, G. T. Chernenko and A. A. Druchok's biographers, cited an unnamed contemporary's opinion on V. A. Timiryazev's writing and translation abilities: "Devotes leisure hours to literature and is considered a master of translating foreign authors".

The history of the Timiryazevs' English ancestor, thrown into Russia by fate —as written by Glinsky and other biographers— is detailed in V. A. Timiryazev's article "My Great-Grandmother (From Family Chronicle)". All Timiryazev brothers cherished this genealogy. According to Vasily, his great-grandmother's father Thomas Kynnersley Jr. (Thomas Sneyd Kynnersley, Esq., ca. 1712—ca. 1755), son of Thomas Sr. (born 1687), was a gentleman owner of Loxley Park estate in Staffordshire. The Timiryazevs' great-grandmother Mary de Bode (1747—1812) was his fourth daughter. Traveling in Flanders, she met Alsatian officer Baron Karl August de Bode (1744—1797). They married in 1775. In 1788, after the death of Prince Charles de Rohan-Soubise, the de Bodes acquired the fief of Soultz in Alsace. The French Revolution beginning the next year deprived Mary and Karl August of their feudal holdings.

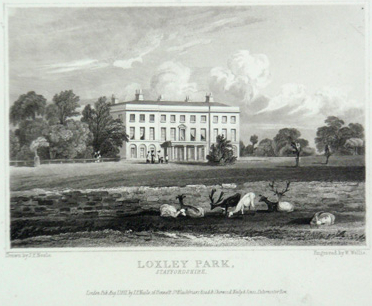
Here, in Loxley Hall, Mary de Bode was born. Engraving by John Preston Neale, 1818—1829

They fled to Prussia, then Russia, where Catherine II promised foreigners lands in Crimea and Novorossiya. The Empress graciously received the baron and baroness de Bode, granting vast lands. Karl August Ludwig Friedrich de Bode became Karl Illarionovich; his son Clemens Philipp Joseph de Bode (1777—1846) became Klementy Karlovich and married wealthy Englishwoman Charlotte Gardner in Saint Petersburg, becoming mother of Adelaida Klementyevna Timiryazeva. Mary de Bode herself, now Maria Bode, entered highest Saint Petersburg society, including the circle of Catherine's favorite Count P. A. Zubov. In Crimea, naturalist P. S. Pallas helped Maria Bode choose an estate with vineyard near Sudak. Paul I, besides Catherine's gifted Crimean and Yekaterinoslav lands, granted Maria Bode the estate Ropsha on the Gulf of Finland. The de Bode family's fate in Russia seemed ideal, but Maria dreamed of recovering the fief of Soultz left in Napoleonic France.

After Maria's death, the compensation lawsuit for loss of Soultz was pursued by Charlotte Frantsevna née Gardner and husband Klementy Karlovich Bode, then their son Klementy Klementyevich Bode. The English litigation lasted forty-six years, 1815 to 1861; the Bode case became notorious for duration, the million-pound compensation demanded from the British government (finally 1.5 million pounds sterling), and the English court's unwillingness to side with revolutionary emigrants de Bode, despite France recognizing them and paying Britain accordingly. According to Vasily Timiryazev, the notorious Bode case inspired Charles Dickens's novel Bleak House. The Bodes ended with nothing; legend says the Bode money funded reconstruction of Buckingham Palace, where Queen Victoria then resided. Maria Bode left a manuscript volume of Memoirs, lost after her death, but her English recollections translated into French survived in Recit d’avantures. On this basis, William Child-Pemberton (1859—1924) published in 1900 The Baroness de Bode, 1775—1803, attracting V. A. Timiryazev's attention as translator.

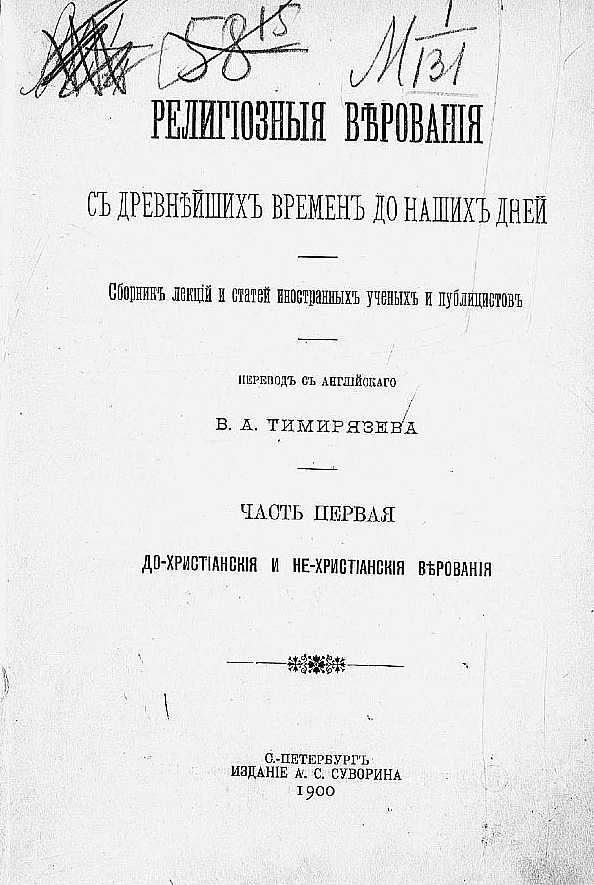
Religious Beliefs from Ancient Times to the Present Day. Collection of articles by C. P. Tiele, Leitner, E. Browne, U. Morfill, U. Rhys Davids, etc. Translation by V. A. Timiryazev, Saint Petersburg, 1900

In the second half of the 20th century, researchers noted V. A. Timiryazev's articles Chernyshyov and Michel (Istorichesky Vestnik, 1895, February), Diderot and Catherine (Istorichesky Vestnik, 1899, July). Commentators of Literary Heritage characterized V. A. Timiryazev's compilation and translation style regarding Millicent Fawcett's novel Janet Doncaster: introductory article on the English novel and Fawcett, then condensed retelling preserving original beauties and best passages where possible.

In the 21st century, Belarusian researcher Irina Chikalova in Great Britain: Comprehension of Historical Experience in the Russian Empire (19th—Early 20th Century), examining reviews of Anglo-Russian interconnections in Russian journals, particularly Istorichesky Vestnik, concluded that the main author on English topics in the 1890s was V. A. Timiryazev. She lists his essay on Byron as political figure, memoirs of British ambassador to Russia in the 1870s Lord Augustus Loftus, cycle on William Gladstone, Earl A. Rosebery, William Harcourt. In detail, she discussed Labor Deputies in England (1893). Among first working-class MPs: secretary and founder of the National Agricultural Labourers' Union Joseph Arch, mechanic John Burns, leader of the Independent Labour Party Keir Hardie, and miner Thomas Burt, appointed by Gladstone in his fourth cabinet as parliamentary secretary to the Board of Trade. Thomas Burt gained authority as secretary of the Northumberland Miners' Union.

I. R. Chikalova emphasizes that V. A. Timiryazev particularly admired English labor MPs' conviction in societal transformation through parliamentarism, not strike activity. He cited John Burns, founder of the Social Democratic Federation: "The era of strikes is over; strikes are dangerous, costly, and unreliable since syndicates of capitalists formed; now we must go to Parliament to secure happiness not only for two million union workers but eight million non-union ones".

Among other V. A. Timiryazev materials on Great Britain, I. R. Chikalova noted Russian Diplomats of the 18th Century in England, a compilation from the recently published book by V. N. Aleksandrenko Russian Diplomatic Agents of the 18th Century in London. In her view, the essay recommended the book well to readers interested in English history. She regretted only that independent works by V. A. Timiryazev on Great Britain in Istorichesky Vestnik ceased in 1898, though "My Great-Grandmother" on Mary de Bode from Child-Pemberton's book appeared in 1902. Scattered "trifles" remained in Foreign Historical News and Trifles.

"My Great-Grandmother. (From Family Chronicle)"

(Fragment)

Memory of my great-grandmother vividly lingered in every corner of the Ropsha estate near Narva, gifted to her by Emperor Paul. I used to stay here in childhood and youth, involuntarily imagining in every nook of the long old wooden house […] a tall, stern old lady. Everything, from mahogany furniture with bronze ornaments in empire style to ancient trees on the riverbank opposite the house windows, bore her imprint when great-grandmother reigned here… […] Many years passed, and the child who played in the old Ropsha house listening to mother's tales of great-grandmother became an old man.

— Vasily Timiryazev, pp. 75—76

Besides journal and newspaper publications, his translations appeared as separate editions. In 1891, Saint Petersburg publisher Grigory Fomich Panteleev planned a new thick literary-historical monthly Vestnik Inostrannoy Literatury. Supplements featured multi-volume collected works of foreign writers, classic and contemporary.

Brothers Pyotr and Grigory Panteleev attracted many outstanding Russian translators. V. A. Timiryazev participated. The journal published collected works of Walter Scott, Charles Dickens, Bret Harte, Émile Zola, George Sand, William Thackeray, and others. Books listed translators, unlike many earlier publishers. V. A. Timiryazev's name stood out. An anonymous reviewer in Mir Bozhiy praised the excellent translation of The Book of Snobs: "The translator shows complete knowledge of English life in details through faithful and subtle rendering of conversation nuances and everyday trifles".

The novel The Bride of Lammermoor from the Panteleev edition was reprinted in 1962 in volume 7 of the twenty-volume ("pink") Soviet edition of Walter Scott. V. A. Timiryazev's literary translations continue to be reprinted. In 2013, in Kharkiv and Belgorod, Club of Family Leisure published Walter Scott's "Collected Works in One Book". In 2021, Moscow publisher Veche issued The Bride of Lammermoor translated by V. A. Timiryazev and A. L. Yakovlev. Bret Harte's Gabriel Conroy translated by Vasily Timiryazev, read by Maxim Suslov, was released on CD in Moscow by "1C-Publishing" in 2016. Charles Dickens's The Mystery of Edwin Drood translated by Vasily Timiryazev is read by Dmitry Bykov, "Ardis" publisher, 2021.

Articles and translations in Otechestvennye Zapiski per "Contents Index of Otechestvennye Zapiski"; in Delo per its index. V. A. Timiryazev's correspondence is held at the Pushkin House in Saint Petersburg (fund 202, inventory 2).

== Publications in periodicals ==
- "Джон Стюарт Милль, его жизнь и труды (John Stuart Mill, His Life and Works)". Дело. October 1873.
- "Бэкер-паша и его экспедиция в Центральную Африку (Baker Pasha and His Expedition to Central Africa)". Дело.
- "Немецкая нравственность (German Morality)". Дело. September 1875.
- "Северо-Американские Соединённые Штаты после столетнего существования (The North American United States After a Century of Existence)". Дело.
- "Вениамин Дизраэли, лорд Биконсфилд (Benjamin Disraeli, Lord Beaconsfield)". Дело. December 1876.
- "Юбилейный год (The Jubilee Year)". Дело. January 1879.
- "Жизнь в Новой Каледонии (Life in New Caledonia)". Дело.
- "Бьёрнсон и его романы (Bjørnson and His Novels)". Отечественные Записки.
- "Повести и рассказы Бьёрнсона (Bjørnson's Stories and Tales)". Отечественные Записки. December 1883.
- "Датский археолог [Сегестед] (The Danish Archaeologist [Segested])". Исторический Вестник. May 1886.
- "Байрон как политический деятель (Byron as a Political Figure)". Исторический Вестник. June 1892.
- "Великий старик. (Уильям Гладстон). Историко-биографический очерк (The Grand Old Man (William Gladstone). Historical-Biographical Essay)". Исторический Вестник.
- "Хроника заграничной жизни (Chronicle of Foreign Life)". Русское Богатство.
- "Воспоминания английского дипломата XIX столетия [лорд Огастес Лофтус] (Memoirs of an English Diplomat of the 19th Century [Lord Augustus Loftus])". Исторический Вестник. February 1893.
- "Депутаты-рабочие в Англии (Working-Class Deputies in England)". Исторический Вестник. August 1893.
- "Парижская печать (The Paris Press)". Исторический Вестник. October 1893.
- "Международный третейский суд (International Arbitration Court)". Исторический Вестник. December 1893.
- "Преемники Гладстона. [граф Розбери, сэр Уильям Харкорт] (Gladstone's Successors [Earl of Rosebery, Sir William Harcourt])". Исторический Вестник. April 1894.
- "Чернышёв и Мишель". Исторический Вестник (2). 1895.
- "Обзор заграничной жизни (Review of Foreign Life)". Новое Слово. книга 7. April 1896.
- "Гладстон на закате своих дней (Gladstone in the Twilight of His Days)". Исторический Вестник. February 1897.
- "Александр I как международный третейский судья (Alexander I as International Arbitrator)". Исторический Вестник. March 1897.
- "Русские дипломаты XVIII столетия в Англии (Russian Diplomats of the 18th Century in England)". Исторический Вестник.
- "Памяти Гладстона (In Memory of Gladstone)". Исторический Вестник. June 1898.
- "Дидеро и Екатерина (Diderot and Catherine)". Исторический Вестник. July 1899.
- "Бисмарк в своих и чужих воспоминаниях (Bismarck in His Own and Others' Memoirs)". Исторический Вестник.
- "Переписка русских аристократок с иностранными знаменитостями (Correspondence of Russian Aristocratic Women with Foreign Celebrities)". Исторический Вестник. October 1899.
- "Шарль-Женевьева Дэон. Историко-биографический очерк (Charles-Geneviève d'Éon. Historical-Biographical Essay)". Исторический Вестник. November 1900.
- "Многомиллионщики Нового света (Multi-Millionaires of the New World)". Ежемесячные Литературные Приложения К Журналу «Нива».
- "Русский двор в XVIII столетии (The Russian Court in the 18th Century)". Ежемесячные Литературные Приложения К Журналу «Нива». January 1901.
- "Последний отпрыск ганноверского дома (The Last Scion of the House of Hanover)". Исторический Вестник. April 1901.
- "Внучка Бирона. Историко-биографический очерк (Biron's Granddaughter. Historical-Biographical Essay)". Исторический Вестник. November 1901.
- "Иностранцы о России (Foreigners on Russia)". Исторический Вестник.
- "Записки декабриста. (С. Г. Волконский) (Memoirs of a Decembrist (S. G. Volkonsky))". Исторический Вестник. January 1902.
- "Моя прабабушка (Из семейной хроники). [Мэри де Боде] (My Great-Grandmother (From Family Chronicles). [Mary de Bode])". Исторический Вестник. July 1902.
- "Английский король Эдуард VII. Биографический очерк (The English King Edward VII. Biographical Essay)". Исторический Вестник. August 1902.
- "Русские об иностранцах (Russians on Foreigners)". Исторический Вестник. December 1902.
- "Женщина-дипломатка (Дарья Христофоровна Ливен) (A Woman Diplomat (Daria Khristoforovna Lieven))". Исторический Вестник. July 1903.
- "Двадцатишестилетнее служение России Царя-Освободителя (Twenty-Six Years of Service to Russia by the Tsar-Liberator)". Исторический Вестник. August 1903.

== Translations ==
- Edward Jenkins (July 1871). "Джинксов младенец, его рождение и другие несчастия (Ginx's Baby: His Birth and Other Misfortunes)". Отечественные Записки.
- Edward Jenkins (July 1872). "Либеральный аристократ [роман «Лорд Бантам» (Lord Bantam)]". Отечественные Записки.
- John Stuart Mill (1873). "Из автобиографии Джона Стюарта Милля (From the Autobiography of John Stuart Mill)". Дело.
- Edward Jenkins (April 1875). "Мускокские легенды. Рассказы (Muskoka Legends. Stories)". Отечественные Записки.
- Edward Jenkins (January 1876). "Мальчик с пальчик. Святочный рассказ [рассказ «Крошка Годж» (Little Hodg)]". Отечественные Записки.
- Edward Jenkins (May 1876). "Королева или императрица (Queen or Empress)". Отечественные Записки.
- Arthur Evans (August 1876). "Босния и Герцеговина во время восстания (Bosnia and Herzegovina During the Insurrection)". Отечественные Записки.
- Francis Bret Harte (1876). "Габриэль Конрой. Роман (Gabriel Conroy. Novel)". Отечественные Записки.
- Millicent Fawcett (1876). "Дженни Донкастер (Jenny Doncaster)". Отечественные Записки.
- Edward Jenkins (Spring 1877). "Жизнь рабочих в английской Гвиане (The Life of Workers in British Guiana)". Отечественные Записки.
- May Laffan (May 1880). "На улицах Дублина. Рассказ о трёх оборванцах (On the Streets of Dublin. A Story of Three Ragged Boys)". Отечественные Записки.
- May Laffan (June 1881). "Дублинские трущобы (Dublin Slums)". Отечественные Записки.
- Henry Lucy (1883). "Гедеон Флис. Роман (Gideon Fleyce. Novel)". Отечественные Записки.
- William Makepeace Thackeray (1895). Книга снобов; Дух Синей бороды. Рассказ (The Book of Snobs; Bluebeard's Ghost. Story). Собрание сочинений. Vol. Т. 3. Ред. «Вестника иностранной литературы». СПб.: Тип. бр. Пантелеевых. pp. 96—197 (Книга снобов), 301—314 (Дух Синей бороды).
- William T. Sherbook (April 1896). "Свет во мраке (Light in the Darkness)". Новое Слово. книга 7.
- Walter Scott (1896). Гай Маннеринг, или Астролог : Роман (Guy Mannering, or The Astrologer: Novel). Собрание сочинений избранных иностранных писателей. Vol. Т. 2. СПб.: Тип. бр. Пантелеевых. p. 370.
- Walter Scott (1896). Ламмермурская невеста. Роман (The Bride of Lammermoor. Novel). Собрание сочинений избранных иностранных писателей. Vol. Т. 4. СПб.: Тип. бр. Пантелеевых. p. 260.
- Walter Scott (1897). Эдинбургская темница, или Сердце Среднего Лотиана : Роман (The Heart of Midlothian. Novel). Собрание сочинений избранных иностранных писателей. Vol. Т. 9. СПб.: Тип. бр. Пантелеевых. p. 480.
- Walter Scott (1899). Антикварий : Роман (The Antiquary: Novel). Собрание сочинений избранных иностранных писателей. Vol. Т. 16. СПб.: Тип. бр. Пантелеевых. p. 388.
- Charles Dickens (1896). Большие надежды : Роман (Great Expectations: Novel). Собрание сочинений избранных иностранных писателей. Vol. Т. 3. Пер. Г. Ф. Пантелеева, В. А. Тимирязева, С. С. Трубачёва; Ред. Ф. И. Булгаков, С. С. Трубачёв. СПб.: Тип. бр. Пантелеевых. p. 420.
- Charles Dickens (1897). Наш взаимный друг : Роман в 4 кн. (Our Mutual Friend: Novel in 4 books). Собрание сочинений избранных иностранных писателей. Vol. Т. 13–14. Пер. Г. Ф. Пантелеева, В. А. Тимирязева, С. С. Трубачёва; Ред. Ф. И. Булгаков, С. С. Трубачёв. СПб.: Тип. бр. Пантелеевых. pp. 400 (кн. 1–2), 372 (кн. 3–4).
- Charles Dickens (1898). Тайна Эдвина Друда: Роман (The Mystery of Edwin Drood: Novel). Собрание сочинений избранных иностранных писателей. Vol. Т. 15. Пер. Г. Ф. Пантелеева, В. А. Тимирязева, С. С. Трубачёва; Ред. Ф. И. Булгаков, С. С. Трубачёв. СПб.: Тип. бр. Пантелеевых. p. 354.
- Bret Harte (1896). Гэбриель Конрой : Роман (Gabriel Conroy: Novel). Собрание сочинений избранных иностранных писателей. Vol. Т. 1. Ред. Ф. И. Булгаков. СПб.: Тип. бр. Пантелеевых. p. 318.
- Bret Harte (1896). Кресси: Роман; Рассказы (Cressy: Novel; Stories). Собрание сочинений избранных иностранных писателей. Vol. Т. 2. Пер. А. Н. Линдегрен и В. А. Тимирязева; Ред. Ф. И. Булгаков. СПб.: Тип. бр. Пантелеевых. p. 346.
- George Sand (1898). Валентина : Роман (Valentine: Novel). Собрание сочинений избранных иностранных писателей. Vol. Т. 13. Ред. Ф. И. Булгаков, С. С. Трубачёв. СПб.: Тип. бр. Пантелеевых. p. 399.
- Émile Zola (1896). Марсельские тайны; Мечты (The Mysteries of Marseille; Dreams). Собрание сочинений избранных иностранных писателей. Vol. Т. 3. Ред. Ф. И. Булгаков. СПб.: Тип. бр. Пантелеевых. pp. 274, 134.
- Émile Zola (1896). Карьера Ругонов (The Fortune of the Rougons). Собрание сочинений избранных иностранных писателей. Vol. Т. 4. Ред. Ф. И. Булгаков. СПб.: Тип. бр. Пантелеевых. p. 272.
- Émile Zola (1897). Страница любви : Роман (A Love Episode: Novel). Собрание сочинений избранных иностранных писателей. Vol. Т. 11. Ред. Ф. И. Булгаков. СПб.: Тип. бр. Пантелеевых. p. 232.

== Bibliography ==
- Benina, M. A. (1993). Журнал «Дело» (1866—1888) : Указ. содерж. — Вып. 1 [Journal "Delo" (1866—1888): Content Index. Issue 1.]. СПб.: Изд-во Рос. нац. б-ки. p. 457.
- Bograd, V. E. (1971). Журнал «Отечественные записки». 1868—1884 : указатель содержания [Journal "Otechestvennye Zapiski". 1868—1884: Content Index]. М.: Книга. p. 733.
- Glinsky, B. (1912). "Тимирязев В. А.: некролог" [Timiryazev V. A.: Obituary]. Исторический Вестник. CXXIX (9): 1129–1130.
- Glinsky, B. B. (1915). "«Исторический вестник» за 35 лет (Портретная галерея)" ["Istorichesky Vestnik" for 35 Years (Portrait Gallery)]. Исторический Вестник. CXXXIX (1). Петроград: Т-ва А. С. Суворина: 180–207.
- Druchok, A. A. (2019). "Его родословная" [His Genealogy]. Тимирязев: путь биолога [Timiryazev: The Path of a Biologist]. М., Берлин: Директ-Медиа. p. 210. ISBN 978-5-4475-3037-2.
- Leskov, N. S. (1957). Gruzdev A. I. (ed.). Собрание сочинений [Collected Works]. Vol. 9 (В одиннадцати томах ed.). М.: Гослитиздат.
- Masanov, I. F. (1960). "Тимирязев Василий Аркадьевич" [Timiryazev Vasily Arkadyevich]. Словарь псевдонимов русских писателей, учёных и общественных деятелей [Dictionary of Pseudonyms of Russian Writers, Scientists and Public Figures]. Vol. 4. p. 468.
- Saltykov-Shchedrin, M. E. (1977). Bograd V. E. (ed.). Собрание сочинений [Collected Works]. Письма (1881—1884). Vol. 19. М.: Художественная литература. p. 352.
- Tsetlin, L. S. (1945). Тимирязев. [1843—1920] [Timiryazev. [1843—1920]] (PDF). Научно-популярная серия. Биографии. М.-Л.: Издательство АН СССР. p. 155.
- Chernenko, G. T. (1991). Тимирязев в Петербурге — Петрограде [Timiryazev in St. Petersburg — Petrograd]. Выдающиеся деятели науки и культуры в Петербурге — Петрограде — Ленинграде. Л.: Лениздат. p. 239. ISBN 5-289-00911-6.
