= Kliment Timiryazev =

Russian biologist (1843–1920)

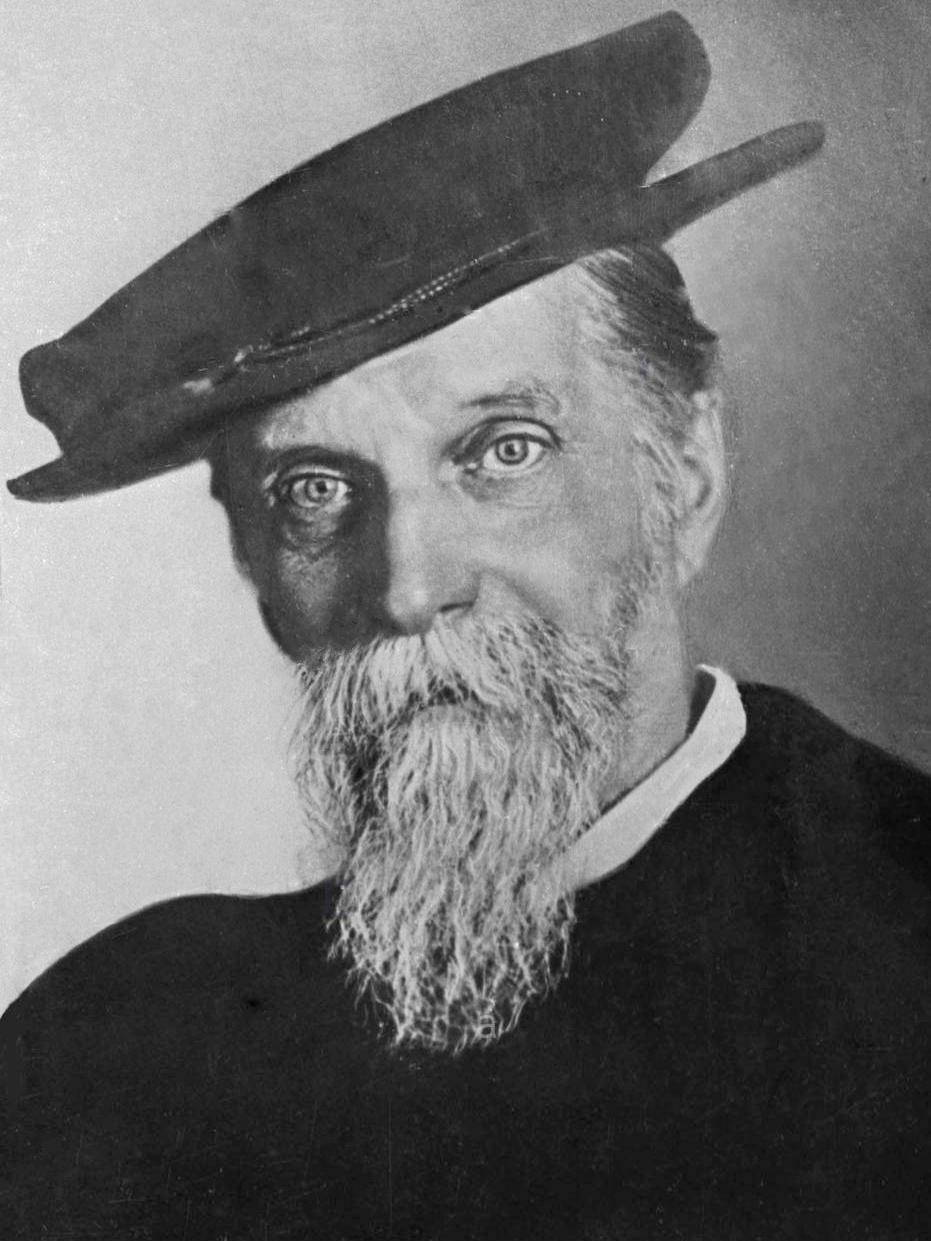
- Timiryazev in 1911
- Born: 22 May 1843; Saint Petersburg, Russian Empire
- Died: 28 April 1920 (aged 76); Moscow, Russian Soviet Republic
- Education: Saint Petersburg State University
- Awards: Croonian Lecture (1903)
- Scientific career
- Fields: Botany, physiology
- Workplaces: Moscow State University
- Thesis: Spectral analysis of chlorophyll (1871)

Kliment Arkadievich Timiryazev, sometimes Timiriazev (Russian: Климент Аркадьевич Тимирязев; 22 May [O.S. 10 May] 1843 – 28 April 1920) was a Russian botanist and physiologist and a major proponent of thought of Charles Darwin in Russia. He founded a faculty of plant physiology and a laboratory at the Petrovskoye Academy.

== Biography ==
Timiryazev was born to Arkady Semyenovich Timiryazev, a Russian statesman, and Adelaida Bode, an English woman of French origin, who later received Russian citizenship. He had at least three brothers: Nikolai (1835–1906), a military officer, Dimitri (1837–1903), a specialists in statistics, and Vasily (c. 1841–1912), a writer. Timiryazev was first educated by private teachers at home. In 1861 he entered the Saint Petersburg University and graduated with honors from the faculty of physics and mathematics in 1866. Two years later he published his first article, on a device for studying breakdown of carbon dioxide, and was sent abroad, where he studied under Wilhelm Hofmeister, Robert Bunsen, Gustav Kirchhoff, Marcellin Berthelot, Hermann von Helmholtz, Jean-Baptiste Boussingault and Claude Bernard. Upon returning to Russia in 1871 he defended a PhD on spectral analysis of chlorophyll and was appointed as professor of Petrov's Academy of Agriculture, until its closure in 1892. Since 1877 he also lectured at the Moscow State University. His research work was devoted to photosynthesis-related phenomena. He also pioneered the use of greenhouses for agricultural research in Russia, which he initiated in early 1870s. He was a member of the Russian Academy of Sciences (since 1890), Royal Society (1911) and Botanical Society of Scotland (1911), and an honorary professor of the Saint Petersburg University, Kharkov University, University of Glasgow (1901), University of Cambridge (1909) and University of Geneva (1909).

In 1911 Timiriazev put forth the idea of organizing scientific research in special institutes outside the universities, which later became the dominant Soviet trend. Shortly before his death in 1920, he publicly endorsed the Bolshevik regime, thus helping to forge the pact between research-oriented scientists and the Soviet government.

== Darwinism ==
Timiryazev was a major proponent of the evolution theory of Charles Darwin in Russia. In 1877, he visited and met Darwin at Down House.

Timiryazev promoted Darwinism in his works and prepared a Russian translation of On the Origin of Species. However, he was highly critical of the term "struggle for existence" which he rejected. He believed that it was an unfortunate metaphor with negative social implications and stated that Darwinism could be taught without using the word "struggle".

At the University of Moscow, Alexander Oparin attended private lectures of Timiryazev. These lectures on evolution were highly influential to Oparin. He also lectured on Darwinism at his flat in Moscow.

== Legacy ==
Timiryazev Agricultural Academy, the Timiryazevskaya station of the Moscow Metro, the lunar crater Timiryazev and the asteroid 6082 Timiryazev are named after him. The Regional Universal Scientific Library in Vinnytsia, Ukraine, used to be named after Kliment Timiryazev, the named was changed at the end of 2022, however, in the wake of the Russian invasion of Ukraine. The Timiryazev State Museum of Biology in Moscow is also named after him.

At the beginning of the Tverskoy Boulevard in Moscow there is a statue of Timiryazev which was unveiled on 4 November 1923, sculpted by Sergey Merkurov and laid out by the architect Osipov. Timiryazev is depicted in the gown of Cambridge University where he was awarded an honorary doctorate. The granite pedestal bears the inscription of 'the curve of plant physiology' which Timiryazev elucidated. In October 1941 the statue was overturned by a Fascist bomb, but after a few hours it was back in its place. Its lower half still bears the marks caused by bomb splinters.

One of major streets in Almaty, Kazakhstan and a district in North Kazakhstan are named after him.

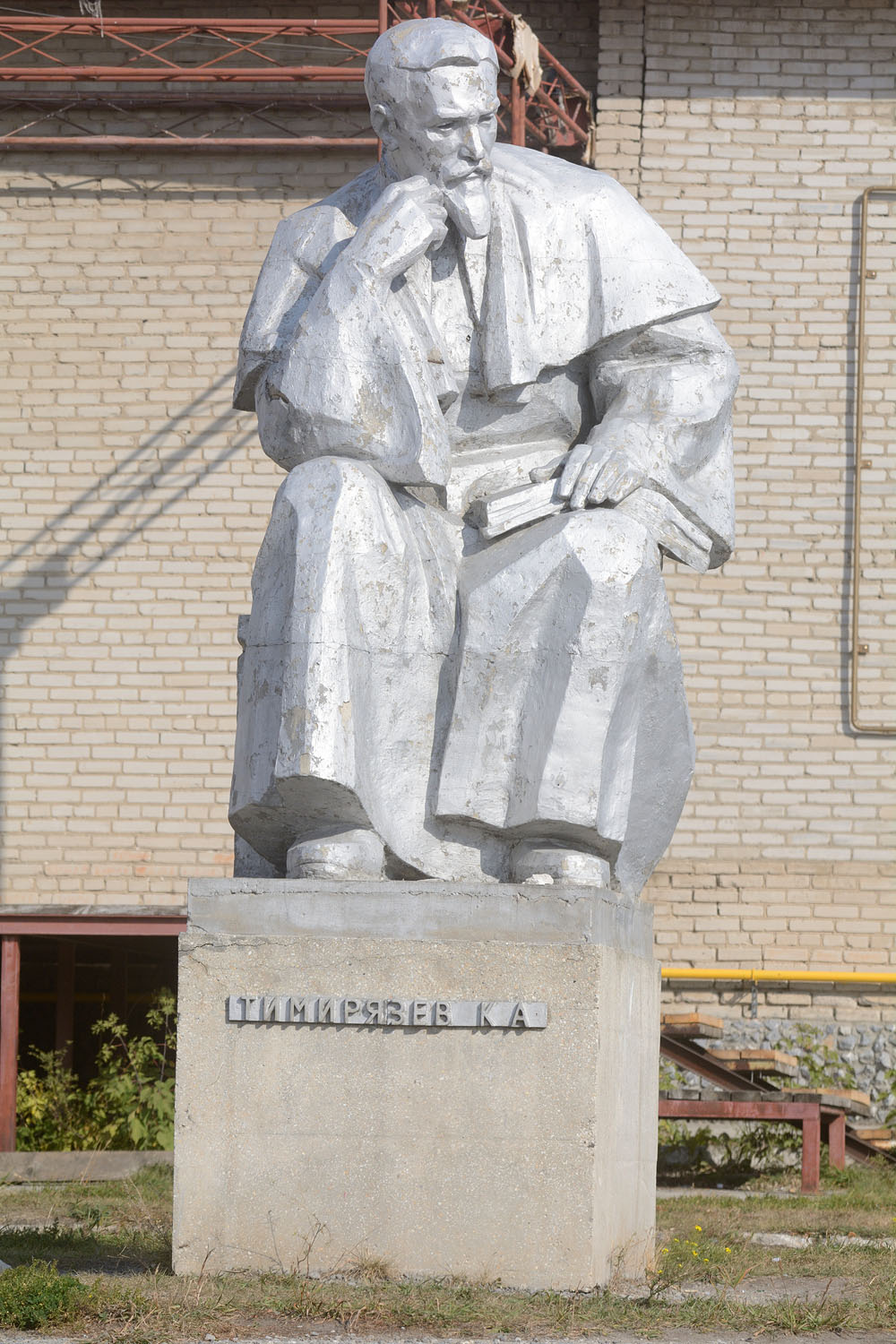
Monument to K.A. Timiryazev in the village of Talmenka, Iskitimsky district, Novosibirsk Oblast

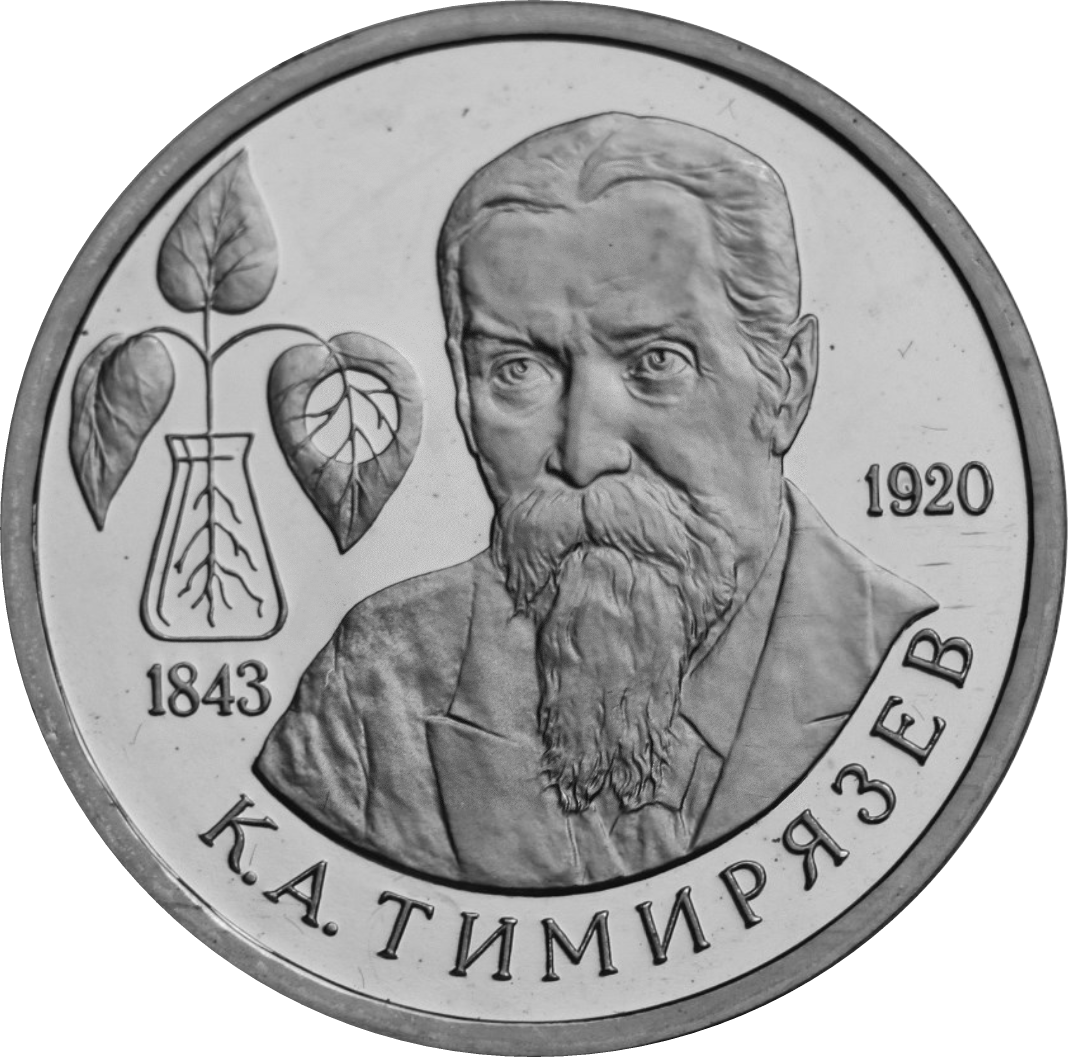
1993 Russian 1 rouble coin commemorating the 150th anniversary of Timiryazev's birth

== Selected publications ==
- The Life Of The Plant (1958 English edition)
