= Tverskoy Boulevard =

Thoroughfare in Moscow, Russia

Coordinates: 55°45′43″N 37°36′09″E

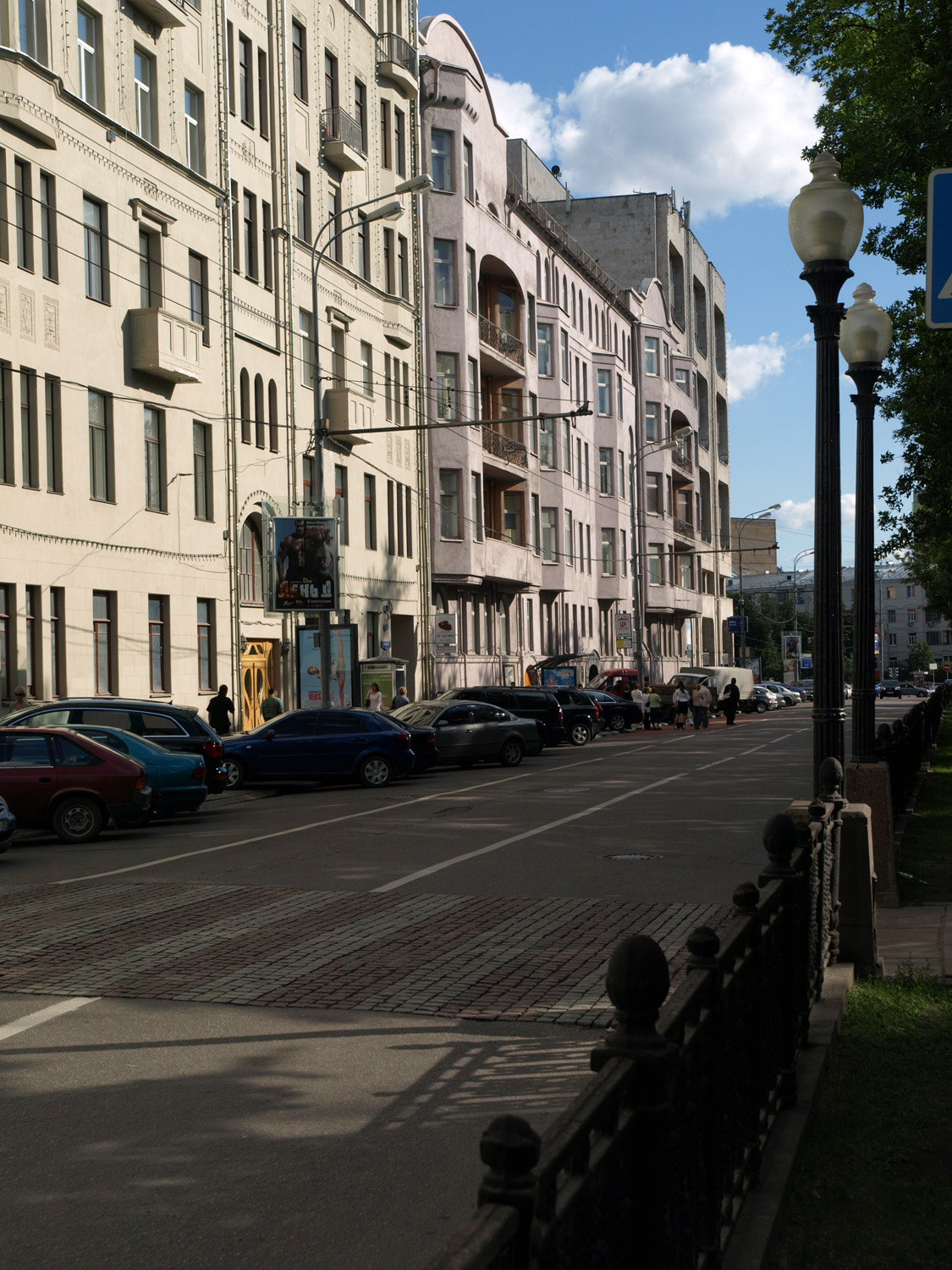
Tverskoy Boulevard

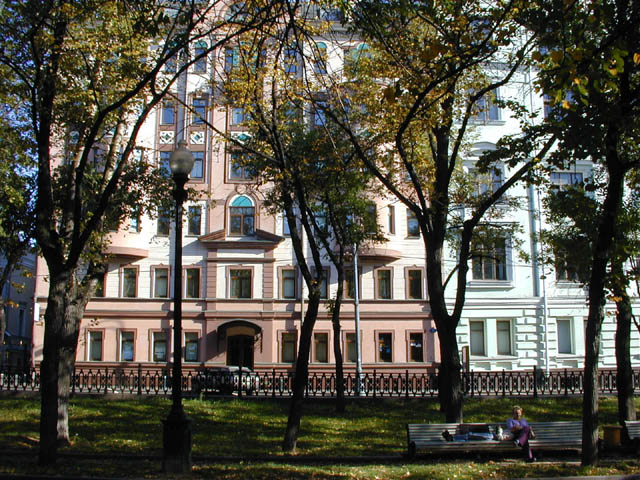
A facade on Tverskoy Boulevard

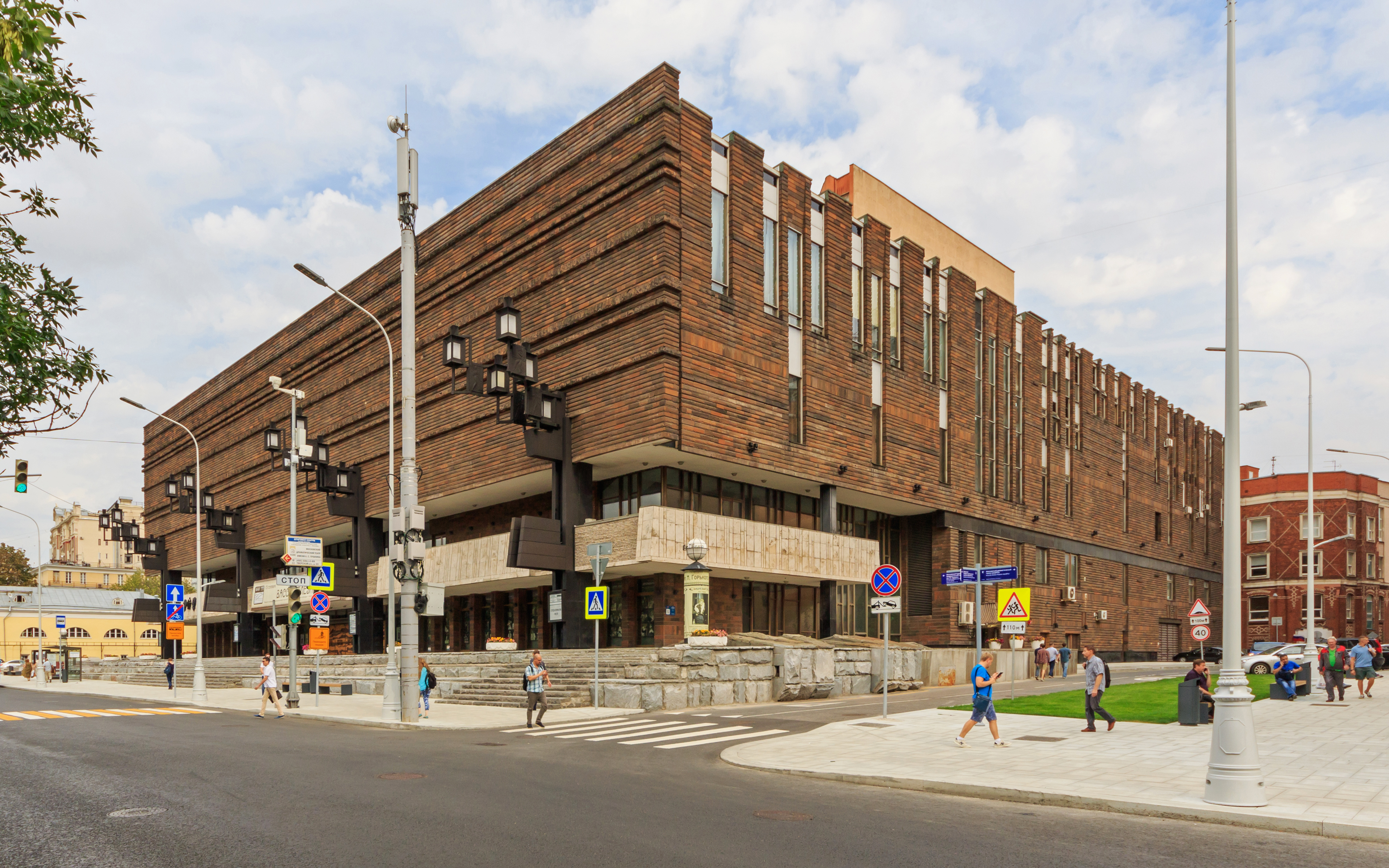
MHAT

Tverskoy Boulevard (Russian: Тверской бульвар) is one of the main thoroughfares in central Moscow. It is a part of the Boulevard Ring and begins at the end of the Nikitsky Boulevard, at the crossing with Bolshaya Nikitskaya Street. The boulevard ends at the Pushkin Square and Tverskaya Street, one of the busiest places in Moscow. East of Tverskaya Street becomes Strastnoy Boulevard.

== First ==
Tverskoy Boulevard was the first boulevard in the historical neighbourhood of Bely Gorod, "White Town" in Russian. The name comes from the fact that Bely Gorod was surrounded by white stone fortification wall which was built at the end of the 15th century and demolished at the end of the 17th century. It was replaced by several boulevards, together forming the Boulevard Ring.

== 1796 ==
This oldest of Moscow's boulevards was laid out in 1796 under the direction of the architect Karin. Silver birches were the first trees to be planted here, but they did not take root, and so for almost 200 years the wind has rustled through the heavy foliage of mighty lime trees. Immediately after it was laid out this picturesque boulevard became a favourite place for high society people to take their walks. It became “a green club” for the Moscow aristocracy because of a great number of lime trees on the boulevard.

== 1812 ==
In October 1812 the boulevard's appearance was dramatically changed when French soldiers put up their tents here. They used the lamp posts to hang Muscovites whom they suspected of arson. Almost all the limes were cut down for firewood. After the French retreat, Tverskoy got some rivals, as new boulevards were laid out. Nevertheless, it remained so much more popular than the others that people would often simply say 'the Boulevard,' and it was understood that they were referring to Tverskoy.

In the reign of Nicolas I mulberry trees were planted on the boulevard, and they produce their leaves late. In spring the emperor came to visit Moscow and he went for an early morning stroll along the boulevard. He drew attention to the incomprehensible ‘sticks’ on the boulevard, and so Zakrevsky, the governor-general, ordered the fire brigade for the Tverskoy area to take up these trees that same night. The following morning he reported to the emperor: “Your Highness, the Boulevard has been cleared of sticks!”

In the years before the revolution the boulevard and coffee house opposite where the Pushkin Theatre now stands were the favourite meeting places for Moscow's artists.

== 1923 ==
At the beginning of the boulevard a statue of the scientist Kliment Timiryazev was unveiled on 4 November 1923, sculpted by Sergey Merkurov and laid out by the architect Osipov. The scholar is depicted in the gown of Cambridge University where he was awarded an honorary doctorate. The granite pedestal bears the inscription of 'the curve of plant physiology' which Timiryazev elucidated. In October 1941 the statue was overturned by a Fascist bomb, but after a few hours it was back in its place. Its lower half still bears the marks caused by bomb splinters. The site was chosen after the corner block of Tverskoy Boulevard and Bolshaya Nikitskaya Street, facing the square, burnt down. The new city administration preferred to keep the open area and installed the monument to Timiryazev in 1923, which is one of the oldest extant monuments of the Soviet age.

== 1990s ==
In 1995 a statue by Bichugov was put up in the centre of the boulevard in memory of Sergei Yesenin.

On the left hand side at No. 11 there is a house built in the first half of the 19th century. From 1889 to 1928 it was the home of the great actress Maria Yermolova. Her father was the prompter at the Maly Theatre—she learnt to read from his prompt copies of plays. In 1862 her father enrolled her in the drama school on Neglinnaya Street. It was said of her first role, in Emilia Galotti on the stage of the Maly Theatre, that such a debut occurs only once in a hundred years. She played the lead roles in the tragedies The Maid of Orleans and Mary Stuart by Friedrich Schiller, and Katerina Kabanova and Larisa Ogudalova in Ostrovsky's plays. Her study was on the first floor with windows of violet glass. On 15 May 1970 the house was opened as a memorial museum.

On the site of the new building of MKhAT (No.22) stood the house of A. Kologrivov, where long years ago extravagant balls were held. Praskovya Yurevna, the elderly lady of the house, was very keen on these entertainments, and she served Griboyedov as a model for his Tatyana Yurevna in Woe from Wit -

       Such balls she gives – none could be richer  
       From Christmas-tide and on to Easter.

In her younger days she organized performances of Italian operas in her home, and took part herself as prima donna. Karamzin was a devoted admirer of her talent. It was in this house in 1829 at a ball of the renowned dancing master Yogel that Alexander Pushkin met the young beauty Natalia Goncharova for the first time, and fell head over heels in love with her. Two years later she became his wife.

At house No. 25 a beautiful yellow and white mansion is concealed behind a modest fence. Early last century it was owned by A. Yakoviev, the uncle of A. Hertzen. Hertzen was born here in 1812, and hence the building is often known as 'Hertzen's house'.

== Literary center ==
In 1920 the house was handed over to writers' organisations, and it became the country's literary centre. Yesenin and Mayakovsky gave readings here.

Many Russian writers described Tverskoy Boulevard in their books, for example Leo Tolstoy, Anton Chekhov, Ivan Bunin, Alexander Pushkin and Mikhail Bulgakov. This area is one of the cultural centers of Moscow. There are many museums, theatres and galleries here.

== Sources ==
- Source: "Great Moscow 850: Guide", E.Efimova, 1997
