= Nikolay Andreyev (sculptor) =

- Николай Андреевич Андреев
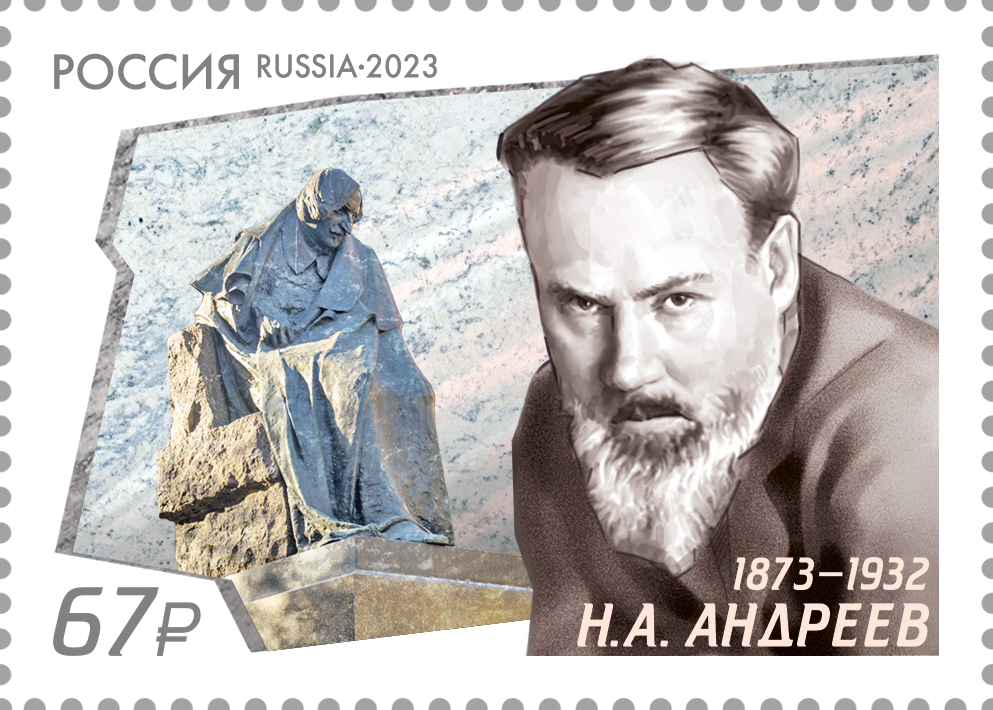
- Andreyev on a 2023 stamp of Russia, with the Gogol Monument in the background
- Born: 14 October [O.S. 2 October] 1873; Moscow, Russian Empire
- Died: 1932 (aged 58–59)
- Resting place: Novodevichy Cemetery, Moscow
- Known for: Sculpture and portrait drawing
- Notable work: Gogol Monument, 1909

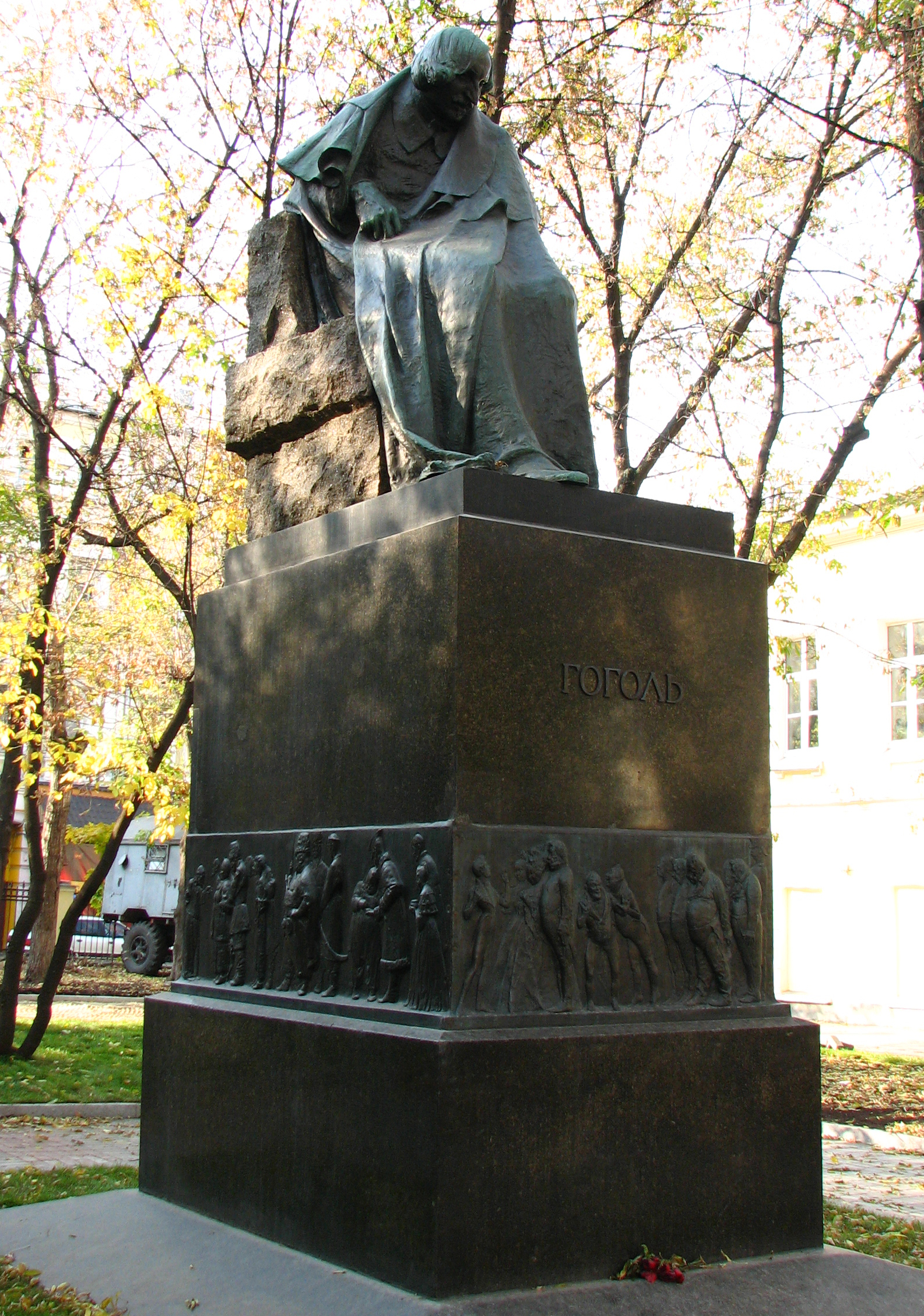
Statue of Gogol now standing in a courtyard of Nikitsky Boulevard

Nikolay Andreyevich Andreyev (Russian: Никола́й Андре́евич Андре́ев; 26 October [O.S. 14 October] 1873 – 24 December 1932) was a Russian and later Soviet sculptor, graphic artist and stage designer.

== Life and career ==
As a young man Andreyev studied with Sergey Volnukhin and in 1902 became associated with the Peredvizhniki group of realists. Andreyev's brother V.A. Andreyev was also a sculptor.

A native of Moscow, Andreyev was the designer of two Moscow statues known for their removal. One is the seated bronze figure of Gogol, with bronze friezes of Gogol's greatest characters surrounding the base, finished in 1909 and placed on Gogol Boulevard. Criticized for its impressionistic style and dark mood, said to be hated by Stalin himself, it was moved in 1952 amid controversy, and replaced with a straightforward Soviet-style representation of Gogol by sculptor Nikolai Tomsky.

Similarly Andreyev's figure of "Freedom" (loosely, the "Statue of Liberty") was erected with a 26-meter obelisk in Tverskaya Street in 1919, to commemorate the Soviet Constitution. It was blown up in 1941 and replaced with the equestrian statue of Yuri Dolgorukiy, by sculptor Sergei Orlov, completed in 1954.

Andreyev's later work is strongly associated with the Soviet Socialist realism style, and he's known for his extensive studies of "Leniniana", producing some 100 sculptures and 200 graphic works of Lenin from 1920 through 1932. He also produced a large number of portraits of Soviet leaders, including Stalin and Anatoly Lunacharsky.

Andreyev created the first post-1917 artistic representation of Stalin, dated 1 May 1922 and autographed by Stalin himself. This drawing was executed in the realist style including Stalin's pockmarks and stiffened arm. This was also the last time Stalin was portrayed with his imperfection. The drawing was later criticized by the Great Leader, questioning Andreyev's knowledge of human anatomy.

== Death ==
Andreyev died in Moscow and is buried in the city's most famous cemetery, Novodevichy.
