= Sergey Merkurov =

Soviet sculptor (1881–1952)

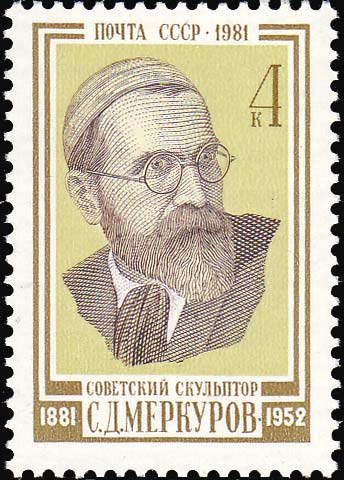
- A 1981 Soviet stamp commemorating the 100th anniversary of Sergey Merkurov's birth
- Born: 7 November 1881; Alexandropol, then part of Erivan Governorate, Russian Empire
- Died: 8 June 1952 (aged 70); Moscow, then part of Russian SFSR, Soviet Union
- Known for: Sculpting
- Style: Socialist realism

Sergey Dmitriyevich Merkurov (Russian: Серге́й Дми́триевич Мерку́ров, 7 November [O.S. 26 October] 1881 – 8 June 1952) was a Soviet sculptor-monumentalist of Greek-Armenian descent. He was a People's Artist of the USSR in visual arts, an academic at the Soviet Academy of Arts, and director of the Pushkin Museum of Fine Arts from 1944 to 1949. Merkurov was considered the greatest Soviet master of post-mortem masks. He was the sculptor of the three biggest monuments of Joseph Stalin in the USSR.

He was the cousin of George Gurdjieff, a mystic and spiritual teacher.

== Biography ==
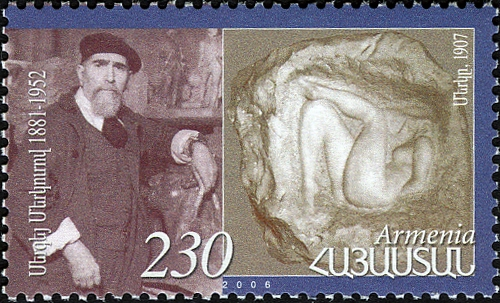
2006 Armenian stamp featuring Sergey Merkurov and his 1907 work

Sergey Merkurov was born in Alexandropol (now Gyumri). He left the Kyiv Polytechnic Institute after a political scandal and moved to Switzerland, where he became a student of the Swiss sculptor Adolf Meyer. He attended art college in Germany (1902–1905) and then entered the Auguste Rodin studio in Paris.

Merkurov had met Vladimir Lenin when the revolutionary leader was living abroad, and listened to his speeches. Among many others, the statue of Lenin that stood at Lenin Square (today Republic Square) in Yerevan during Soviet times was also the work of Merkurov.

Merkurov returned to the Russian Empire in 1907 as he was called by the Armenian Apostolic Church authorities to execute a post-mortem mask of Catholicos Mkrtich Khrimian. It was his first work of this kind. Then he lived in Tbilisi, Yalta, Moscow, and made post-mortem (death) masks of Leo Tolstoy, Hovhannes Tumanyan, Vladimir Lenin and his wife, Maxim Gorky, Vladimir Mayakovsky and other famous people. The technique itself is not an easy process. The author pours plaster on the body's face and puts a thread in the middle of it. Then, another material like bronze or plaster is poured inside the mask and this is how an actual-size face of the deceased results.

Merkurov was an outstanding representative of academic modern style, employing the themes of death and stone blocks. As a philosopher of the arts, Merkurov also used motifs of thought (Monument of Dostoevsky, 1911–1913; The figure-portrait of Thought, 1918).

Merkurov was known as a free-thinker and an extraordinary person. He was a member of the "United Workers' Brotherhood", the Association of Painters of Revolutionary Russia and the Communist Party of the Soviet Union.

As director of the Pushkin Museum of Fine Arts, he saved the monument of Catherine the Great and secretly sent it to Yerevan, where it was hidden for decades and finally returned to Russia in 2006.

For Joseph Stalin's 70th birthday, Merkurov made a special gift, a costly granite monument called "Death of the Leader". Stalin refused to accept it and a difficult period in the sculptor's life began.

Merkurov was honored with burial at the Novodevichy Cemetery in Moscow. In 1953 his Notes of a Sculptor was published.

== Merkurov Museum in Gyumri ==
In 1984 the Merkurov Museum was opened in his family house in Gyumri. The post-mortem masks of 59 Soviet leaders and famous people are displayed in the museum, including the only original death mask of Lenin.
