= List of monuments and memorials in Moscow =

== Military monuments and memorials ==
- Monument to the Heroes – Schoolchildren
- Triumphal Arch
- Tomb of the Unknown Soldier
- Monument to Warriors-Internationalists

== Monuments and memorials to labor ==
- Worker and Kolkhoz Woman

== Monuments and memorials to peace and childhood ==
- We demand peace!
- Children Are the Victims of Adult Vices

== Monuments and memorials to people ==
=== Military leaders ===
- Monument to Fyodor Tolbukhin

=== Musicians ===
- Monument to Muslim Magomayev
- Monument to Sergei Rachmaninov

=== Monarchs ===
- Alexander Garden Obelisk
- Alley of the rulers of Russia
- Monument to Alexander II
- Monument to Grand Duke Sergey Alexandrovich
- Monument to Peter the Great
- Monument to Vladimir the Great
- Monument to Yuriy Dolgorukiy

=== Politicians ===
- Monument to Felix Dzerzhinsky
- Charles de Gaulle Monument
- Monument to Ho Chi Minh
- Vladimir Lenin
  - Lenin Monument in the Kaluga Square
  - Monument to Lenin in Luzhniki
  - Monument to Lenin on Tverskaya Square
  - Lenin Monument, Pavlovskaya Street
- Monument to Minin and Pozharsky
- Monument to Robespierre (destroyed)

=== Scientists and discoverers ===
- Cosmonauts Alley
- Monument to Nil Filatov
- Monument to Yuri Gagarin
- Timiryazev monument

=== Writers and philosophers ===
- Monument to Joseph Brodsky
- Monument to Friedrich Engels
- Alexander Fadeev Monument
- Monuments to Herzen and Ogaryov
- Karl Marx monument
- Monument to Leo Tolstoy (Prechistenka Street)
- Monument to Marina Tsvetaeva

== Monuments and memorials to science ==
- Monument to the Conquerors of Space

== Monuments and memorials to victims of political repressions ==
- Solovetsky Stone
- Wall of Grief
