= Mikhail Reva =

Ukrainian artist and sculptor (born 1960)

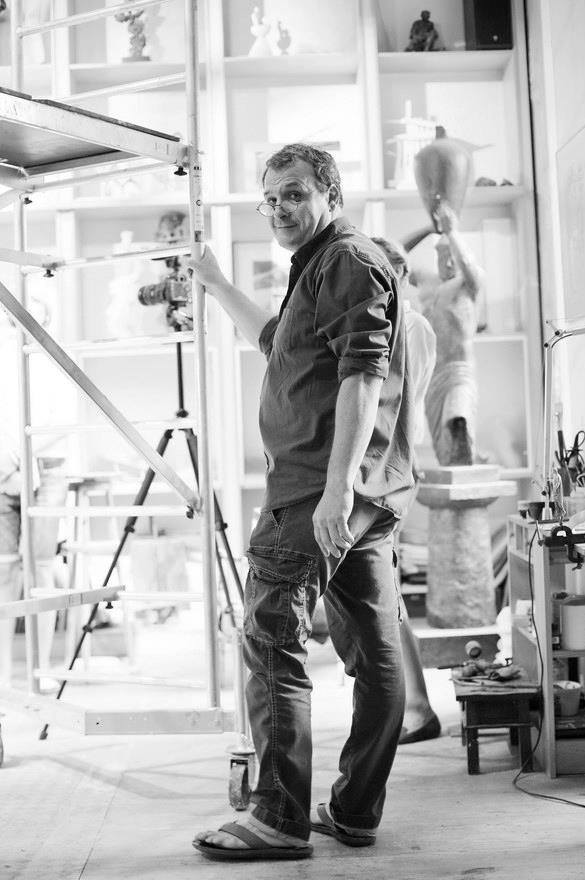
- Born: 13 March 1960 (age 66); Kerch, Ukrainian SSR, Soviet Union (now Ukraine)
- Education: Saint Petersburg Art & Industry Academy
- Known for: urban design, monuments, sculpture, art works, books illustration
- Awards: The Honoured Artist of Ukraine
- Website: http://revafoundation.com

Mykhailo Volodymyrovych Reva (Ukrainian: Михайло Володимирович Рева; born 13 March 1960) is a Ukrainian artist, sculptor, architect and founder of the non-profit organization REVA Foundation.

== Activities ==
- 1991-1992 Internship at the Roman Academy of Arts, Italy
- 1992 Personal exhibition in the House of the Artist, Moscow
- 1994 International exhibition of miniature sculptures, dedicated to Divine Comedy Dante in Ravenna, Italy
- 1995 "Gateway to ..." - personal exhibition within the framework of the International Conference dedicated to V.V. Kandinsky at Museum of Western and Eastern Arts, Odesa
- 1996 DREAMS OF MONTEZUMA - personal exhibition within a framework of international project "Communication" in Caracas, Venezuela
- 1997 Grand Prix of the International Festival of Arts GOLDEN PERETIN, Kyiv, Ukraine
- 2000 Participation in the exhibition "20 Artists of Ukraine at the end of the 20th century". National Museum of Art, Kyiv
- 2000 Personal exhibition ATAR OF CHILDREN'S DREAMS . Children's Rehabilitation Center, Odesa, Ukraine
- 2003 Exhibition "Decorative and Applied Art of Ukraine of the ХХ century, 200 names". Ukrainian House, Kyiv
- 2005 Personal exhibition "7305". Museum of Western & Oriental Arts, Odesa (Ukraine)
- 2010 First prize in the international competition for the creation of the memorial and museum complex "Babi Yar" Kyiv, Ukraine
- 2014 Participation in the exhibition "Ukrainian Breakthrough" at the Center for Contemporary Art, Odesa.
- 2015 Established Charity Foundation Reva (Ukraine)
- 2019 Exhibition REVELATION at Odesa Fine Arts Museum, Ukraine
- 2023 Exhibition SCRUTINY OF EVIL at Odesa Fine Arts Museum, Ukraine
- 2024 Exhibition SCRUTINY of EVIL at the U.S. Embassy's storied Hotel de Talleyrand, city halls of Paris' 3rd and 15th districts, Paris (France)
- 2025 Exhibition DIARIES OF TIME at Union Cultural Centre Odesa, Ukraine

== Art works ==
- 1988, 1990, 1994 Design of "Grand Award" for the International Film Festival "Golden Duke". Odesa
- 1993 The fountain SOURCE OF LIFE dedicated to the 200th anniversary of Odesa
- 1994-1995 Bas-reliefs FOUR SIDES OF THE WORLD to the monumental sculpture of Ernst Neizvestny THE GOLDEN CHILD, Odesa
- 1996 Monumental sculpture ANGEL OF GRACE installed over the entrance to the rehabilitation center for disabled children, Odesa
- 1997 A complex of fountains on a biblical theme for the residence of the US ambassador in Kyiv, Ukraine
- 1997 The project THE SLAVIC SHRINES for the National Treasury of Ukraine.
- 1998 Peter Berg Prize OVERCOMING THE IMPOSSIBLE, ordered by the National Geographic Society of Great Britain
- 1999 Competition project of monumental sculpture ADAM'S APPLE commissioned by Amsterdam, Netherlands
- 1999 Sculpture THE 12th CHAIR, Odesa Central Park
- 2001 Competition project of the monumental sculpture CRYSTAL DREAM for the public project "3 Acres on the Lake", Chicago (US)
- 2003 Sculptures in business center LEONARDO, Kyiv
- 2005 Monument MEMORY OF WORLDWIDE TERRORISM VICTIMS Kyiv
- 2006 Sculptural composition TREE OF LOVE Odesa
- 2006 Sculptural composition HEART OF THE WORLD Children's Rehabilitation Center, Odesa
- 2007 Interior design of Intercontinental Hotel, Kyiv
- 2007-2008 Sculpture THE GRAIN OF LIFE with Angelo Farion, Moscow
- 2009 Concept of architectural project for the memorial and museum complex "Babi Yar", Kyiv
- 2009 Fountain (bronze, golden leaf) in the atrium of Intercontinental Hotel, Kyiv
- 2011 Architectural project of the monument of Issac Babel with sculptor Georgy Frangulyan, Odesa
- 2012 Sculptural composition CITY CENTER Odesa
- 2012 The project TRILOGY OF GRAPE VINE at Shabo Wine Culture Center, Odesa Region
- 2015 Park sculpture ODESSA'S TIME, Odesa Central Park
- 2016 The tomb of Bogdan Stupka, Kiev (Ukraine)
- 2017 Sculpture DOMUS SOLIS, beachside Odesa
- 2018 VIOLIN SOUL for The International Pedagogy Award of Honor, Foundation Sion Violin Music, Switzerland
- 2018 Fountain ORIGIN OF INCEPTION Greek Park, Odesa
- 2018 Sculptural composition PARTICLES OF LIFE in Odrex Medical House, Odesa
- 2019 Sculpture MORE BOOKS, LESS FEAR, next to Odesa National Scientific Library
- 2021 Sculptures EDEM and BIRTH OF THE SOUL, the Greek Park, Odesa
- 2022-2024 Sculptures and paintings for movable exhibition SCRUTINY OF EVIL
- 2024 Sculpture EPIPHANY NOW, Odesa

== Gallery ==
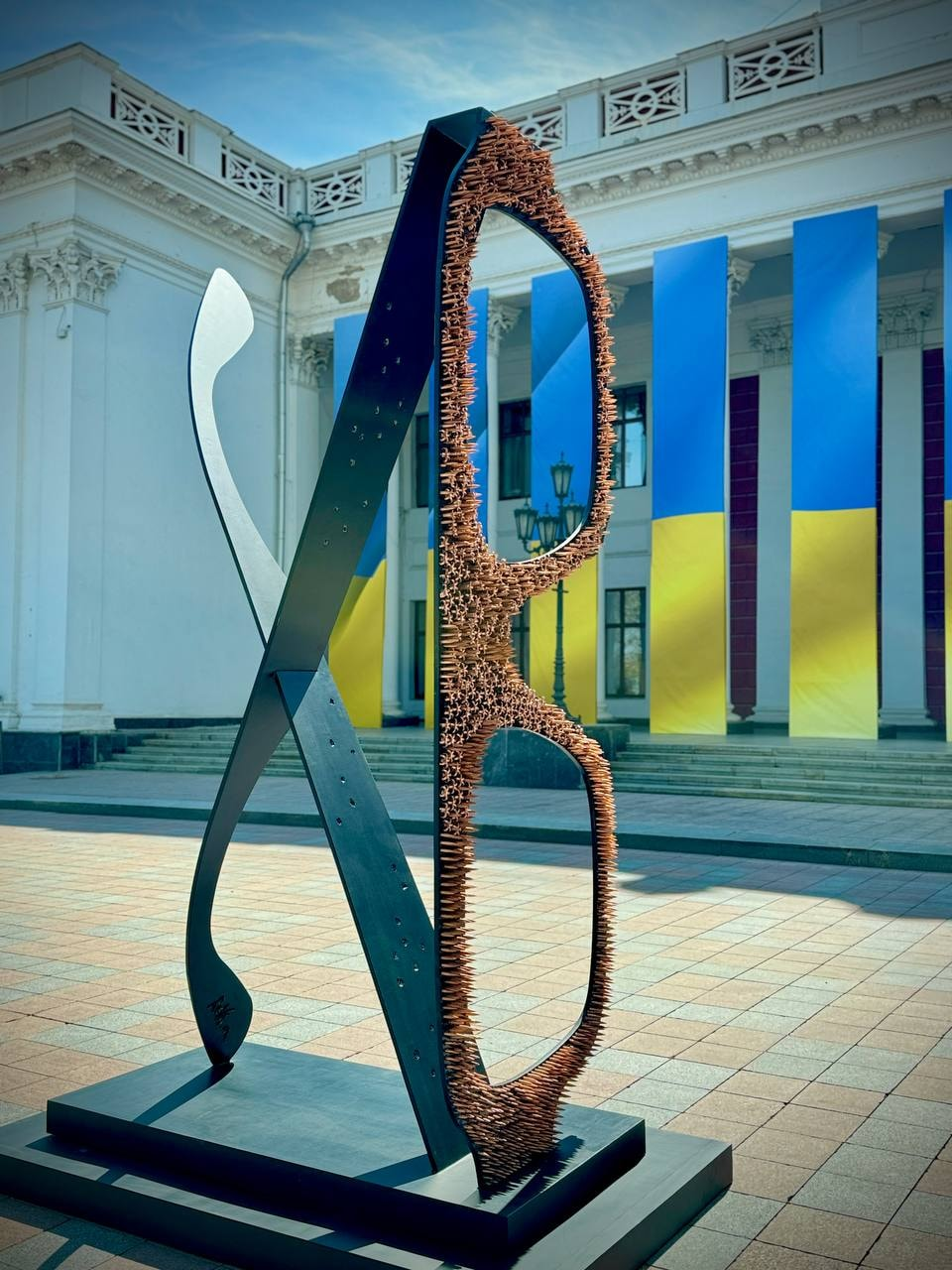
EPIPHANY NOW

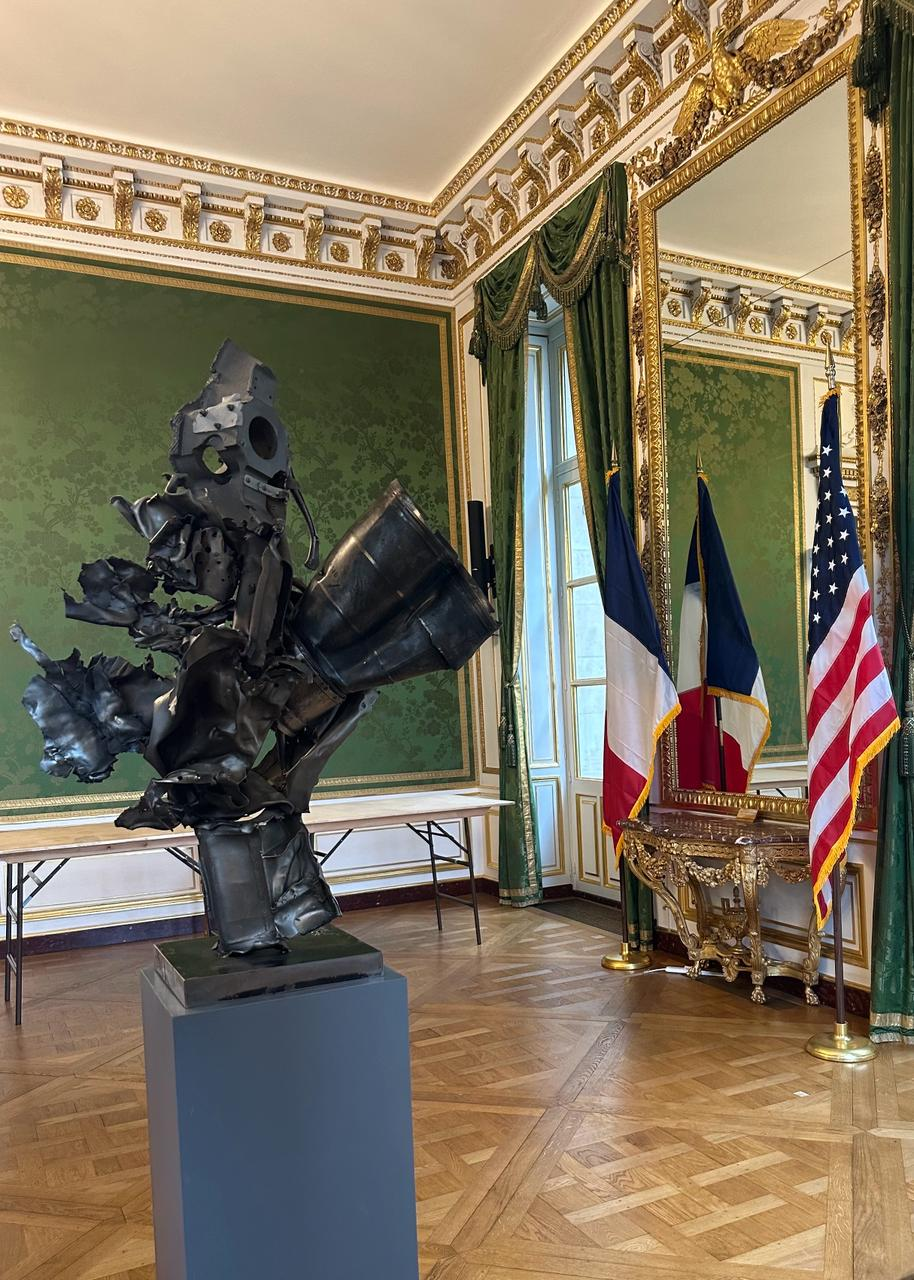
Exhibition at the U.S. Embassy's storied Hotel de Talleyrand in Paris, 2024

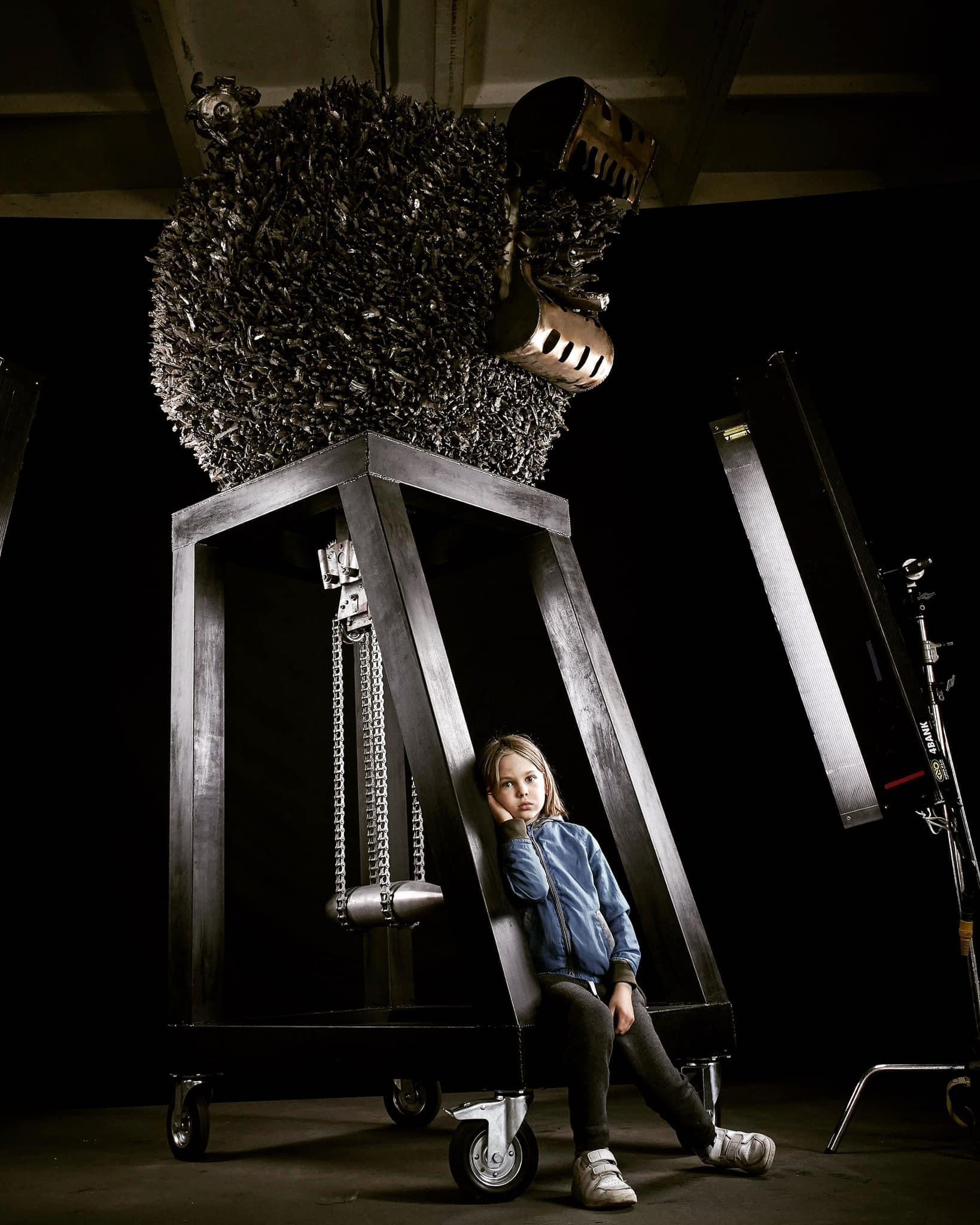
Moloch - the Beast of War

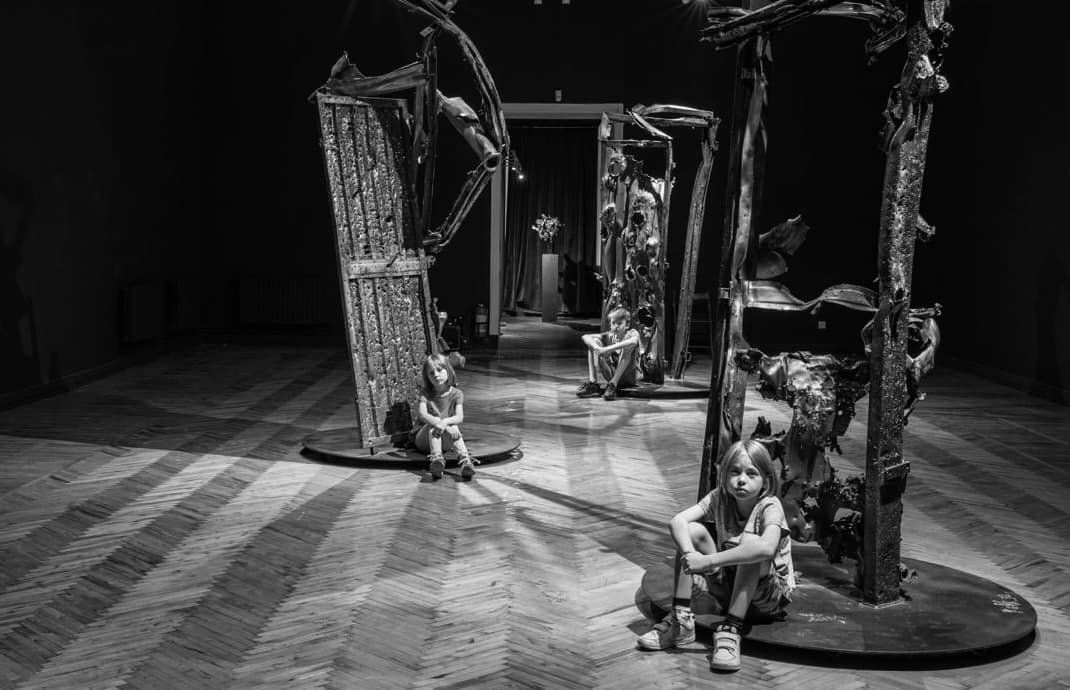
Exhibition at Odesa Fine Art Museum, 2023

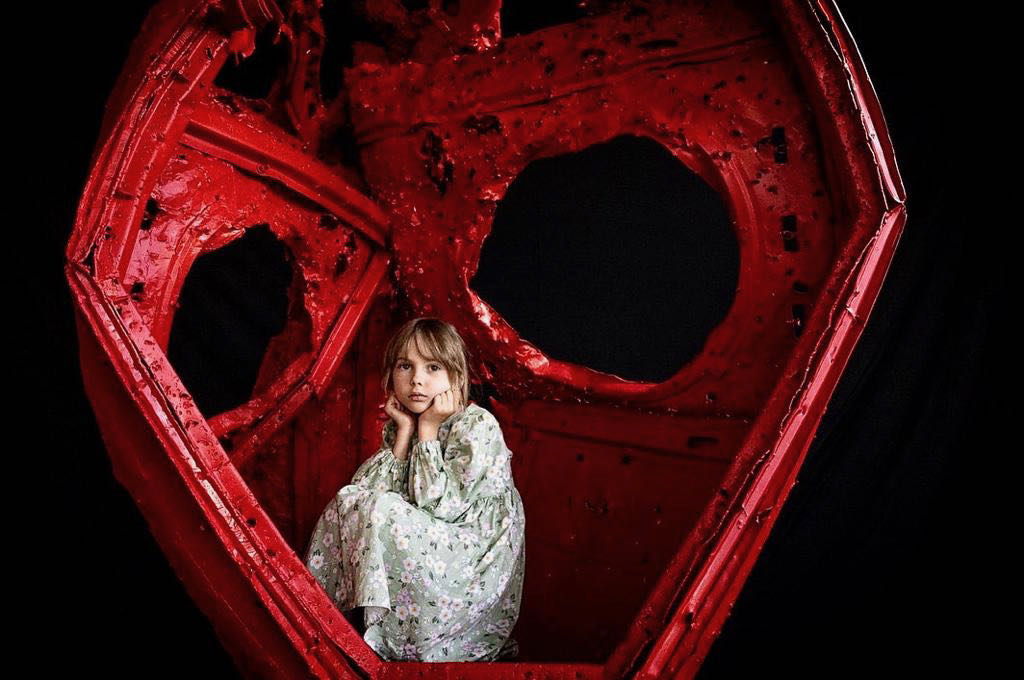
Red Dragon

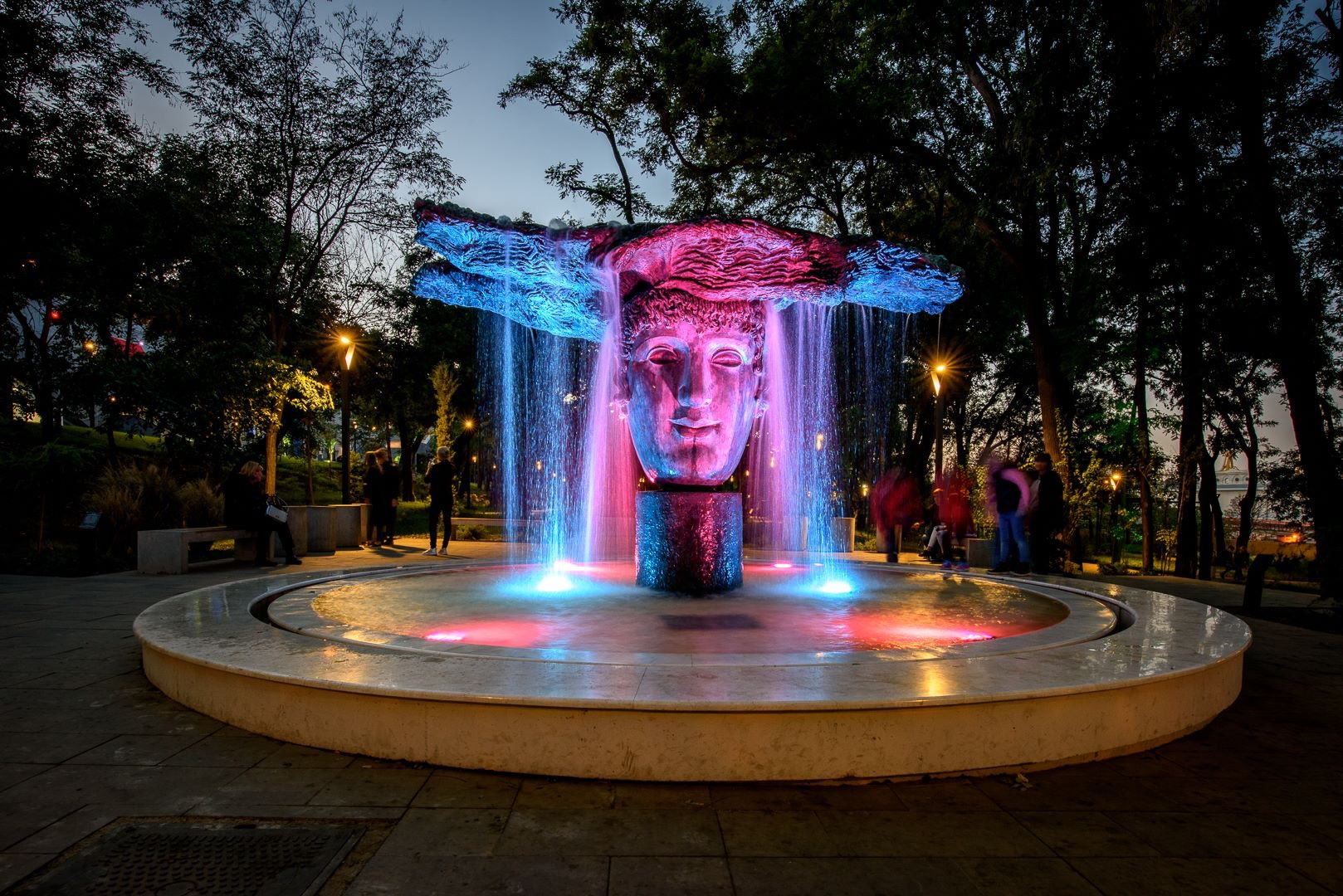
Fountain "Origin of Inception", the Greek Park, Odesa

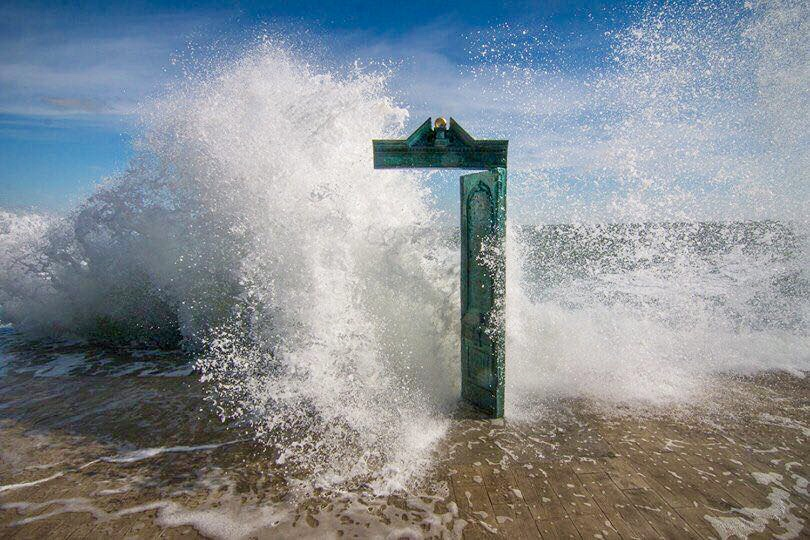
Sculpture "DOMUS SOLIS", Odesa

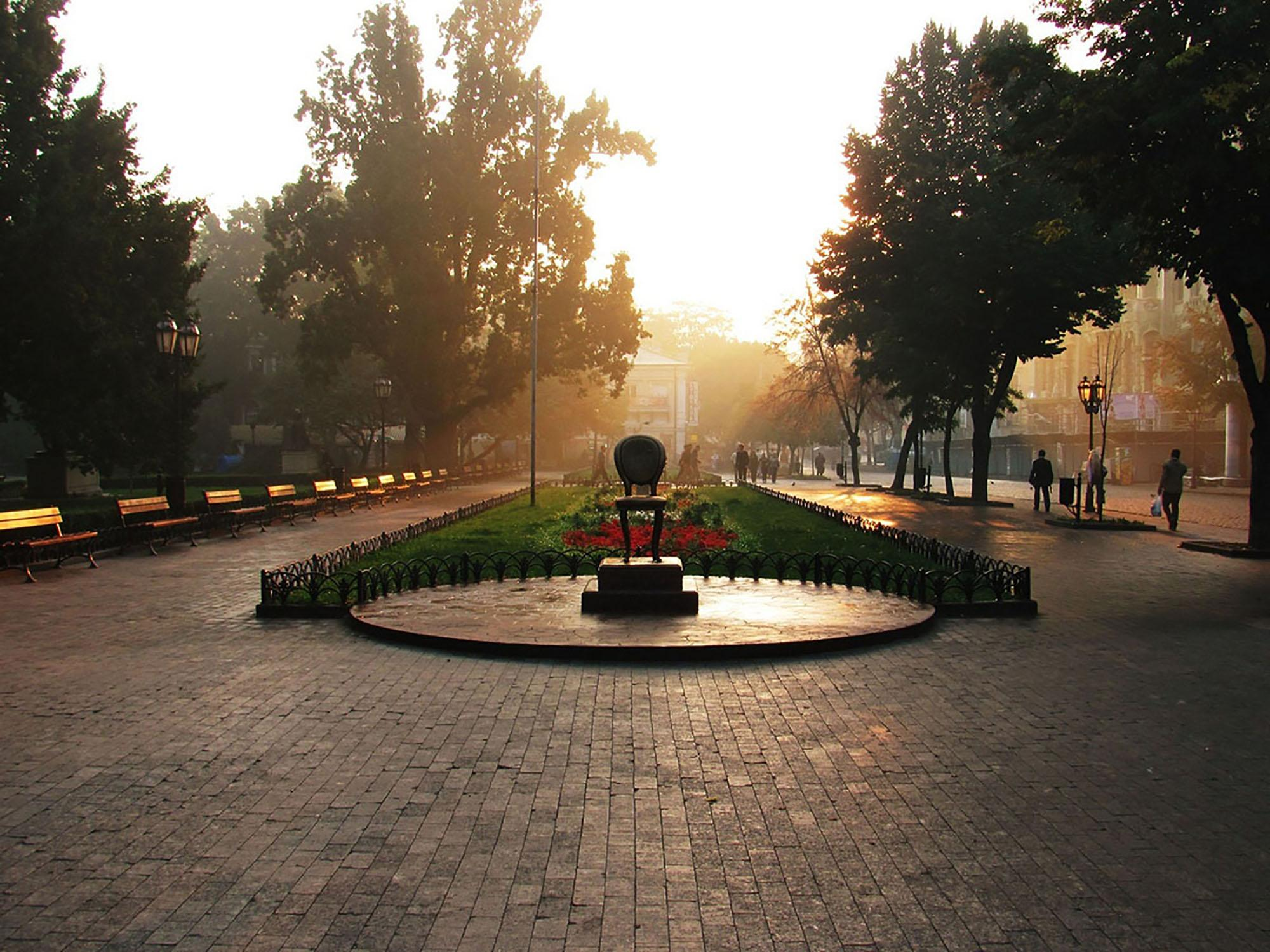
"12th Chair" Deribasovskaya St., Odesa

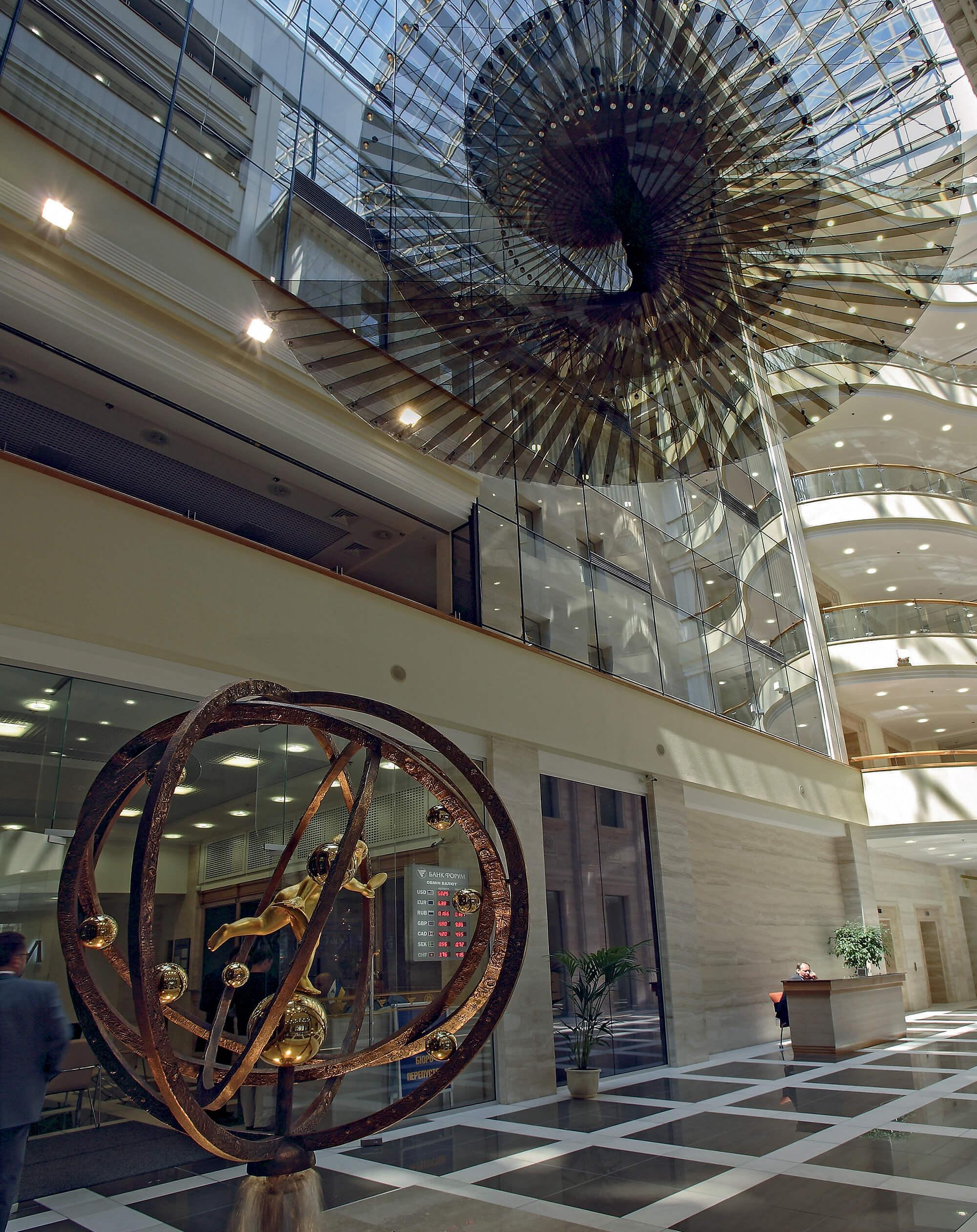
Business center "Leonardo", Kyiv, Ukraine

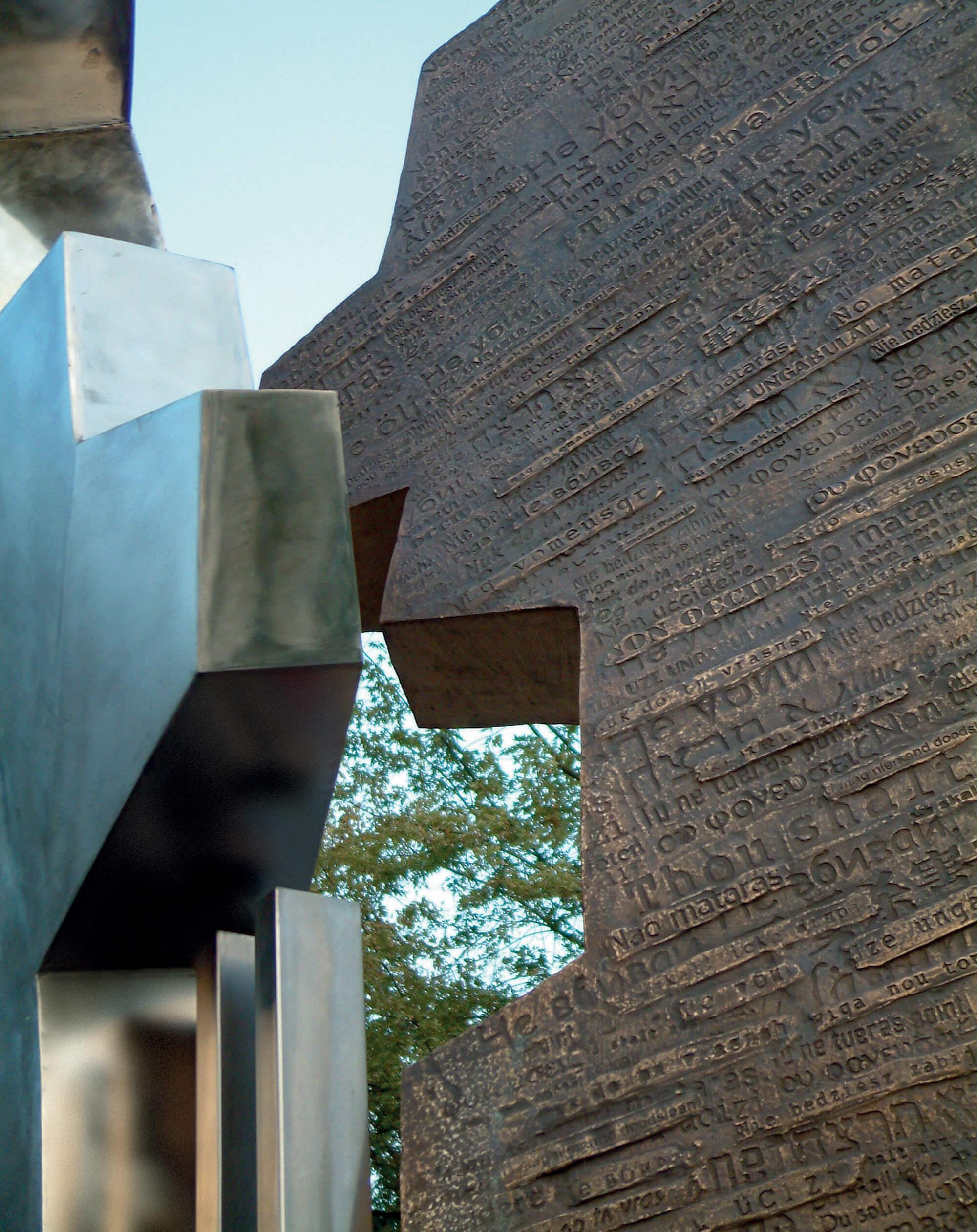
Monument "In memory of the victims of terrorism around the world" Kyiv, Ukraine

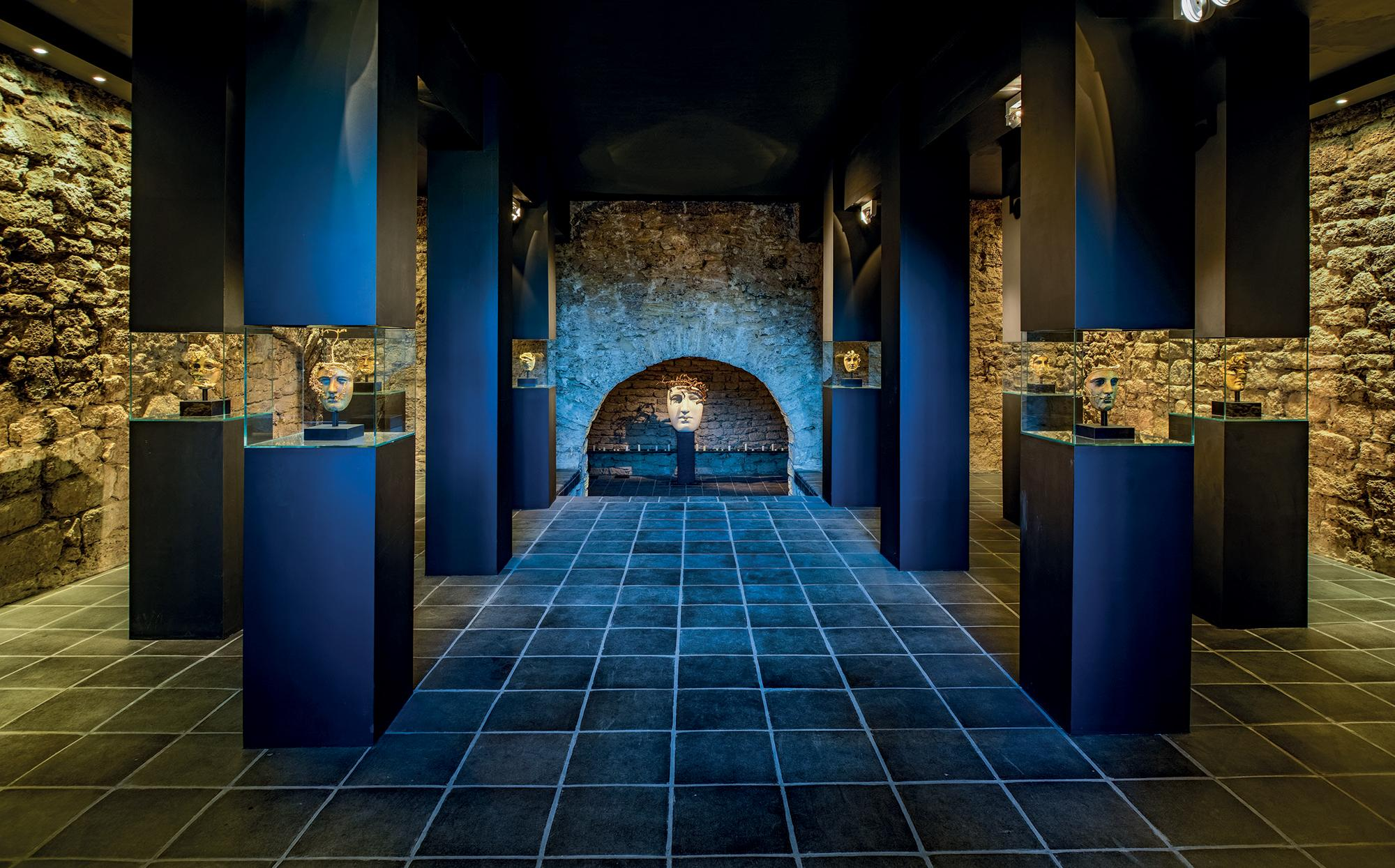
"Masks" for the wine culture center "Shabo" Odesa Oblast

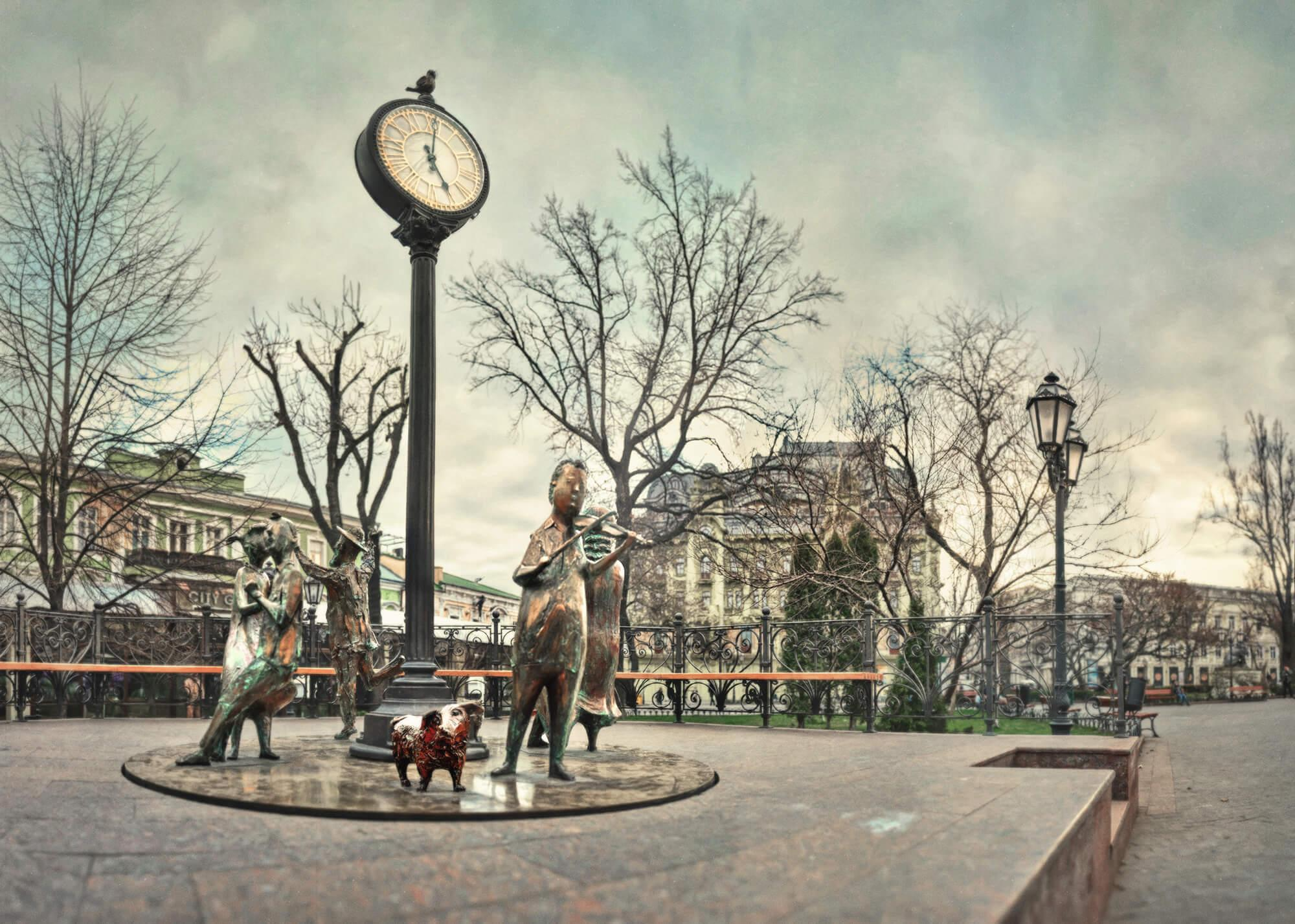
Park Sculpture "Odessa Time" City Garden, Odesa

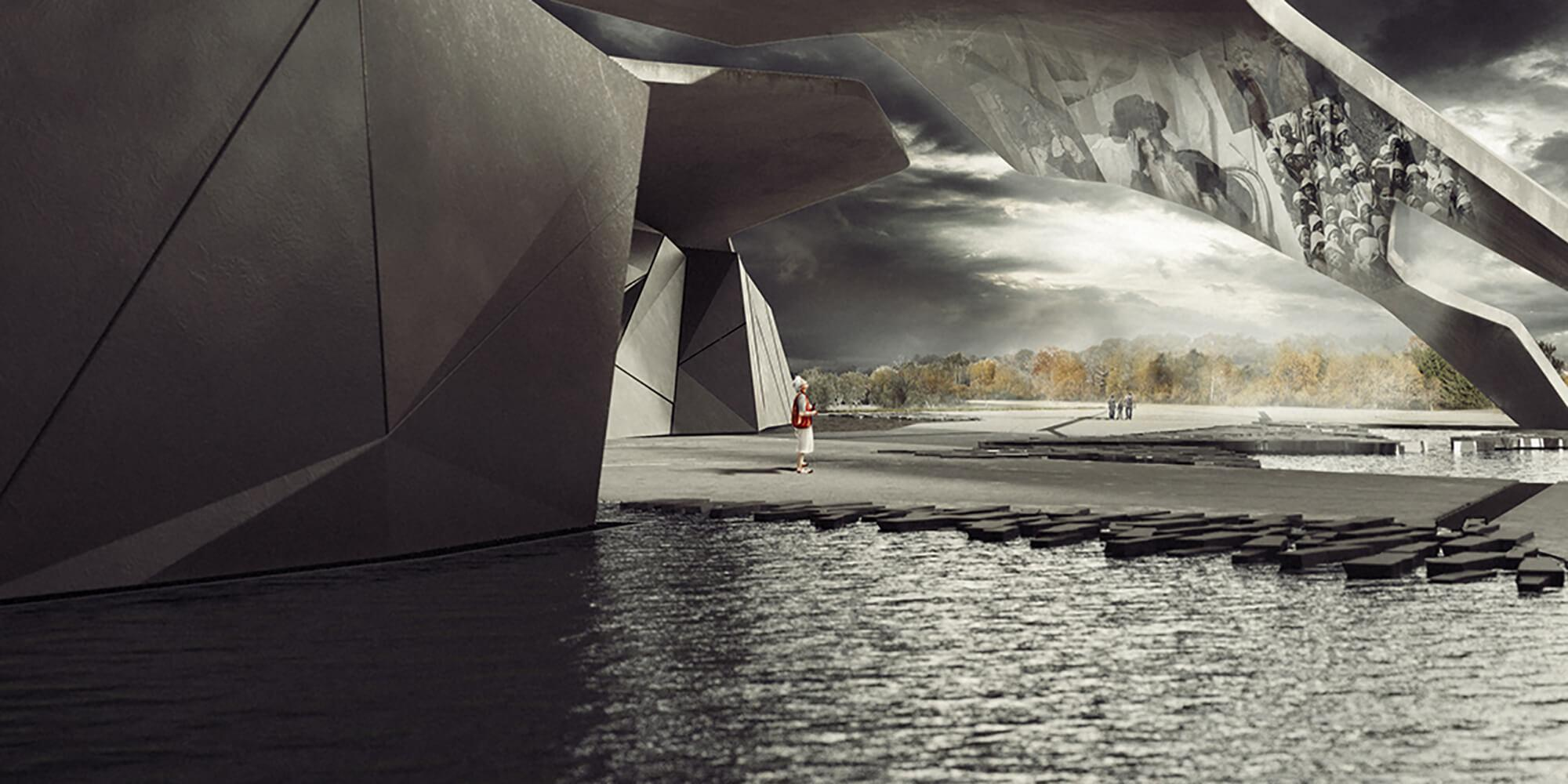
Architectural project of the memorial and museum complex "Babi Yar" Kyiv, Ukraine

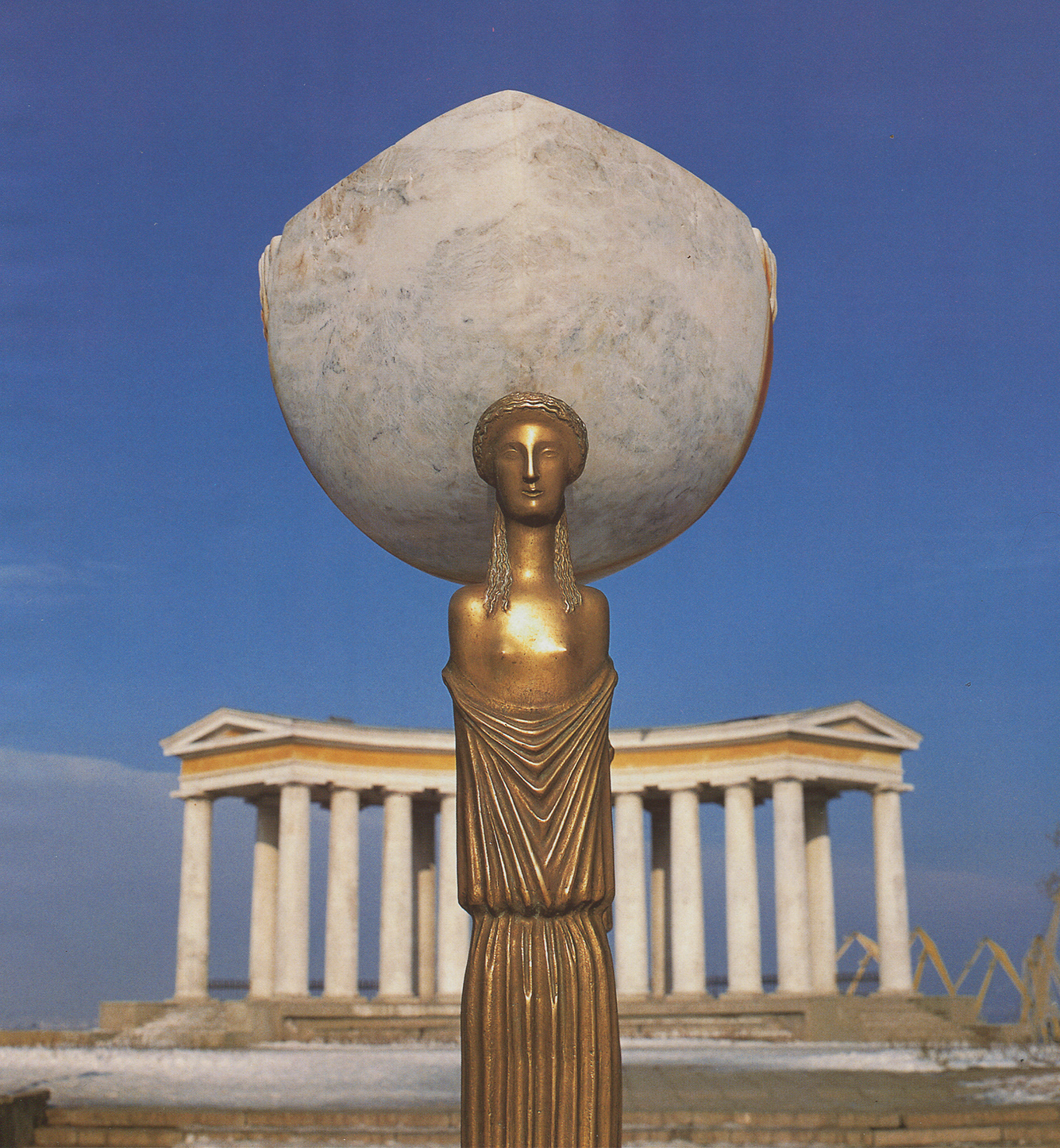
1993 The fountain "Source of Life" dedicated to the 200th anniversary of Odesa

== Publications ==
- La Divina Commedia rivive in Ucraina nell'opera di Reva @ ANSA (Italy)
- The Four Horsemen of the Apocalypse by Ugo Poletti @ Kyiv Post (Ukraine)
- Seeing Love and Resurrection During Wartime: Mikhail Reva Unveils His New Sculpture in Odesa by Ugo Poletti @ Kyiv Post (Ukraine)
- Mikhail Reva: Stirring the Soul – With Shrapnel Transformed Into Art by Stash Luczkiw @ Kyiv Post (Ukraine)
- L'arma segreta dell'Ucraina: l'arte di Mikhail Reva di Anna Husarska @ IL FOGLIO (Italy)
- Ukrainian sculptor's haunting artworks made from war debris go on display in Paris by Theo Farrant @ EuroNews (Belgium)
- Ukraine's most famous sculptor turns war debris into art, expressing the inexpressible by Thomas Adamson @ Associated Press (US)
- Ukraine's secret weapon: Art by Anna Husarska @ The Washington Post (US)
- After an artist's studio was damaged in a Russian missile strike, he found a new medium: war debris by Laura King @ Los Angeles Times (US)
- 'My vendetta against Putin': the Ukrainian sculptor whose haunting work is shaped by war by Luke Harding @ The Guardian (UK)
- Moloch on an Odesa Beach by Blair A. Ruble @ Wilson Center
- Le sculture di Odessa, l'orrore e la memoria che invade il presente by Adriano Sofri @ IL FOGLIO (Italy)
- Mikhail Reva, el escultor ucraniano que hace obras con lo que la guerra le deja by Omar Genovese @ PERFIL (Argentina)
- Ukrajinski umjetnik izradio je sat Putinu za rođendan, a danas je izbjeglica: 'Ne zaslužuje ga' by Dijana Marić Odobašić @ 24SATA (Croatia)
- Poznati ukrajinski umjetnik, o kojem opširno piše i Wikipedia, bježeći od rata našao utočište u Rapcu by Branko Biočić @ Glas Istre (Croatia)
- New sculptures by Reva installed in the Odessa Greek park by Ugo Poletti @ The Odessa Journal (Ukraine)
- Odessa artist: Mikhail Reva by Ugo Poletti @ The Odessa Journal (Ukraine)
