= Frangulyan =

Frangulyan or Frangulian (Armenian: Ֆրանգուլյան) is an Armenian surname. Notable people with the surname include:

- Georgy Frangulyan, Soviet and Russian sculptor of Armenian descent;
- Rozalia Frangulyan (1925-1986), Armenian film director and screenwriter. Honored Artist of the Armenian SSR;
- Valodya Frangulyan, Armenian wrestler.
