= Sergey Skuratov (architect) =

Russian architect (born 1955)

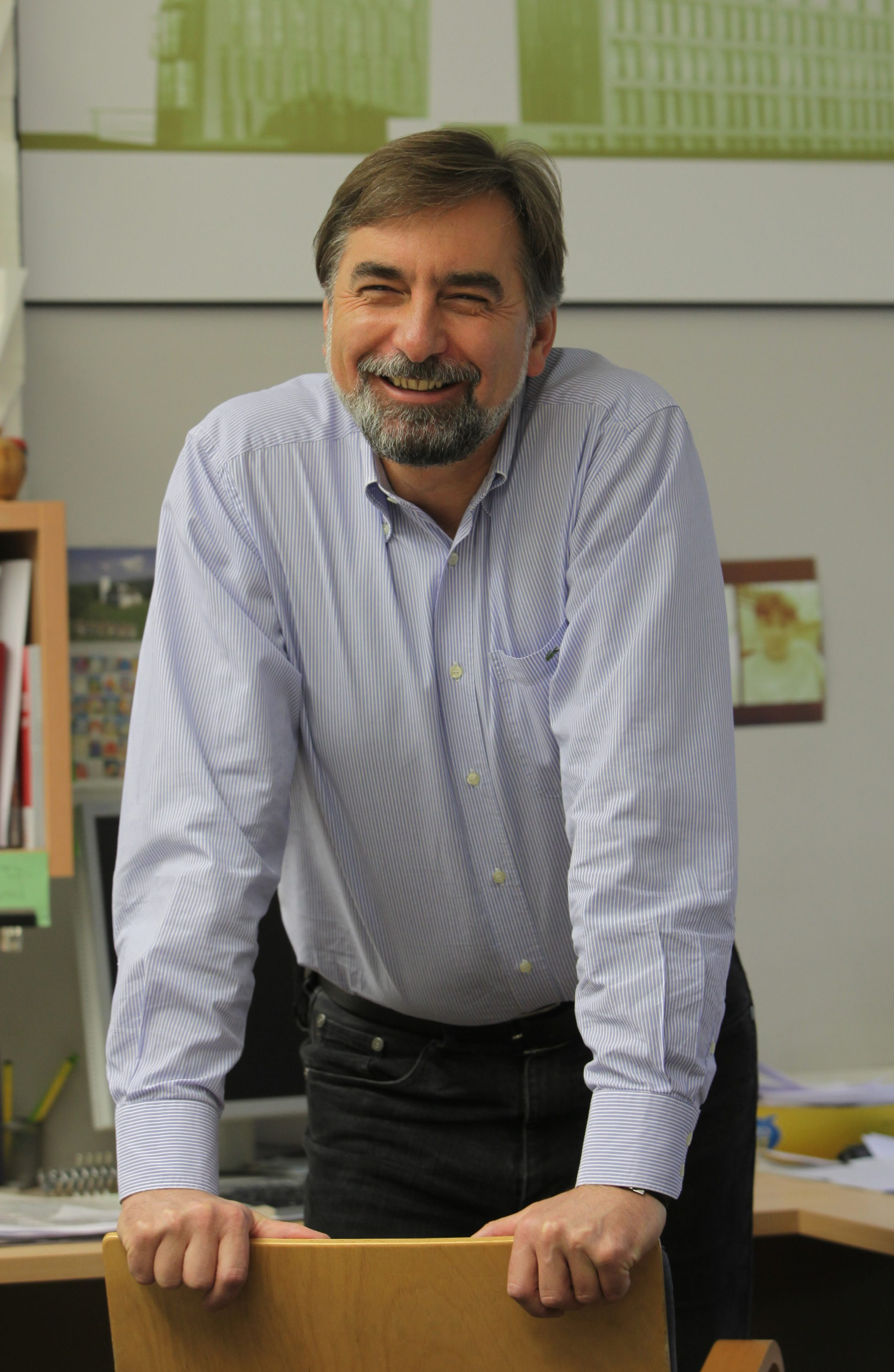
- Sergey Skuratov
- Born: 1955 (age 69–70); Moscow, Russian SFSR, Soviet Union
- Occupation: Architect
- Awards: Golden Section 1995, 1997, 2003, 2013, Architect of the Year at Arch Moscow 2008
- Buildings: Copper House, Moscow; House on Mosfilmovskaya, Moscow; Capital Towers, Moscow; Sadovye Kvartaly, Moscow
- Projects: One Tower, Moscow (initial design)

Sergey Skuratov (born 1955) is a Russian architect known for his residential buildings, including skyscrapers such as the Capital Towers and the House on Mosfilmovskaya.

== Early life and education ==
Born in 1955, Skuratov graduated from the Moscow Architectural Institute in 1979.

== Career ==
He started working as an architect at the Mezentsev Residential Design Institute (ЦНИИЭП жилища). In 1988, at the height of the Perestroika, he went to work for a private architecture studio, and in 2002 founded his own, Sergey Skuratov Architects.

Skuratov and his team designed the Copper House, the first building in Russia to be clad in patinated copper sheets, complemented by tilted sheets of green glass. The Copper House was awarded the Golden Section Award by the Union of Moscow Architects, was showcased at the Shchusev Museum of Architecture and received several other distinctions.

Over the following two decades, Skuratov and his team designed - and oversaw the construction of - over 30 different buildings and entire blocks in Moscow. Skuratov participated in the design of the Russian pavilion for the Venice Biennale of 2010. The following year, his first skyscraper, a tower of characteristic twisted shape, was completed as part of the House on Mosfilmovskaya on the edge of the Sparrow Hills in Moscow. At the same time, Skuratov co-authored the Monument to Joseph Brodsky with sculptor Georgy Frangulyan. Other notable projects included Danilovsky Fort, Art House, Capital Towers, and entire blocks of residential buildings at Sadovye Kvartaly and at Sofiyskaya Embankment.

Extensive use of various, sometimes unusual types of brick and metal is characteristic of Skuratov's work, as is the search for new, plastic, striking shapes; in his own words,

I was fascinated by how earth and clay transform into brick and the use of brick cladding on all kinds of surfaces, including along a curved wall. I like the idea of giving a whole building a sculptural form. These contemplations were initiated by my visits to the ancient Russian monasteries in such regions as Solovki or Pskov — and also Kensington in London and Bologna in Italy.

— Sergey Skuratov

In 2015, Skuratov was elected member of the International Academy of Architecture.

In 2025, it was announced that construction work on several blocks of residential buildings designed by Sergey Skuratov Architects on the land of the former airport in Kazan would start in 2026.
