= Ho Chi Minh Monument, Moscow =

Monument in Moscow, Russia

Coordinates: 55°41′16.7″N 37°34′29.3″E

- памятник Хо Ши Мину
- Interactive map of Ho Chi Minh Monument, Moscow
- Location: Akademicheskaya metro station
- Designer: Vladimir Tsigal, Roman Grigoryevich Kananin
- Type: Statue and pedestal
- Material: Bronze, stone
- Height: 7.9 metres (26 ft) (statue), 12.5 metres (41 ft) (including pedestal)
- Weight: 15 tonnes (15 long tons; 17 short tons)
- Dedicated date: May 18, 1990
- Dedicated to: Ho Chi Minh

The Ho Chi Minh monument (Russian: памятник Хо Ши Мину) is a monument located in Akademichesky District, Moscow; just next to one of the entrances of Akademicheskaya metro station. It memorializes North Vietnamese president Ho Chi Minh, who was the chairman and founder of the Workers' Party of Vietnam. The monument was inaugurated on May 18, 1990, on the eve of Ho Chi Minh's 100th birthday.

== Description ==
The monument is made of bronze and stone, with a portrait of Ho Chi Minh embossed on a giant disc. Below the disc is a sculpture of a Vietnamese man rising from his knees. Behind the disc are images of tropical flowers and two curved bamboos. Below the monument is a quotation from Ho Chi Minh "Нет ничего дороже независимости, свободы" (transl. Nothing is more precious than independence, liberty).

The creators of the monument are the sculptor Vladimir Tsigal and architect Roman Grigoryevich Kananin. Tsigal visited Vietnam in 1985 to research Ho Chi Minh for his project. According to him, the round disc is "the image of Vietnam's sun, representing the dream for a bright future for Vietnam", and he used the image of the two curved bamboos "stemming from the understanding of the emblematic Vietnamese plant: the bamboo can be curved, but it's difficult to break, similar to the will and strength of Vietnam."

The entire project costed about 1 million ₽.

== History ==
Ho Chi Minh Square was inaugurated in 1969, after the death of Ho Chi Minh. In 1985, the Central Committee and Council of Ministers of the Soviet Union decided to create a monument at the square. This decision was seen as counter to Ho Chi Minh's wishes, whose last testament requested no statues or monuments made in his honor.

The construction of the monument generated controversy among some Muscovites. Firstly, they contended that breaking down trees and bringing in granite caused aesthetic and ecological damage to the area. Secondly, they believed that the cost of more than 1 million roubles for the monument could be better used to build 150 good apartments, helping to alleviate the housing situation in the city. On April 4, 1990, students in Moscow organized a rally to call on the government to strictly fulfill Ho Chi Minh's will. They demanded that the government dismantle the monument, sell it to Vietnam, and restore the square to its original condition. According to them, Ho Chi Minh had requested thrice in his wills that people honor him by planting trees, not by building monuments. A representative from the government replied that since Vietnam already had a monument to Lenin, the USSR should have a monument to Ho Chi Minh to reciprocate. According to the representative, the square had already been ruined and the government had already spent 200,000 roubles at the construction site and 500,000 roubles to cast the sculptures.

On May 18, 1990, on the eve of Ho Chi Minh's 100th birthday, the Ho Chi Minh monument was inaugurated.

During the collapse of the Soviet Union, some people demanded the demolition of the monument due to its association with authoritarianism. The Moscow government in 1991 wanted to destroy the monument. This idea was opposed by those sympathetic to Vietnam, such as the cosmonaut Gherman Stepanovich Titov, and Vietnamese diplomats, who suggested moving the statue to the Embassy of Vietnam in Moscow. However, the monument still stood at its original location to this day.

== Usage today ==
Muscovites nickname the monument the "flying saucer monument" (памятник летающей тарелке) because of its similar shape. In slang, it is also called the "rouble" (рубль) because of its similarity to the commemorative rouble with the portrait of Lenin. Some people satirically call it the "monument commemorating 300 years of the Mongol-Tatar yoke" (памятник 300-летию татаро-монгольского ига).

For former Soviet advisors who served during the Vietnam War, the monument serves as the annual meeting location on the occasion of Ho Chi Minh's birthday, at 10 a.m.

The monument is often visited by members of the Vietnamese community in Russia, who use it as a public gathering place, as well as a wedding venue. Functionaries from Vietnam also often visit the monument and place wreaths of flowers.
