= Fyodor Tolbukhin =

Soviet military commander and Marshal of the Soviet Union (1894–1949)

Marshal of the Soviet Union Fyodor Ivanovich Tolbukhin
- Фёдор Иванович Толбухин
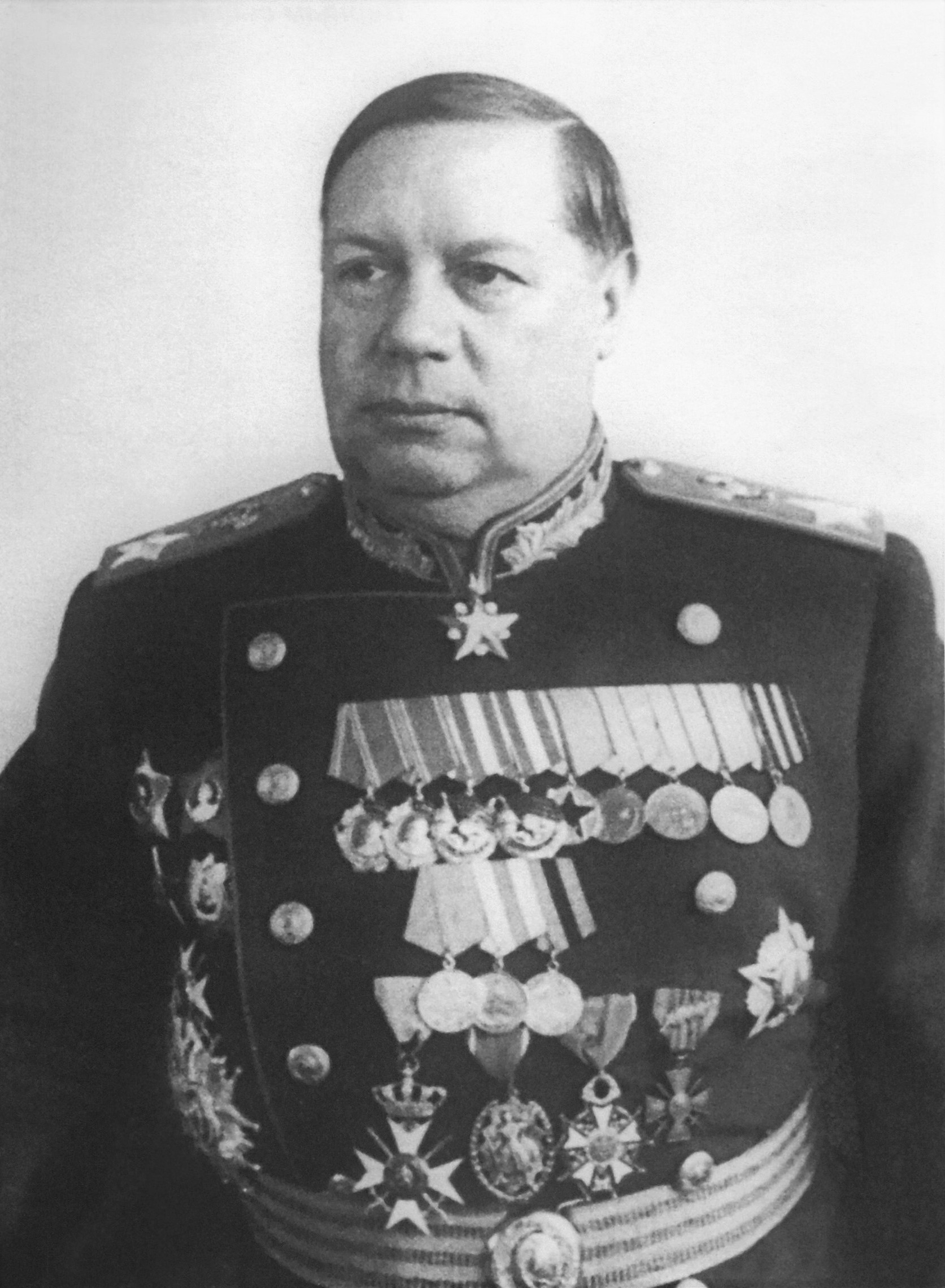
- Fyodor Tolbukhin in 1945
- Born: 16 June 1894; Androniki, Yaroslavl Governorate, Russian Empire
- Died: 17 October 1949 (aged 55); Moscow, Russian SFSR, Soviet Union
- Burial place: Kremlin Wall Necropolis
- Education: M. V. Frunze Military Academy
- Military career
- Allegiance: Russian Empire (1914–1917); Soviet Russia (1917–1922); Soviet Union (1922–1949)
- Branch: Imperial Russian Army; Red Army; Soviet Army
- Service years: 1914–1949
- Rank: Marshal of the Soviet Union (1944–1949)
- Nickname: Fedya
- Commands: 4th Ukrainian Front; 3rd Ukrainian Front; Transcaucasian Military District
- Conflicts: World War I Russian Civil War; World War II
- Awards: Hero of the Soviet Union; Order of Victory

Fyodor Ivanovich Tolbukhin (Russian: Фёдор Ива́нович Толбу́хин; 16 June 1894 – 17 October 1949) was a Soviet military commander and Marshal of the Soviet Union. He is regarded as one of the finest Soviet generals of World War II.

Born into a peasant family in Yaroslavl, Tolbukhin volunteered for the Imperial Russian Army during the First World War and served with distinction. He joined the Red Army in 1918 and fought in the Russian Civil War. After graduating from the Frunze Military Academy, he held a succession of commands, rising to the post of chief of staff of the Transcaucasian Military District by 1938. Tolbukhin rose further through the ranks following the German invasion of the Soviet Union, and was involved in the Battle of Stalingrad. As commander of the 4th Ukrainian Front, he assisted Rodion Malinovsky in the Lower Dnieper and Dnieper–Carpathian offensives. He then contributed to the Soviet drive into the Balkans and forced Romania's defection to the Allies, for which he was named a Marshal of the Soviet Union. Afterwards, Tolbukhin took part in the occupation of Bulgaria and liberated much of Yugoslavia after the Belgrade offensive. He commanded the Vienna offensive in May 1945 and helped set up the new Austrian government under Karl Renner.

After the war, Tolbukhin received command of the Southern Group of Forces in the Balkans before returning to the Transcaucasus. He held the post until his death in October 1949 from diabetes.

== Early life and military career ==
Tolbukhin was born into a peasant family in the province of Androniki, near Moscow. After the death of his father in 1907 his family moved to St. Petersburg.

He volunteered for the Imperial Army in 1914 at the outbreak of World War I. The following year he completed an officer training program and became the commander of an infantry regiment. He was seriously wounded during 1917, and was demobilized as a result of his injuries in 1918. During the autumn of 1918, Tolbukhin joined the Red Army, where he served as a military commissar in Yaroslavl Oblast.

After the Russian Civil War ended (1921), Tolbukhin was given a number of staff positions. He also attended the Frunze Military Academy for advanced staff training, graduating in 1931. In 1937, after a series of staff positions, Tolbukhin was given command of a division. In 1938, he was made chief of staff of the Transcaucasus Military District.

== World War II ==
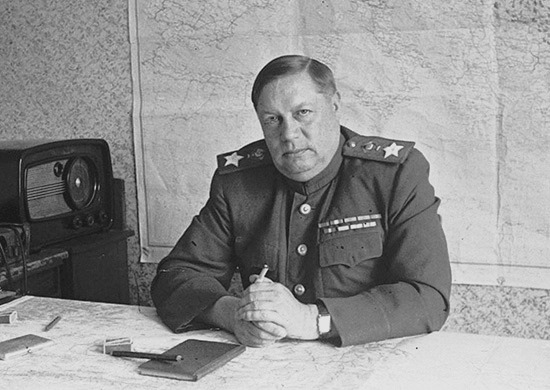
Tolbukhin in 1944

Tolbukhin remained in this position through the opening phases of Operation Barbarossa until August 1941, when he was made the chief of staff of the Crimean Front, which he held until March 1942. From May to July 1942, he was the assistant commander of the Stalingrad Military District. After that, he was the commander of the 57th Army until March 1943. The 57th was involved in the Battle of Stalingrad, where Tolbukhin's superior, Colonel-General Andrei Yeremenko, praised his command organization and military prowess. After his command of the 57th, Tolbukhin was placed in command of the Southern Front.

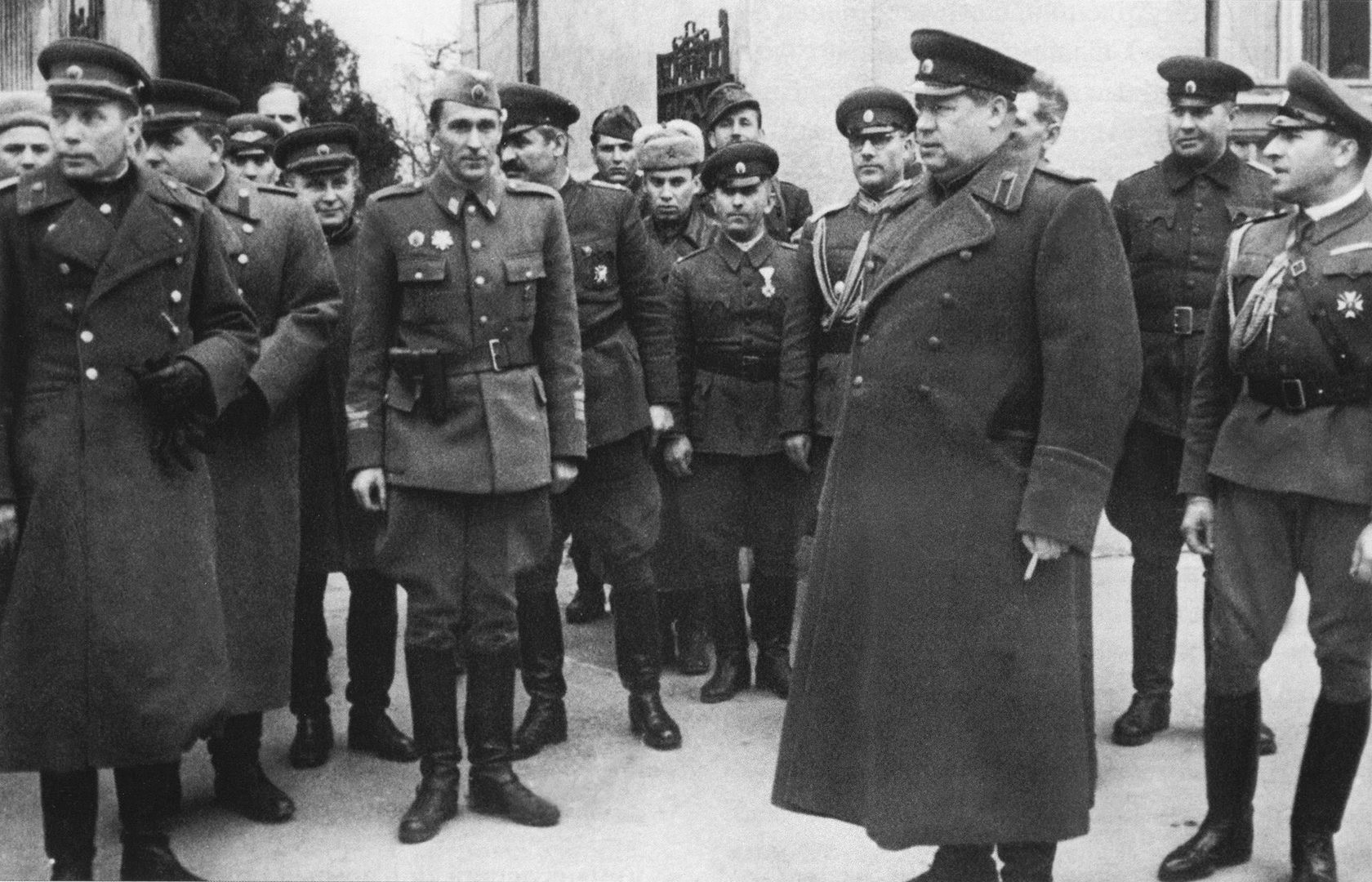
Marshal Tolbukhin inspects units of the Bulgarian First Army, Autumn 1944

In October 1943, the Southern Front was renamed 4th Ukrainian Front. Tolbukhin assisted Rodion Malinovsky's 3rd Ukrainian Front in the Lower Dnieper Offensive and Dnieper–Carpathian Offensive. In May 1944, Tolbukhin was transferred to control of 3rd Ukrainian Front. During the Summer Campaign, from June to October 1944, Tolbukhin and Malinovsky launched their invasion of the Balkans and were able to conquer most of Romania. On September 12, 1944, two days after Malinovsky was promoted to Marshal of the Soviet Union, Tolbukhin was promoted to the same rank. While Malinovsky moved northwest, towards Hungary and Yugoslavia, Tolbukhin occupied Bulgaria. Starting in the Winter Campaign, Tolbukhin shifted his army to the northwest axis, thereby liberating much of Yugoslavia and invading southern Hungary.

In late April 1945, at the end of the Battle of Vienna, Tolbukhin acted on Stalin's order to entrust Karl Renner with foundation of a new provisional Austrian government in order to prepare democratic elections. On 27 April, Renner was appointed provisional government leader, at Tolbukhin's authority, which renders the latter an important role in the foundation of a new Austrian republic that had been integrated into the Third Reich (1938–1945). Tolbukhin gave the go-ahead at the location, for this important step towards an independent Austria in the formation of the Second Republic (1945–present).

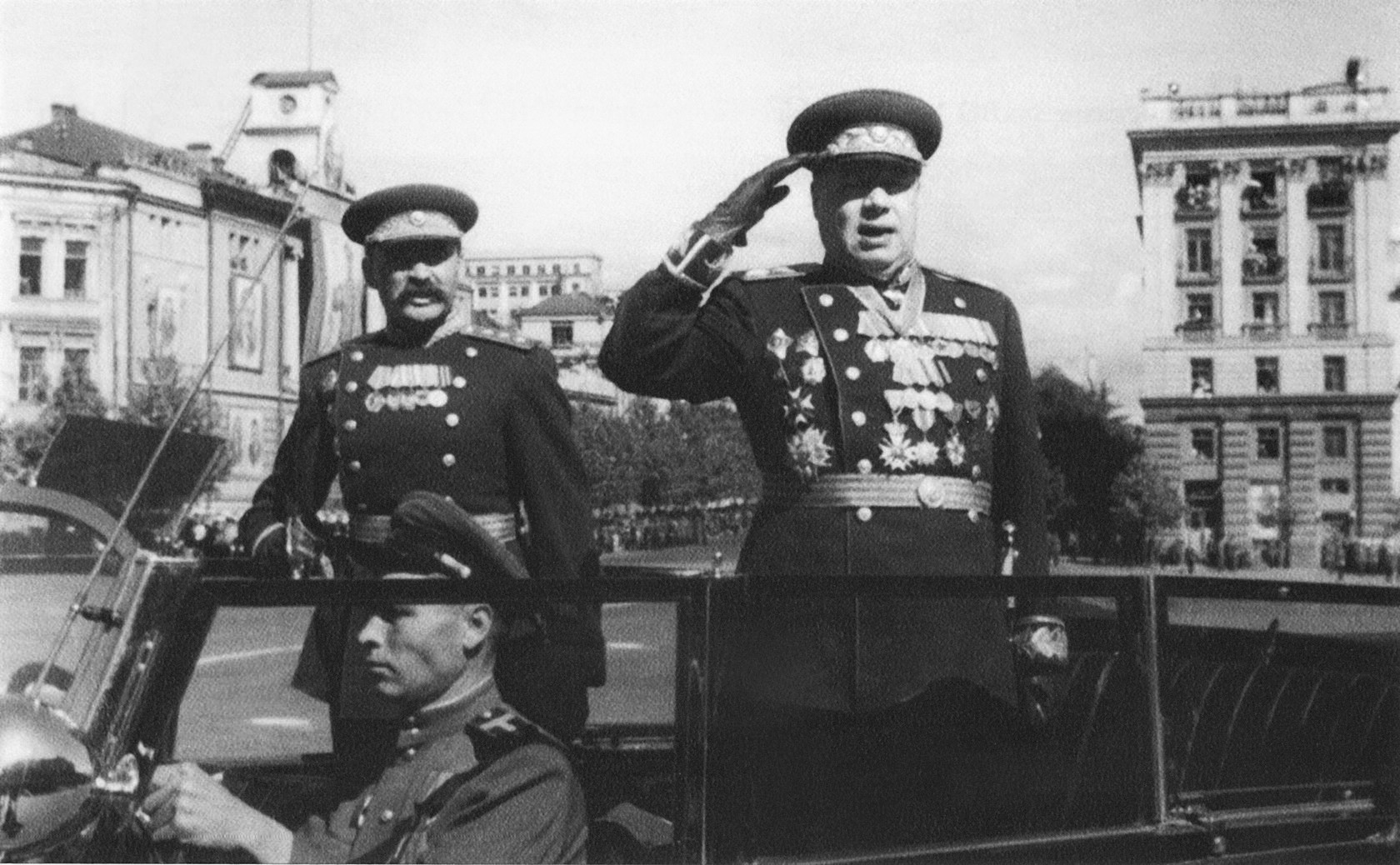
Marshal Tolbukhin at a military parade, Bucharest 1949

After the war, Tolbukhin was commander-in-chief of the Southern Group of Forces, which comprised the Balkan region. In January 1947, Tolbukhin was made the commander of the Transcaucasus Military District, a post he held until his death on October 17, 1949, due to complication from diabetes.

Tolbukhin is generally regarded as one of the finest Soviet generals of World War II. Meticulous, careful, and not overly ambitious like some Soviet commanders, Tolbukhin was well respected by fellow commanders and also his men, especially since he had a dedication to keeping casualty rates low. Tolbukhin was the recipient of numerous awards and medals including the highest Soviet medal and rank, the Order of Victory and Hero of the Soviet Union, respectively. Tolbukhin was also People's Hero of Yugoslavia, whose capital Belgrade he liberated. The urn containing his ashes is buried in the Kremlin Wall Necropolis, and there is a monument to him in his native Yaroslavl. The city of Dobrich in Bulgaria was renamed to Tolbukhin in his honor in 1949.

== Honours and awards ==
- Hero of the Soviet Union (7 May 1965, posthumously)
- Order of Victory (№ 9–26 April 1945)
- Two Orders of Lenin (incl. 19 March 1944, 21 February 1945)
- Order of Red Banner, three times (18 October 1922, 3 November 1944)
- Order of Suvorov, 1st class, twice (28 January 1943, 16 May 1944)
- Order of Kutuzov, 1st class (17 September 1943)
- Order of the Red Star (22 February 1938)
- Order of St. Anna, 3rd class
- Order of St. Stanislaus, 3rd class
- Order of the People's Hero (Yugoslavia, 31 May 1945)
- Hero of the People's Republic of Bulgaria (1979, posthumous)
- Order of Bravery (Bulgaria)
- Order of Georgi Dimitrov (Bulgaria)
- Legion of Merit Grade of Commander (United States)
- Order of the "Hungarian freedom"
- Grand Cross of the Order of "The Republic of Hungary"
- Grand Officer of the Legion of Honour (France)
- Honorary Citizen of Sofia and Belgrade
- To the Valiant Soldier of the Karelian Front
- Medal "For the Defence of Stalingrad"
- Medal "For the Victory over Germany in the Great Patriotic War 1941–1945"
- Medal "For the Capture of Budapest"
- Medal "For the Capture of Vienna"
- Medal "In Commemoration of the 800th Anniversary of Moscow"
- Jubilee Medal "XX Years of the Workers' and Peasants' Red Army"
- Medal "For the Liberation of Belgrade"
- Jubilee Medal "30 Years of the Soviet Army and Navy"

=== Memorials ===
The Bulgarian city of Dobrich was renamed Tolbukhin, a name it held until the fall of communism in 1989.

In Ukraine a Prospect (street) in Odesa holds his name. In December 2022 the Fyodor Tolbukhin street in Kyiv was renamed to Vasyl Danylevych street and the Fyodor Tolbukhin lane was renamed to Mykhailo Yalovy lane.

One of the main streets in Belgrade, the capital of Serbia, was named Marshal Tolbukhin Street (in Serbian: Улица маршала Толбухина / Ulica maršala Tolbuhina). The street was originally named Макензијева / Makenzijeva, after Scottish missionary Francis Mackenzie who purchased and developed this part of the city in the late 19th century. After the fall of Communism in Serbia and democratic changes in 2000, the name of the street was reverted to its original name. Instead, Goce Delčeva Street, in the new section of the city (New Belgrade) was renamed Boulevard of Marshal Tolbukhin (Булевар маршала Толбухина / Bulevar maršala Tolbuhina) in 2016.

The Laxenburger Straße in Vienna was named as Tolbuchinstraße between 1946 and 1956,

Budapest, the capital of Hungary also had one of its streets named after Tolbukhin, as he was one of the major Soviet commanders in the Hungarian war theatre. The previous Mészáros utca (Butchers' Street) was renamed Vámház körút (Custom House Boulevard) during the (re)construction of the area in 1875. The road was renamed after the Tsar of Bulgaria, Ferdinand in 1915, when Bulgaria joined the Central Powers in the First World War. In 1919 the road got back its old name, Vámház körút, which it bore until 1942, when it was once more renamed, this time after son of Regent of Hungary, Admiral Miklós Horthy, István Horthy. In 1945, the road was named after Marshal Tolbukhin (Tolbuhin Boulevard), and it held this name until 1990 with the fall of communism.

A Monument to Fyodor Tolbukhin was installed in 1960 in Moscow in the square on Samotychnaya Street. The authors of the monument are the sculptor L. E. Kerbel and the architect G. A. Zakharov.
