= House on Mosfilmovskaya =

Mosfilm Tower
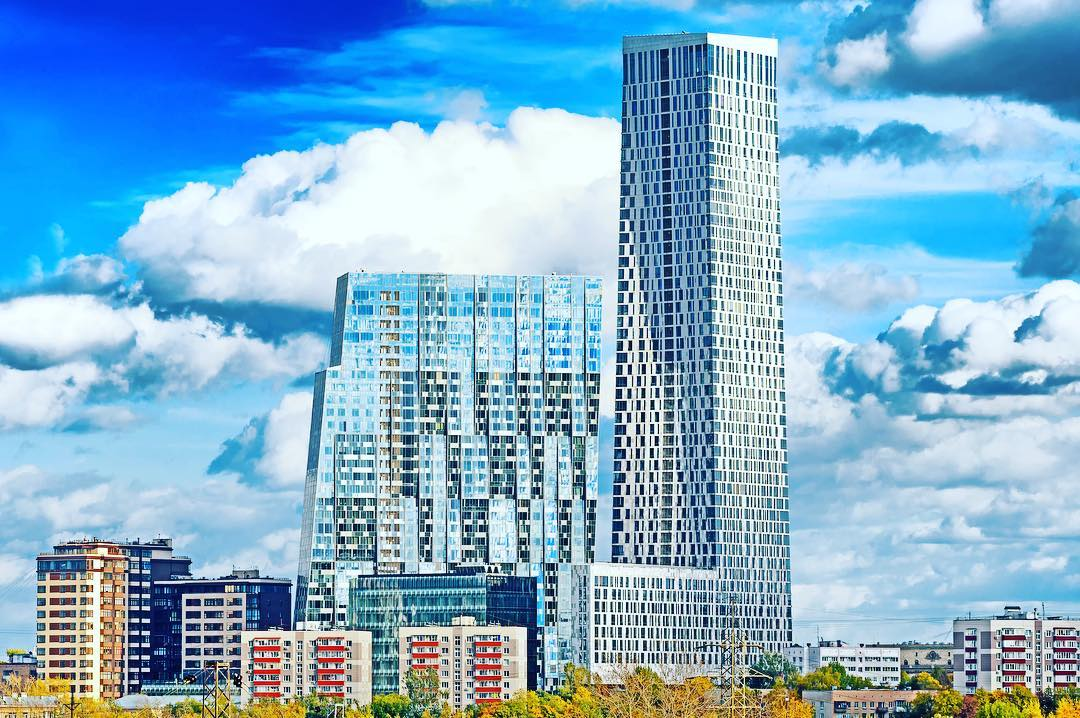
- Location in Moscow

General information
- Status: Completed
- Architectural style: Postmodern
- Location: Moscow, Russia
- Coordinates: 55°43′22″N 37°31′42″E
- Completed: 2011

Height
- Roof: 213 m (699 ft) (taller tower); 131 m (430 ft) (lower tower)

Technical details
- Floor count: 54 (taller tower); 34 (lower tower)

Design and construction
- Architect: Sergey Skuratov
- Architecture firm: Sergey Skuratov Architects
- Developer: DonStroy corp.

The House on Mosfilmovskaya (Russian: Дом на Мосфильмовской), or Mosfilm Tower, is a Russian skyscraper in the Mosfilmovskaya section of Moscow, Russia. This building, located on Mosfilmovskaya street, is a residential complex consisting of 2 towers: one of 213 meters (54 floors) and the other 131 meters (34 floors). The building was completed in December 2011.

== Architecture ==
The entire composition is situated on a three-level stylobate that includes underground parking, commercial and sports facilities, a well-designed roof with entrances for residential and office areas, sports grounds, and recreational spaces. The complex features distinct units for the trade center and offices. The connecting low-rise buildings and the main tower are elevated 17 meters, supported by seemingly chaotic, tilted columns made of coal-black cast-in-situ concrete. The multifunctional complex is characterized by the main tower, which stands 214 meters high, and a chip-like building that reaches 130 meters. These high-rise structures are linked by a third element consisting of two parallel 8-story units, creating an atrium between them with a well-lit interior space.

The apartments in this residential complex offer stunning panoramic views of Moscow, including the Lakes Golf Club, Forest Park, Moscow State University, the domes of the Novodevichy Convent, the embankments of the Moscow River, the fountains at Poklonnaya Hill, and the city center. The project was designed by Sergey Skuratov, an academician of the International Academy of Architecture.

The complex features two distinctively shaped towers connected by a low-rise section. The unique "glass" facades were created using system solutions from HUECK-HARTMAN and are based on the HUECK profile system. The entrance areas are elegantly finished with black marble and glass panels. The residential section boasts a grand gallery with a height of over 8 meters.

The complex is equipped with SIGMA (LG Elevators) elevator systems: 15 elevators serve the residential areas, 6 serve the offices, and 5 are installed in the shopping center. The underground portion includes a three-level parking garage with a car wash. The spacious courtyard features a children's playground. The entire area is fenced and secured for safety.

On 4 May 2026, House on Mosfilmovskaya was damaged by a Ukrainian drone.
