= Cosmos Hotel =

Hotel Cosmos
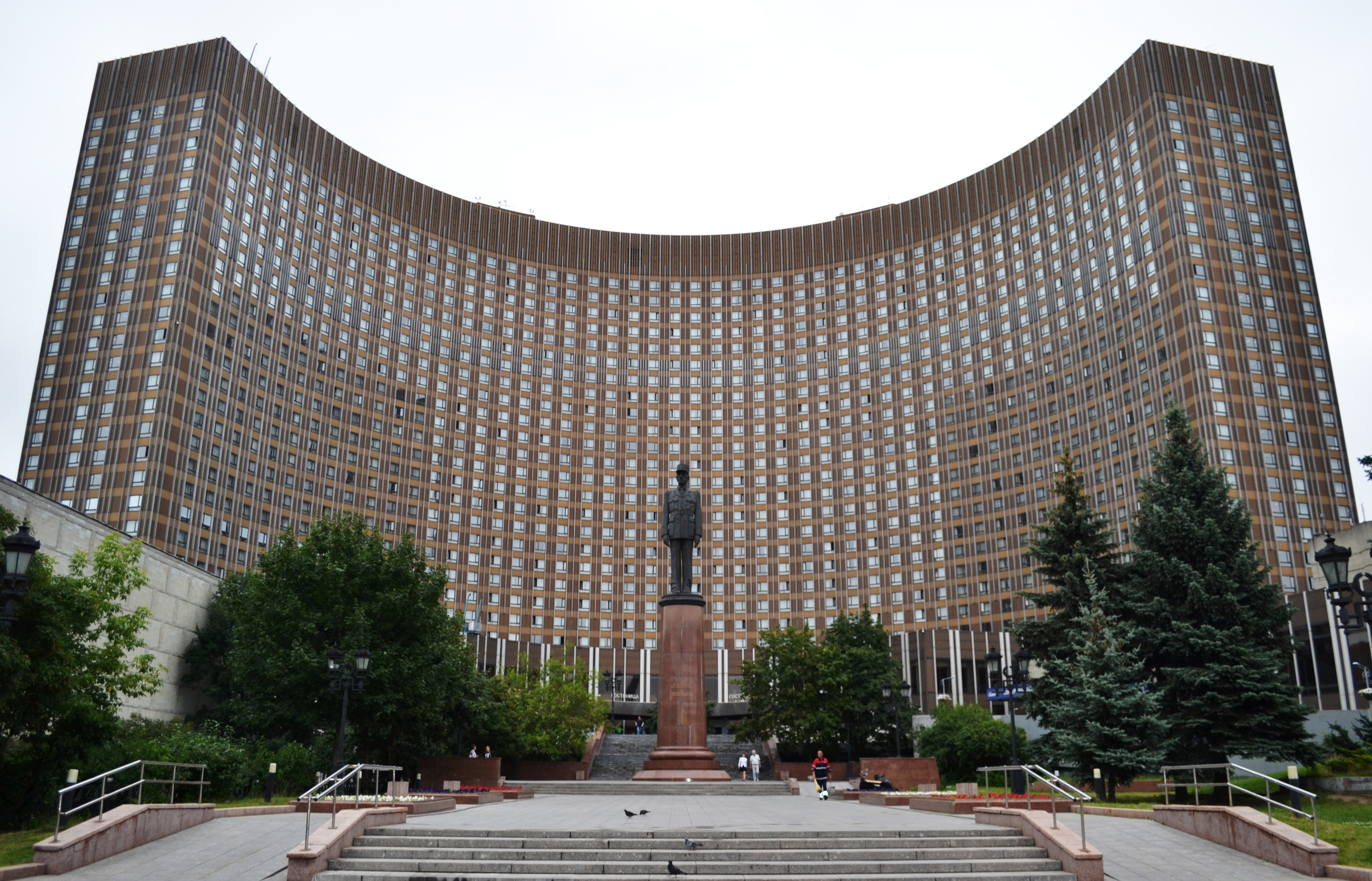

- Location within Moscow

General information
- Type: Hotel
- Location: Moscow, Russia, 129366, Moscow, Prospect Mira, 150, Moscow, Russia
- Coordinates: 55°49′20″N 37°38′50″E
- Completed: 1979
- Opened: 1979

Height
- Top floor: 25

Technical details
- Floor count: 25
- Floor area: 106,113 sq.m.

Website
- www.hotelcosmos.ru/eng/

The Cosmos Hotel is located in north-central Moscow in a green zone on Mira Avenue. It is located next to the VDNKh exhibition center, close to Ostankino Telecom Tower, the Olympic Stadium and the "Sokolniki" Exhibition Complex. It has the Charles de Gaulle Monument (Moscow).

== Overview ==
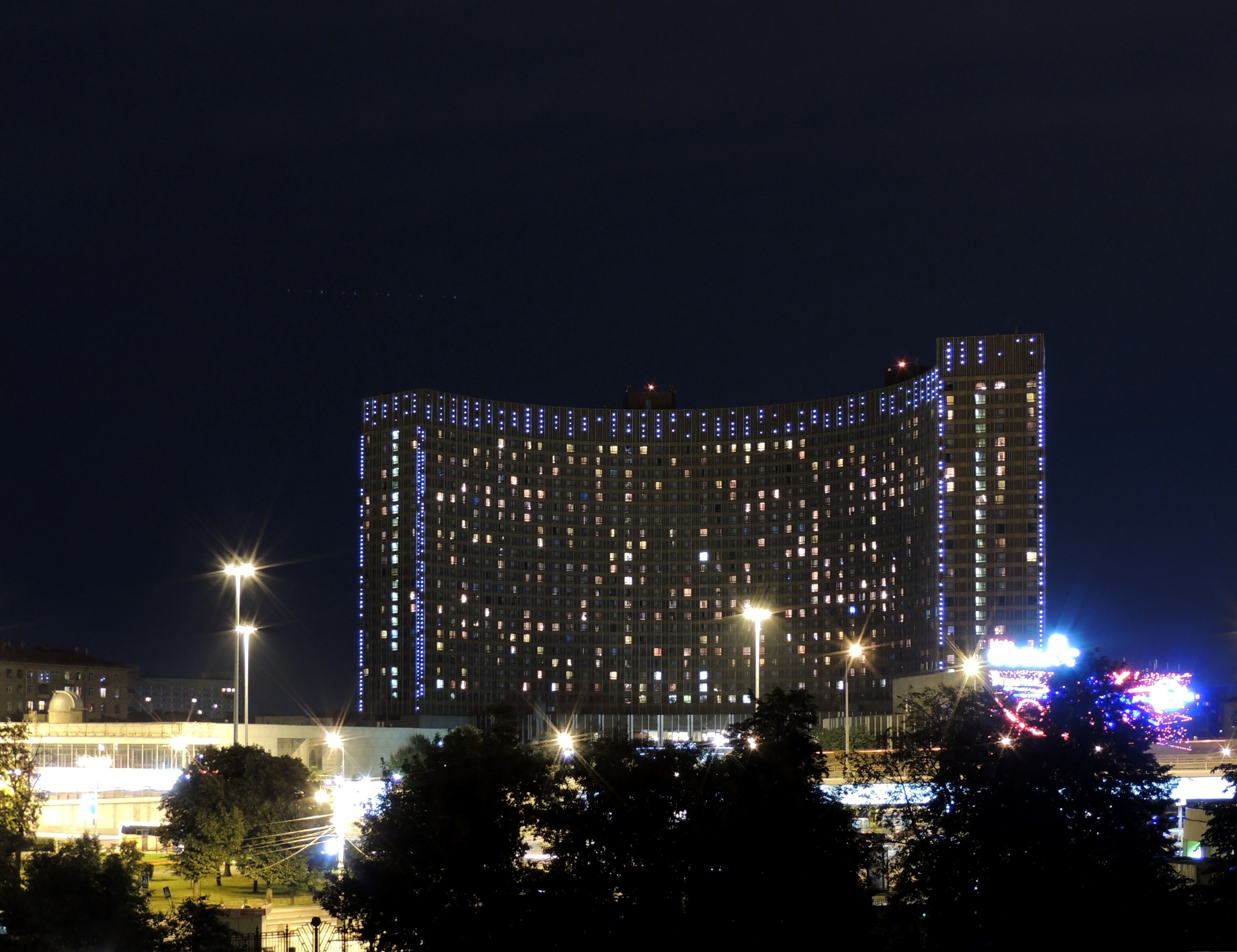
Hotel Cosmos at Night

The hotel complex was built to serve the 1980 Summer Olympics as the Olympic Family hotel. The building and the nearby monument "Conquerors of Space" were developed jointly by a team of Soviet and French architects: V. Andreev and T. Zaikin and B. Steiskal of Mosproekt 1; and O. Kakub, P. Jouglet, S. Epstein of France. Construction of buildings was a joint venture with French property company Sefri (today called Sefri Cime).

The hotel, with 1,777 rooms, is the largest hotel in Russia. Cosmos Hotel, which is owned by Sistema, is located at Prospect Mira, 150 in Moscow.

In 2024 the Cosmos Hotel Group took the 2nd place in the Forbes ranking of the largest hotel chains.

== History ==
The opening ceremony took place on 18 July 1979 and was attended by prominent politicians, businessmen, and stars of the Soviet system. Special guest singer Joe Dassin performed at the opening.

== In popular culture ==
The Cosmos Hotel was a location in the Russian movie Day Watch.

Footage of the Kosmos hotel was used in the BBC documentary Russia 1985–1999: TraumaZone by Adam Curtis. The running tap water was brown in colour.
