= Charles de Gaulle Monument (Moscow) =

Monument in Russia

Coordinates: 55.822533°N 37.646108°E

- Памятник Шарлю де Голлю
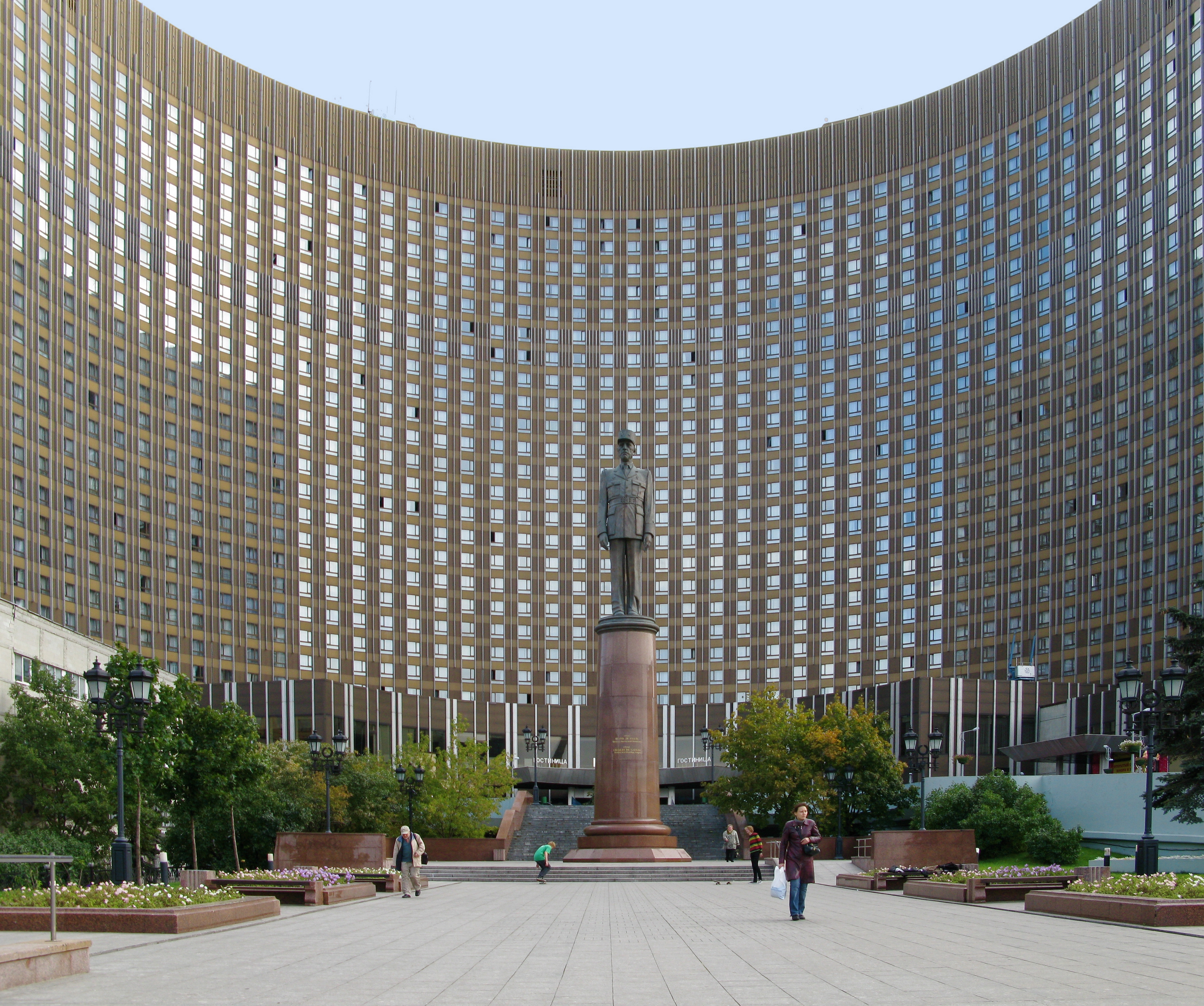
- Interactive map of Charles de Gaulle Monument
- Location: Moscow
- Builder: Zurab Tsereteli (architect)
- Type: Statue
- Material: Red granite (base), bronze (statue)
- Height: 18 metres (59 ft)
- Opening date: 9 May 2005

The Charles de Gaulle Monument (Russian: Памятник де Голлю) stands in front of the Cosmos Hotel on a square named after Charles de Gaulle in Moscow, Russia.

== Description ==
The monument consists of a ten-metre high (33 ft) red granite base, topped by an eight-metre high (26 ft) bronze statue of De Gaulle, the leader of Free France and President of France. Sculptor Zurab Tsereteli chose for the monument to be of such a height, due to the high building behind it.

Tsereteli, a close friend of mayor of Moscow Yuri Luzhkov, said that he depicted De Gaulle as he had personally seen him in 1968. He had been planning the monument since 2003.

== Inauguration ==
The monument was inaugurated on 9 May 2005 by French president Jacques Chirac and the President of Russia Vladimir Putin, on the 60th anniversary of Victory in Europe Day, the defeat of Nazi Germany. Chirac used his speech to praise the Treaty of Lisbon for which the French were about to have a referendum: "Tomorrow, the treaty will be, for each of the States and peoples of the Union, the base on which they will together build their roads to peace".

== Reception ==
French newspaper La Dépêche du Midi reported that the work was controversial for its author and its appearance, being locally nicknamed "The Nightmare". Magazine L'Obs wrote that "if the dimensions and the materials make you think of the large Asian, Turkmen or North Korean statues, its position [in front of the hotel] makes it not appear overwhelming". In Le Figaro, Irina de Chikoff found it to look like a scarecrow or robot, and reported that the local press had mocked it as resembling French comic actor Louis de Funès in one of his roles as a gendarme.
