= Monument to Marina Tsvetaeva =

- Памятник Марине Цветаевой
- Location: Moscow, Borisoglebsky Lane
- Coordinates: 55°45′15″N 37°35′22″E

The Monument to Marina Tsvetaeva (Russian: Памятник Марине Цветаевой) is a monument in Moscow in Borisoglebsky Lane opened in 2007. Authors of a monument — the sculptor N. A. Matveeva, architects S. P. Buritsky, A. S. Dubovsky. The monument belongs to the category "city sculpture".

== History ==
It was planned in the early 1990s to establish in Moscow a monument to the Russian poet Marina Tsvetaeva, celebrating the 100-year anniversary of the date of her birth. In 1992 a competition was held, and in 1993 it was declared that first place was won by the project of the sculptor Nina Matveeva. However there were problems with financing, and it was not possible to find sponsors. On the planned monument installation site, the building site was soon formed.

The monument was cast in bronze in 2007. Its installation was scheduled for the 115th anniversary of the poet's birth. The opening ceremony was held on 26 December 2007. Present were the first deputy mayor of the Government of Moscow Lyudmila Shvetsova, the Deputy Minister of Culture and Mass Communications of the Russian Federation Andrey Busygin, and the chairman of the Russian Writers' Union Valery Ganichev.

The monument is located near Marina Tsvetaeva's house museum. She lived in this house from about 1914 to 1922; then she emigrated with her family.

The coauthor of a monument to Marina Tsvetaeva in Tarusa, Boris Messerer, spoke of Matveeva's work: "It is very graceful, modest, and absolutely not similar to a monument. He is very noble and also creates a very architecturally complex chamber".
