= Monument to Nil Filatov =

- Памятник Нилу Филатову
- 55°44′00″N 37°34′26″E
- Location: Moscow, Maiden's Field
- Designer: G. I. Gavrilov; E. I. Kutyrev
- Material: Bronze, granite
- Completion date: 1960

The Monument to Nil Filatov (Russian: Памятник Нилу Филатову) was installed in 1960 in Moscow in the square of the Maiden Field. The authors of the monument are sculptor V. E. Tsigal and architects G. I. Gavrilov and E. I. Kutyrev. The monument has the status of an object of cultural heritage of federal significance.

== Description ==
Professor of Moscow University Nil Fyodorovich Filatov (1847–1902) is known as the founder of the Russian pediatric school. Therefore, it was decided to establish a monument to him in the square of the Maiden Field, near the Institute of Obstetrics and Gynecology. The grand opening of the monument took place on May 26, 1960.

On a pedestal made of even granite with a height of 2.5 m, a bronze sculpture with a height of 3.5 m is installed. Filatov is depicted at work, with all the attributes of his profession. He stands in full growth, and to the left, nestling to his hand, is a naked little boy. The doctor seemed to have just finished examining a sick child and thought deeply. His face is serious, calm, and a bit mournful. The view is directed towards the child, but, it seems, past him.

The location of the monument makes it impossible to inspect it from a long distance. Because of the surrounding trees, the viewer is always close enough, usually from the frontal part. This feature was taken into account by the sculptor. He tried to solve the problem of the best perception of the head and face of Filatov.

The general humanism of this monument also reflects the inscription on the pedestal: "To a friend of children, Nil Fedorovich Filatov. 1847–1902".
