= Monument to Joseph Brodsky =

- Памятник Иосифу Бродскому
- Interactive map of Monument to Joseph Brodsky
- Coordinates: 55°45′25″N 37°35′06″E
- Designer: Georgy Frangulyan, Sergey Skuratov
- Material: bronze, granite
- Beginning date: 2011
- Completion date: 2011

The Monument to Joseph Brodsky (Russian: Памятник Иосифу Бродскому) was installed in 2011 in Moscow on Novinsky Boulevard near the United States embassy building. The authors of the monument are the sculptor Georgy Frangulyan and the architect Sergey Skuratov.

== History and description ==
Sculptor Georgy Frangulyan worked on the monument to the poet Joseph Brodsky for several years. In 2008, the monument was cast in bronze, and in 2009 it was decided to install it in Moscow on Novinsky Boulevard. It took some time to make room for the monument, because there was a currency exchange office. Sculptor Georgy Frangulyan installed the monument on its own funds. "The monument to Brodsky is my personal gift to the city. Everything is complete: a pedestal, a granite, and a sculpture," - said the sculptor. May 31, 2011 the solemn opening of the monument took place. The ceremony was attended by state and public figures, famous artists and writers.

The monument to Joseph Brodsky was not accidentally installed near the American embassy. Joseph Brodsky was persecuted in the USSR and was forced to emigrate to the United States. The monument is a multi-figure composition, mounted on a granite pedestal. 13 faceless, schematically depicted bronze figures are united into two groups, symbolizing envious persons and friends. Before them is the relief figure of Brodsky. He will turn to the American embassy. The head of the poet is thrown back up, his hands are thrust into the pockets of his pants. He wears a foreign costume and sharp-pointed Italian shoes.
