= Lenin Monument in the Kaluga Square =

Statue in Moscow

Monument to Lenin on Kaluga Square
- Памятник Ленину на Калужской площади
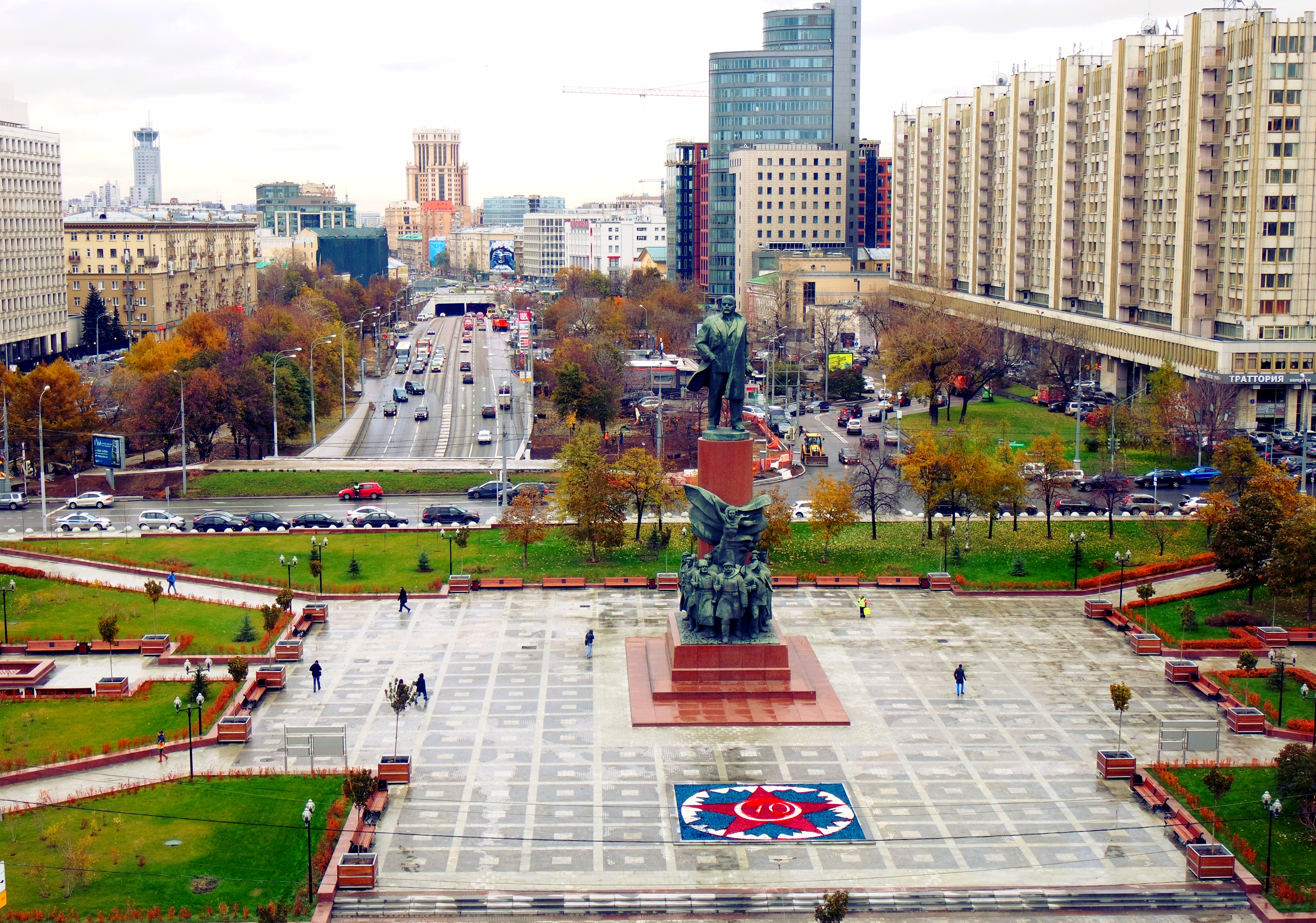
- 55.729466°N 37.613176°E
- Location: Moscow, Kaluga Square
- Designer: G. V. Makarevich; B. A. Samsonov
- Completion date: 1985
- Opening date: 1985

The Monument to Lenin on Kaluga Square (Russian: Памятник Ленину на Калужской площади) was established in 1985 in Moscow in the center of Kaluga Square (then October). The authors of the monument are the sculptors L. E. Kerbel, V. A. Fedorov, the architects G. V. Makarevich, B. A. Samsonov. It is the largest monument to Lenin in Moscow.

== History and description ==
The bronze sculpture of V. I. Lenin was made at the Leningrad factory "Monument sculpture". It is an original copy of the monument to Lenin in Birobidzhan, established in 1978. A stone monolithic pedestal column weighing 360 tons after the initial treatment was delivered in place by a cart that had 128 wheels. The monument was inaugurated on 5 November 1985 by the General Secretary of the CPSU Central Committee, Mikhail Gorbachev.

The height of the monument is 22 m. At the top of the cylindrical column of red polished granite is a bronze statue of V. I. Lenin in full growth. His figure is directed forward, his gaze is turned to the distance. Lenin's coat is unbuttoned, one floor is thrown back by the wind, the right hand is in the jacket's jacket.

At the base of the pedestal is a multi-figure composition, which includes revolutionary soldiers, workers and sailors of various nationalities. Above them is a woman on the background of a fluttering flag embodying the Revolution. Behind the pedestal is the figure of a woman with two children, personifying the rear of the revolution. The elder boy in his hand has revolutionary newspapers.
