= President Ho Chi Minh's Testament =

Publication by Hô Chí Minh

- Author: Hồ Chí Minh
- Published: 1969
- Published in English: 1969

The President Ho Chi Minh's Testament is a political document written by Vietnamese revolutionary and President Hồ Chí Minh. In his thousand word testament, Ho Chi Minh extols his countrymen to continue the fight for independence, and communist revolution in a unified Vietnam. The testament also provides instructions for the Communist Party of Vietnam to lead the Vietnamese people towards socialism and national liberation. The continues testament is the subject of wide discussion and study in Vietnam, and was central to the development of Ho Chi Minh Thought.

In 1965, due to his deteriorating health, Hồ Chí Minh began to write his last testament. The testament underwent multiple drafts and was finally published in 1969.
