= Monument to Fyodor Tolbukhin =

- Памятник Фёдору Толбухину
- Interactive map of Monument to Fyodor Tolbukhin
- Location: Moscow, Samotychnaya Street
- Coordinates: 55°46′41″N 37°37′10″E
- Designer: G. A. Zakharov
- Material: bronze, labradorite
- Completion date: 1960

The Monument to Fyodor Tolbukhin (Russian: Памятник Маршалу Советского Союза Фёдору Ивановичу Толбухину) was installed in 1960 in Moscow in the square on Samotychnaya Street. The authors of the monument are the sculptor L. E. Kerbel and the architect G. A. Zakharov. The monument has the status of an object of cultural heritage of federal significance.

== History and description ==
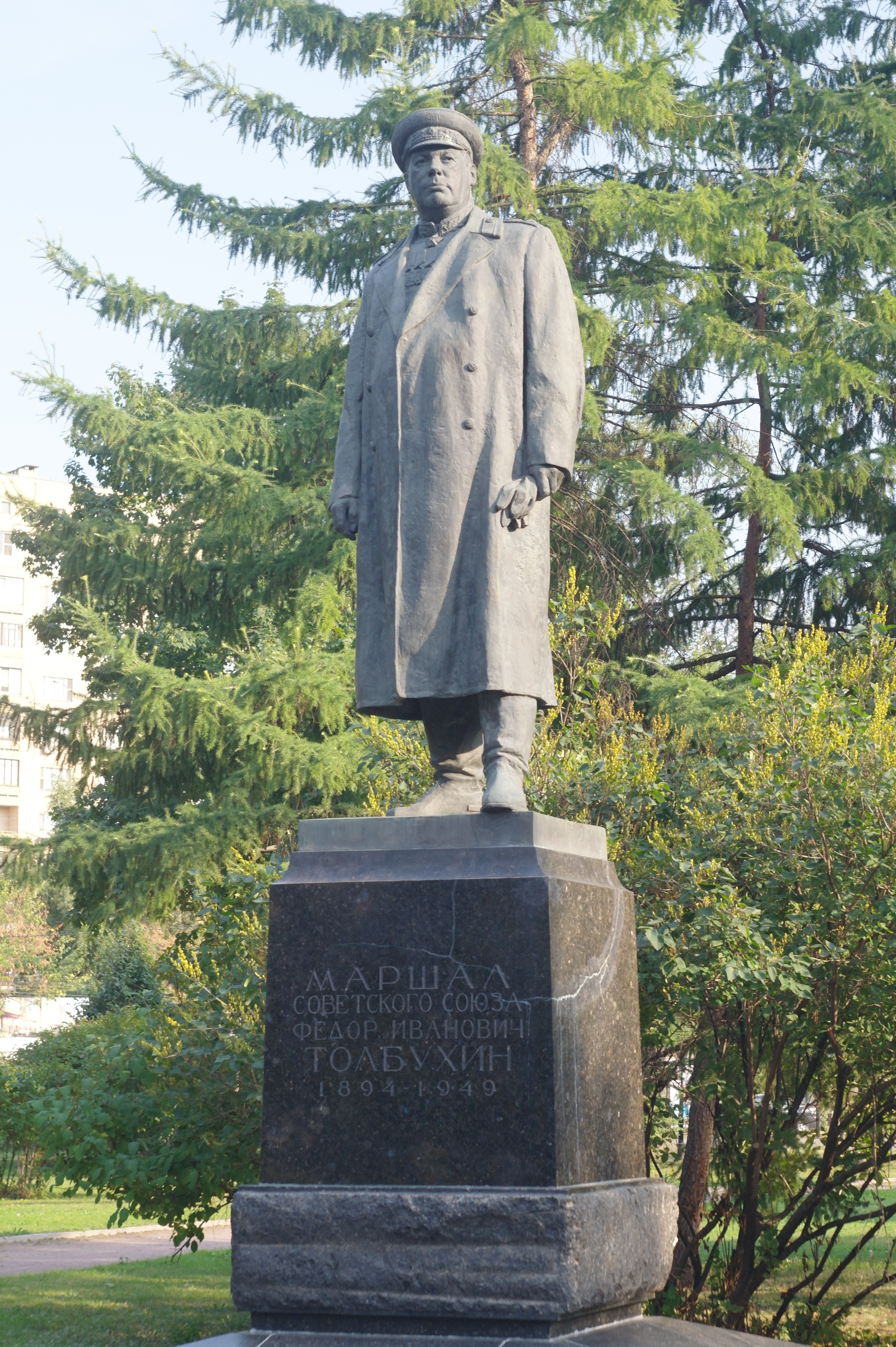
Marshal Tolbukhin Monument

In 1949, the sculptor Lev Kerbel produced the bust of Marshal F. I. Tolbukhin, and a year later began work on the draft of the monument. By 1960 the monument was ready.

On 14 May 1960, the monument was inaugurated in the square in Samotychnaya Street. Representatives of workers, party, public organizations of the city, military units of the Moscow garrison were present.

A three-meter bronze sculpture is mounted on a pedestal of black labradorite. Marshal F. I. Tolbukhin was photographed in full order, in a greatcoat. His gaze is fixed to the distance, his left leg is slightly pushed forward. Hands are half-empty, in the left hand – removed gloves. The sculptor conveyed the confidence and determination of the commander, a combination of personal courage and the art of commanding the troops. The sculpture is best perceived in the front and three-quarters on the left.

The monument's pedestal, designed by architect G. A. Zakharov, is a cube of polished dark gray granite. This cube in the lower part turns into a coarse chipped block, mounted on a square socle with a ramp. The words "Marshal of the Soviet Union. Fedor Ivanovich Tolbukhin. 1894–1949".
