= Monument to Leo Tolstoy on Prechistenka =

Sculpture in Moscow

Coordinates: 55°44′33″N 37°35′49″E

Monument to Leo Tolstoy
- Памятник Льву Толстому
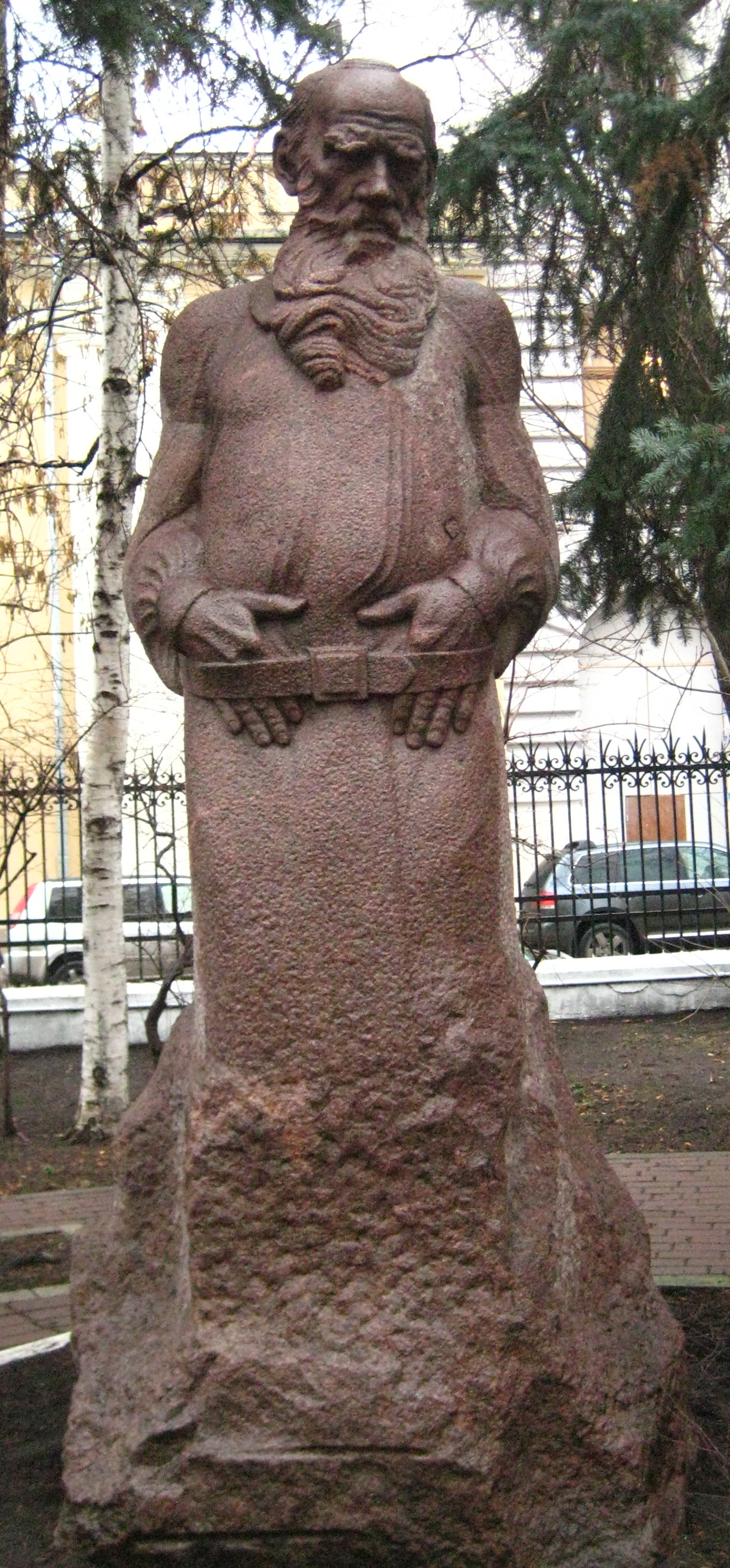
- Interactive map of Monument to Leo Tolstoy
- Location: Moscow, Prechistenka Street, 11
- Designer: Sergey Merkurov
- Completion date: 1913

The Monument to Leo Tolstoy on Prechistenka (Russian: Памятник Льву Толстому на Пречистенке) was installed in Moscow in the courtyard of the State Museum of Leo Tolstoy (11, Prechistenka Street). The granite sculpture was made in 1913 by sculptor Sergey Merkurov, and has been in its current location since 1972.

== History ==
Sculptor Sergey Merkurov made a death mask of Leo Tolstoy in November 1910. He used this create a monument to the writer, commissioned by his Moscow patron N. A. Shakhov. In 1913, a sculpture carved from Finnish granite was ready. The original plan was to place the monument on Miusskaya Square, opposite the Shanyavsky Moscow City People's University. However, this would have placed the monument in front of the Alexander Nevsky Cathedral that was then under construction. This was controversial, as Tolstoy had been excommunicated from the Russian Orthodox Church. The Black Hundred organization "Union of the Russian People" threatened to blow up the monument. As a result, the Moscow City Duma refused permission for the installation of the monument, and the sculpture remained in Merkurov's studio.

The sculpture was recalled during the years of Soviet power, and in 1928 the monument was erected in the Maiden Field Square, part of the Leninist plan for monumental propaganda. In 1972, it was replaced by a larger monument to Tolstoy, by the sculptor A. M. Portyanko. Merkurov's monument was moved to its present location, outside of the State Museum of Leo Tolstoy.

In addition to these two monuments, a third monument in Moscow to Tolstoy is located in front of the so-called "House of Rostov" on Povarskaya Street.

== Description ==
The monument is quite generalized in its forms, which is typical of the pre-revolutionary works of Merkurov. The figure of the writer seems to grow out of a piece of red coarse granite. His head is slightly tilted. The writer is dressed in a wide blouse, his hands are plugged in the waistband.
