= Alley of the rulers of Russia =

Coordinates: 55.7565°N 37.6365°E

- Location: Moscow, Russia
- Built: 2017
- Architect: Zurab Tsereteli

Alley of the rulers of Russia is a sculptural composition located in Moscow, Russia. It consists of a set of identical stelae on which busts of all the rulers of Russia are installed, starting with Prince Rurik. The space where the busts are located is a small square, inside the territory at the address - Petroverigsky Lane, house 4, a square near the Turgenev - Botkin estate.

The opening of the alley took place on May 26, 2017. The ceremony was attended by Minister of Culture of the Russian Federation Vladimir Medinsky and Minister of Education Olga Vasilyeva. The busts of the Soviet leaders were opened on September 22, 2017, and the bust of the first President of the Russian Federation Boris Yeltsin was opened on April 23, 2018.

The sculptor who made all the busts is Zurab Tsereteli.

== List of rulers represented on the alley ==
1. Rurik
2. Oleg the Seer
3. Olga of Kiev
4. Sviatoslav I
5. Vladimir the Great
6. Yaroslav the Wise
7. Vladimir Monomakh
8. Yuri the Long Hands
9. Andrey the Pious
10. Vsevolod the Big Nest
11. Alexander Nevsky
12. Ivan I Kalita
13. Dmitry of the Don
14. Vasily II the Blind
15. Ivan III the Great
16. Vasili III
17. Ivan IV the Terrible
18. Feodor I
19. Boris Godunov
20. Michael Romanov
21. Alexis I
22. Sophia Alekseyevna
23. Peter I the Great
24. Anna Ioannovna
25. Elizabeth Petrovna
26. Peter III
27. Catherine II the Great
28. Paul I
29. Alexander I
30. Nicholas I
31. Alexander II
32. Alexander III
33. Nicholas II
34. Georgy Lvov
35. Alexander Kerensky
36. Vladimir Lenin
37. Joseph Stalin
38. Nikita Khrushchev
39. Leonid Brezhnev
40. Yuri Andropov
41. Konstantin Chernenko
42. Mikhail Gorbachev
43. Boris Yeltsin
