= Lenin Monument, Pavlovskaya Street =

Monument in Moscow

Monument to Lenin
- Памятник Ленину
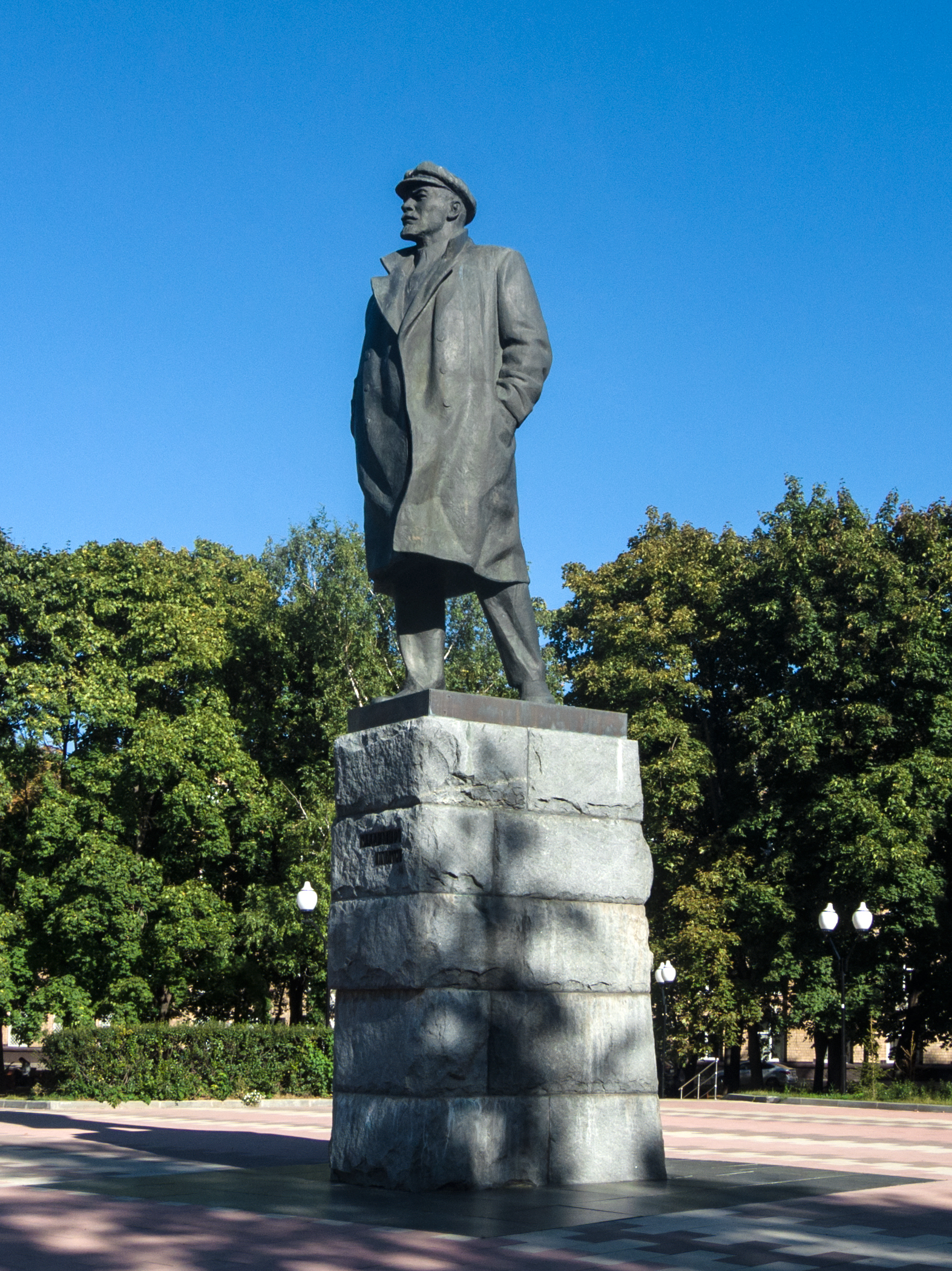
- Interactive map of Monument to Lenin
- Location: Moscow, Pavlovskaya street
- Designer: K. T. Topuridze
- Completion date: 1967

The Lenin Monument on Pavlovskaya Street (Russian: Памятник Ленину на Павловской улице) was installed in 1967 in Moscow in the park on Pavlovskaya Street in front of the Moscow Electromechanical Plant named after Vladimir Ilyich Lenin. Not far from this place, on August 30, 1918, an attempt was made on his life. The sculptor of the monument was V.B. Topuridze and the architect K.T. Topuridze. The monument has the status of an object of cultural heritage of federal significance.

== History ==
Lenin repeatedly visited the Mikhelson plant, where he spoke before the workers. Here, on August 30, 1918, an attempt was made on him, as a result of which he was seriously wounded.

In 1922, on the site of this attempt, plant workers installed a memorial stone of red polished granite. On the front side are inscribed the words: "The first stone of the monument on the site of an attempt on the life of the leader of the world proletariat, Vladimir Lenin. August 30, 1918 – November 1, 1922". The inscription on the reverse side reads: "Let the oppressed of the whole world know that at this point the bullet of the capitalist counterrevolution tried to interrupt the life and work of the leader of the world proletariat, Vladimir Ilich Lenin".

November 7, 1947 in the square in front of the plant near the monument a monument was erected a granite monument to V. I. Lenin sculptor S. D. Merkurov and architect A. Zhukov. In 1960, to the 90th anniversary of the birth of Lenin, the square around the monument was significantly expanded. In 1967, a monument to the work of SD Merkurov was moved to the territory of the plant, and in its place the present monument to the sculptor V. B. Topuridze and architect KT Topuridze was installed.

The present monument to Lenin on Pavlovskaya Street was established on the initiative of the old Bolsheviks of the plant named after Vladimir Ilyich. The sculptor and architect worked on the monument directly in one of the workshops of the plant, where they were consulted by veterans who personally attended Lenin's speeches. Workers of the plant named after Vladimir Ilyich made all forms for sculpture, which were then sent to the Leningrad plant "Monument Sculpture" for bronze casting.

The monument to Lenin was inaugurated on November 1, 1967, on the eve of the 50th anniversary of the October Revolution. Five-meter bronze sculpture is installed on a high granite pedestal. Lenin is depicted in full in a coat and cap.
