= Georgy Frangulyan =

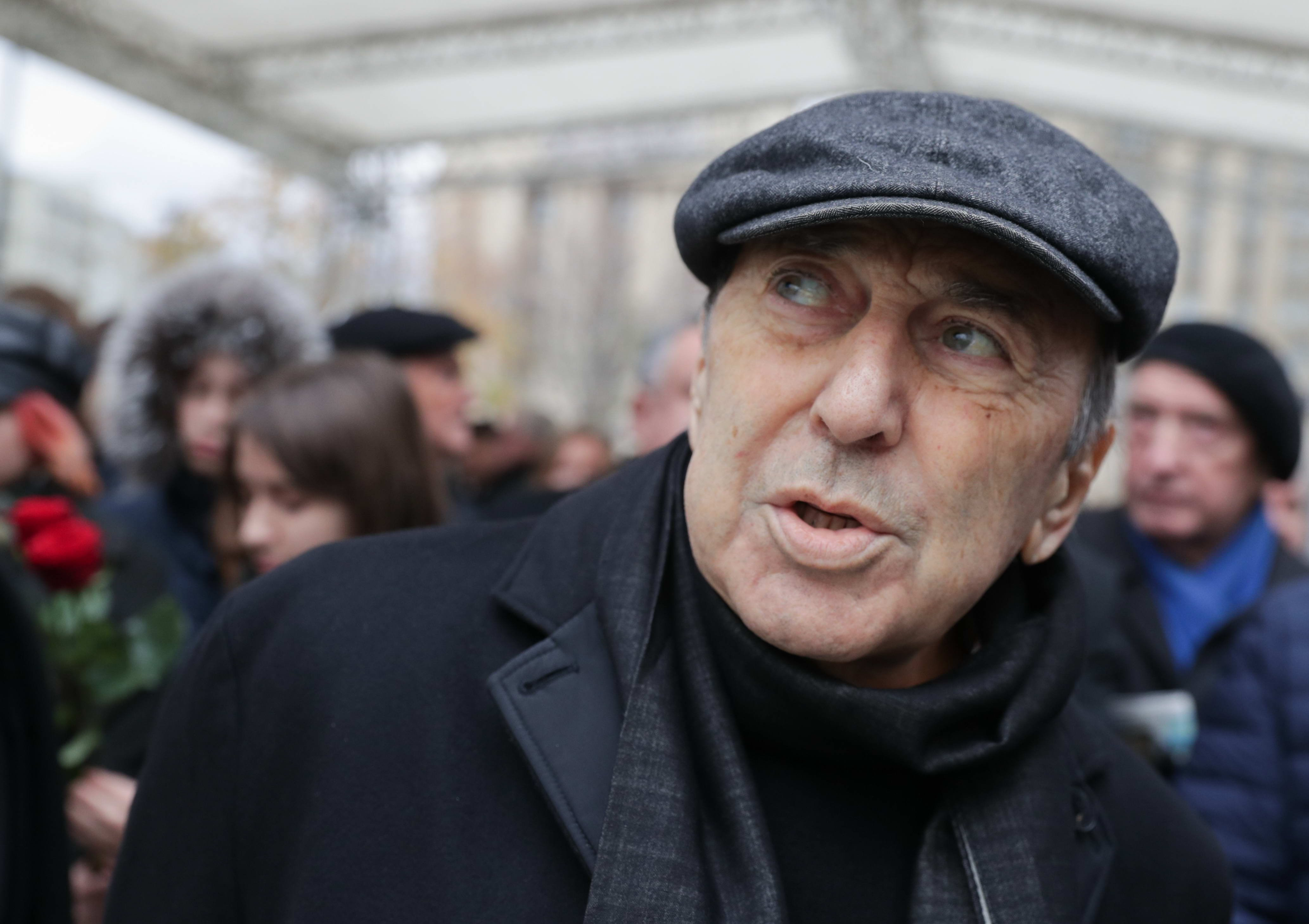
Frangulyan, 2019

Georgy Vartanovich Frangulyan (Russian: Георгий Вартанович Франгулян, Armenian: Գեորգի Վարդանի Ֆրանգուլյան; Born May 29, 1945) is a Soviet and Russian sculptor of Armenian descent. He is a member of the Russian Academy of Arts, People's Artist of the Russian Federation, and recipient of multiple awards and decorations.

== Notable works ==
- Monument to Joseph Brodsky
- Monument to Boris Yeltsin in Yekaterinburg
- Isaac Babel memorial, Odesa
- Wall of Grief
- Monument to Aram Khachaturian, Moscow
- Equestrian statue of Empress Elizabeth of Russia, Baltiysk
- Monument to Karo Halabyan (Moscow)
- Monument to Alexander Pushkin (Brussels)
