= Elektrichka =

Eastern Bloc suburban electrical multiple unit passenger train

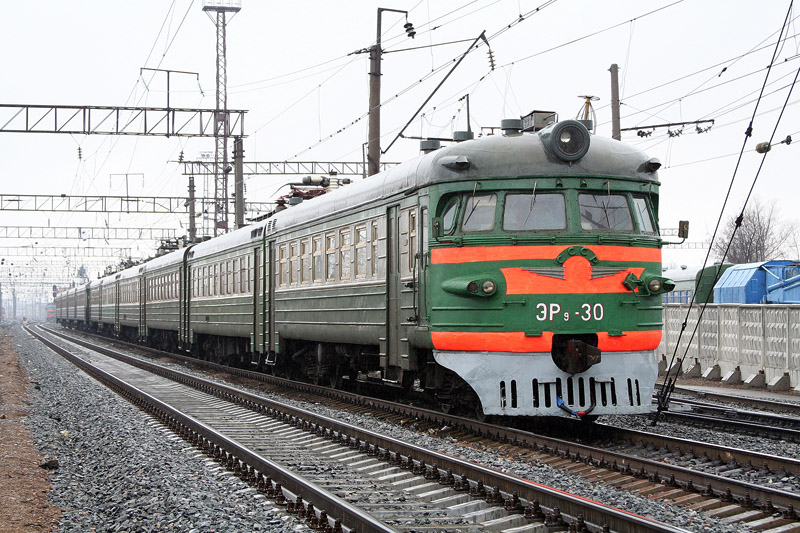
ER9 elektrichka in Murom

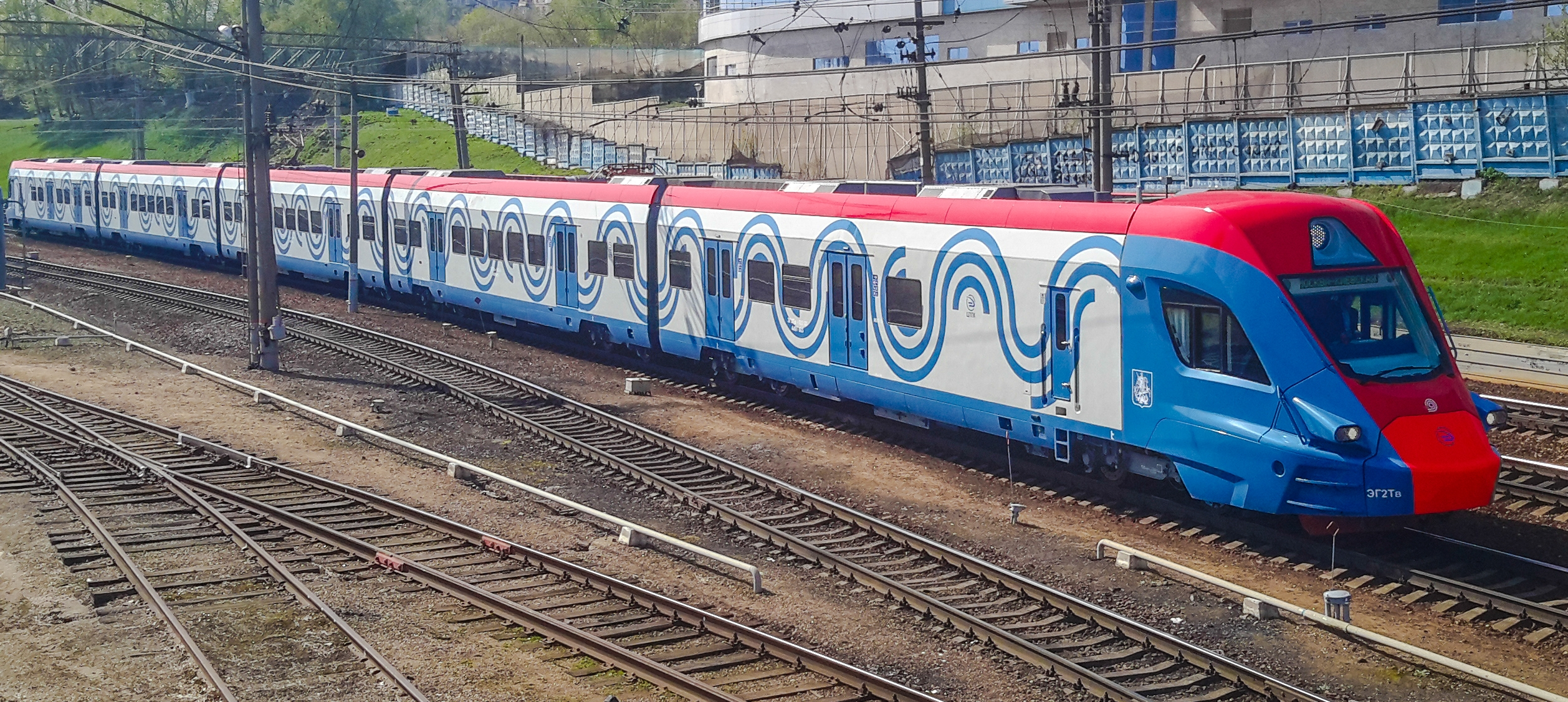
"Ivolga" (EG2T) on Moscow Central Diameters

An elektrichka (Russian: электричка [əlʲɪkˈtrʲitɕkə]; Ukrainian: електричка, romanized: elektrychka, IPA: [elekˈtrɪtʃkɐ]) is a Soviet and Eastern bloc commuter (regional) mostly suburban electrical multiple unit passenger train. Elektrichkas are widespread in Russia, Ukraine and other countries of the former Warsaw Pact presenting a socially vital mode of transportation. In 2007, 4085 commuter trains a day (in each direction) were running on the Russian Railways network alone, most of them electric. The first elektrichka train started running on July 6, 1926, along the Baku–Sabunchi line in Soviet Azerbaijan. Also urban (intra-city) gorodskaya elektrichkas and airport's aeroexpresses exist in a few cities of Russia, Ukraine, and Belarus.

== Name ==
"Elektrichka" was initially a colloquial abbreviation for elektropoyezd (Russian: электропоезд, IPA: [ɪˌlʲektrɐˈpojɪst], lit. 'electric train'), the official term for electrical multiple unit passenger train in respective languages. However, it is gradually becoming a part of the official trademark names. For instance, the intra-city train service in Kyiv is officially called "elektrychka" in Ukrainian. The popular Internet search engine Yandex officially uses Russian "elektrichka" in its branded online schedule services.

Since the collapse of the Soviet Union, the term "Elektrichka" is not in use with non-Russian speaking population in some countries where native Slavic language speakers are not in the majority.

== Rolling stock ==
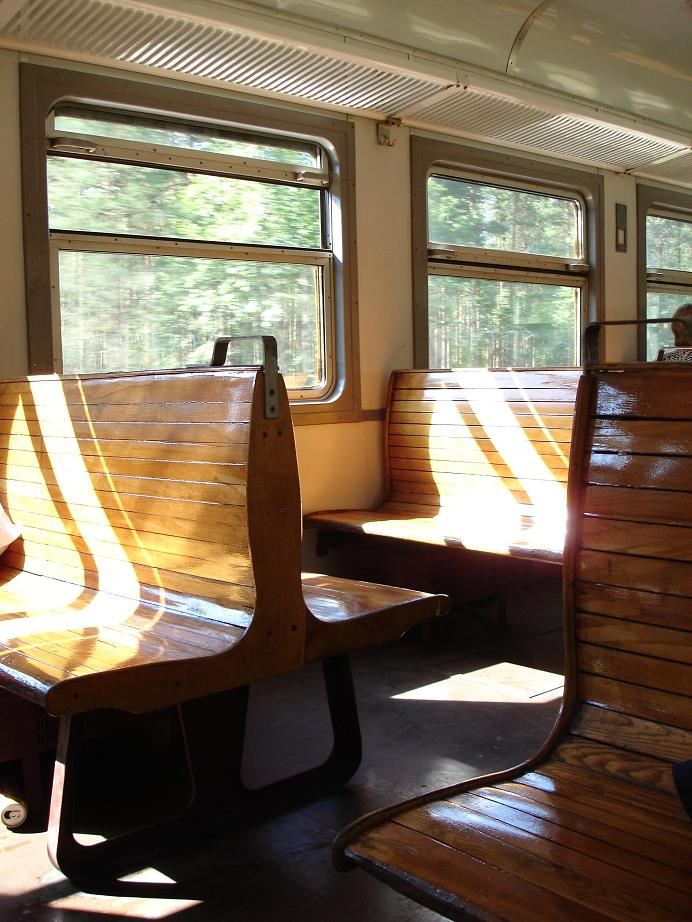
Interior of old EMU, with wooden seats

All elektrichkas are overhead line-fed electrical multiple unit (EMU) trains, usually consisting of 4 to 14 cars with a driver's cab at both ends. A 10-car train has a capacity of 1,200 passengers. The Soviet trains were manufactured at the Riga Wagon Plant in the Latvian Soviet Socialist Republic, and bore the "ER" (elektropoezd rizhskiy; Cyrillic: ЭР, электропоезд рижский) model designation. The plant was the only manufacturer from the 1950s until the break-up of the Soviet Union. The most widespread elektrichka models are the ER-2 (Russian: ЭР-2) and ER-9 (Russian: ЭР-9) (using DC and AC traction respectively); later models in use are mostly their variants and successors.

ER-2 and ER-9 trains contain an even number of cars; of each adjacent pair, one is equipped with motors and the other carries pneumatic equipment. Cars with cabs carry pneumatic equipment, and motor cars are easily recognizable because of pantographs on their roofs. Not every car is equipped with toilets; on some trains there are as few as two per train, near the driver's cab. Each car has four automatic doors, two on each side. When the train stops, doors on the platform side open simultaneously. Doors may be equipped with stairs, to allow for low station platforms. The doors are narrower than in metro trains. An elektrichka is bare-bones transportation with simple benches (each seating three) next to the windows.

With the dissolution of the Soviet Union some successor nations started production of new elektrichka models with limited success. Due to underfunding during the 1990s, railways continue to use Soviet-built trains, preferring renovation over replacement. Consequently, most elektrichkas in use are similar in appearance, differing only in livery; the Soviet-era standard was dark green, with red stripes on the front and a yellow stripe on the side of the train. Some newer models have wider doors or other electric engines, for example ED4 and EP2D series, cars are 1.5 windows longer and have wider doors, or ET4A with asynchronous motors.

== Non-elektrichka regional trains ==
The dizelnyi poezd (Russian: дизельный поезд, "diesel train"; colloquially, dizel Russian: дизель or motovoz, Russian: мотовоз) is a Soviet-type commuter train operationally similar to elektrichka. It is a diesel multiple unit train of up to six cars. A lot of routes have been served by "classic" trains of a single passenger car or several passenger cars hauled by a mainline diesel, mainline electric or even shunting diesel locomotive. However, such trains are less widespread since the majority of track on Soviet railroads has been electrified and (/or, if already electrified earlier) adapted (new platforms have been built) for elektrichka's, electricity in the region is cheap, and electric multiple-unit operation is far more effective for suburban traffic because of faster acceleration than diesel-hauled services. Non-elektrichkas also have significantly less socioeconomic importance because of the much lower average speed. The difference deepens as diesel locomotive-hauled commuter trains are being gradually replaced by more efficient railcars (relsovyi avtobus (Russian: рельсовый автобус, "railbuses") capable of moving far fewer passengers.

== Typical service organization ==
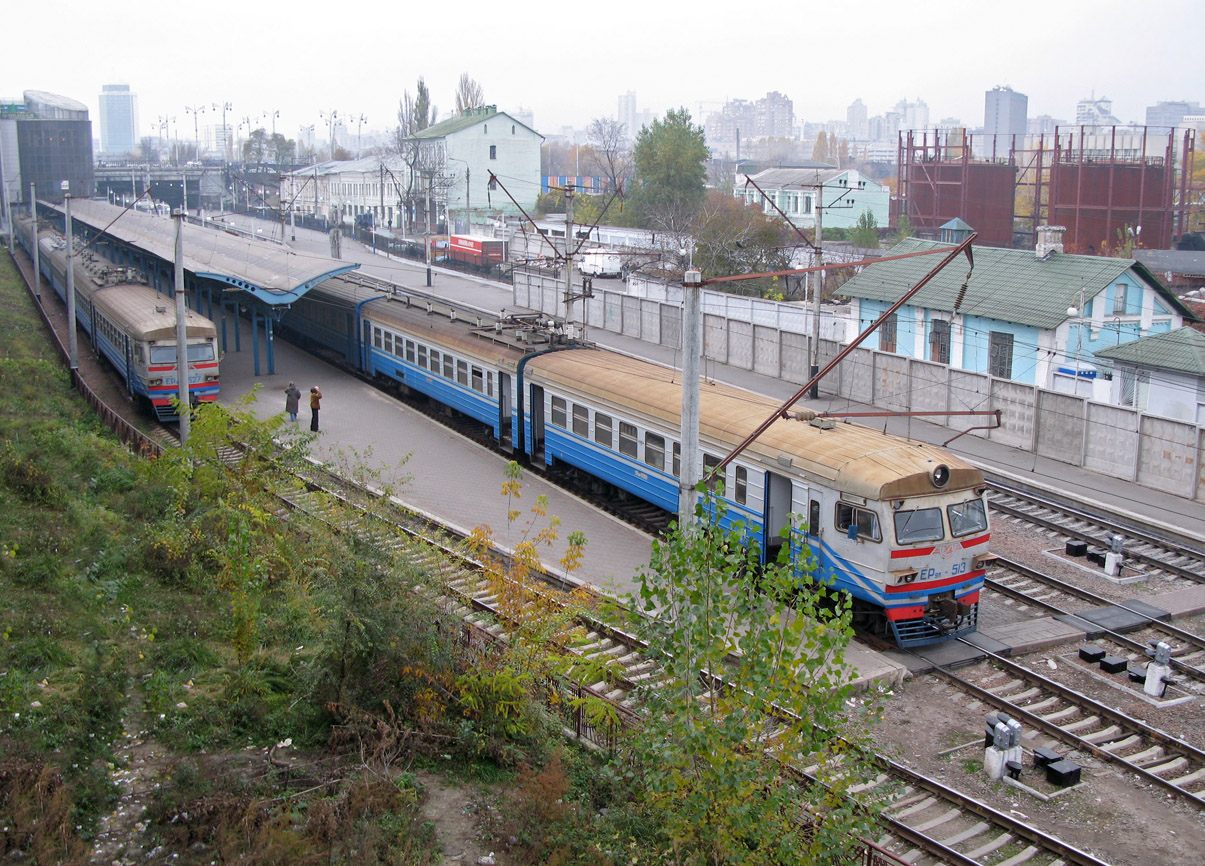
Elektrichkas on suburban platforms in Kyiv.

The elektrichka's crew consists of a driver and an assistant driver. Since distances between stations are usually long, elektrichkas also stop at specially built stops known as "platforms" (Russian: платформа). Sometimes these stops consist of nothing more than a simple platform, shorter than the length of the train and located in isolated areas. Some platforms lack permanent personnel or lighting. In some areas, elektrichkas stop at seasonal stops without a structure (in forest areas these are colloquially known as "mushroom stops", because they are extensively used by mushroom gatherers).

Elektrichkas are maintained in special depots (Russian: моторвагонное депо, motorvagonnoye depo, Ukrainian: моторвагонне депо, motorvahonne depo), where trains are repaired and train crews employed. However, neither elektrichkas nor their crews return to a depot every day; instead, they are assigned to the end stations of the routes.

== Regional details ==
=== Russia ===
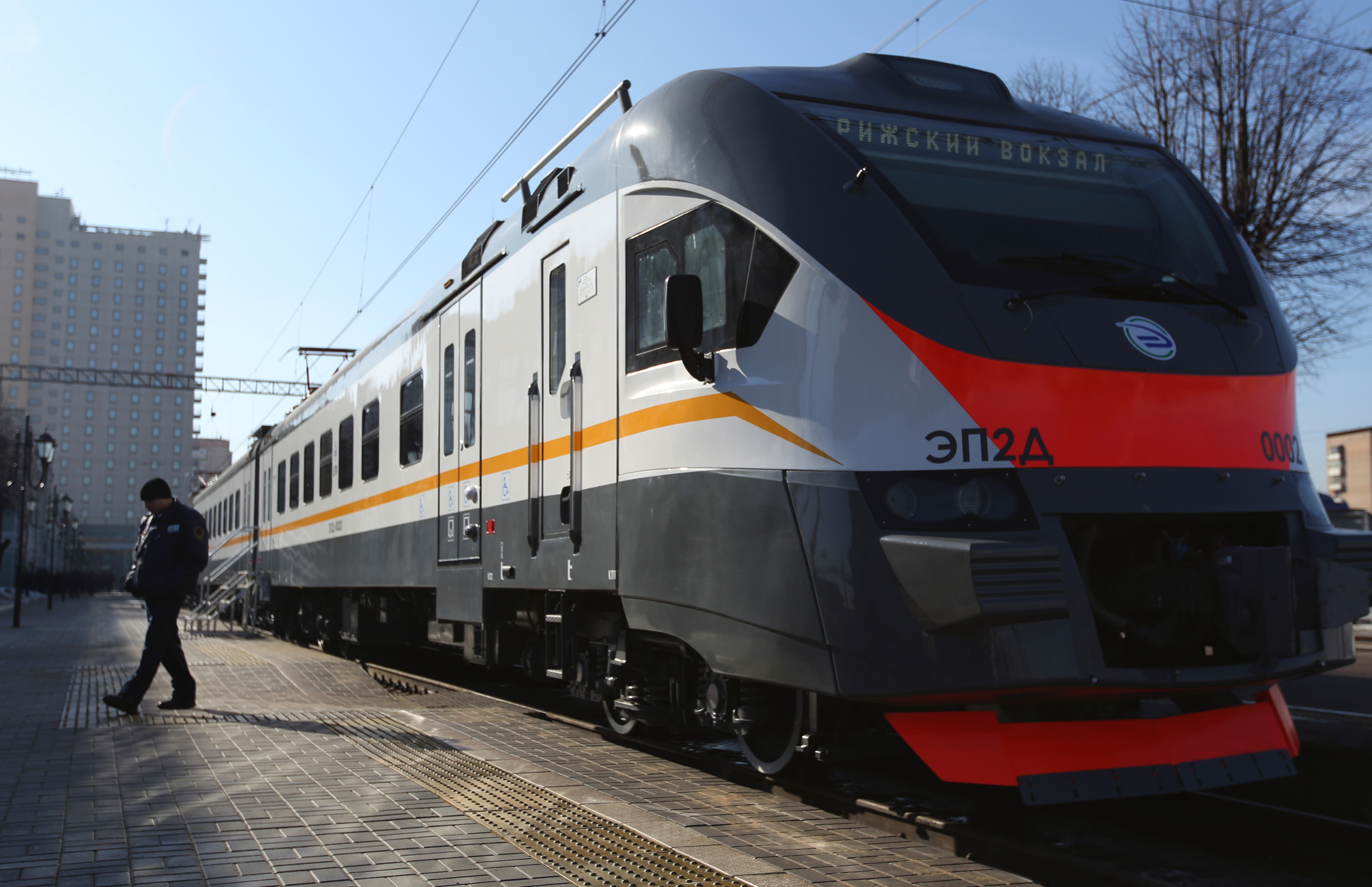
New EP2D elektrichka on Rizhsky rail terminal

Elektrichkas for Russian Railways are manufactured in Demikhovo, Moscow Oblast, Torzhok, Tver Oblast and Verkhnyaya Pyshma, Sverdlovsk Oblast. The trains link almost all cities which have a railroad with its outskirts and with its surrounding cities. Much of the countryside which they pass through is scenic. The elektrichka is an indispensable mode of transportation in Russia.

=== Ukraine ===
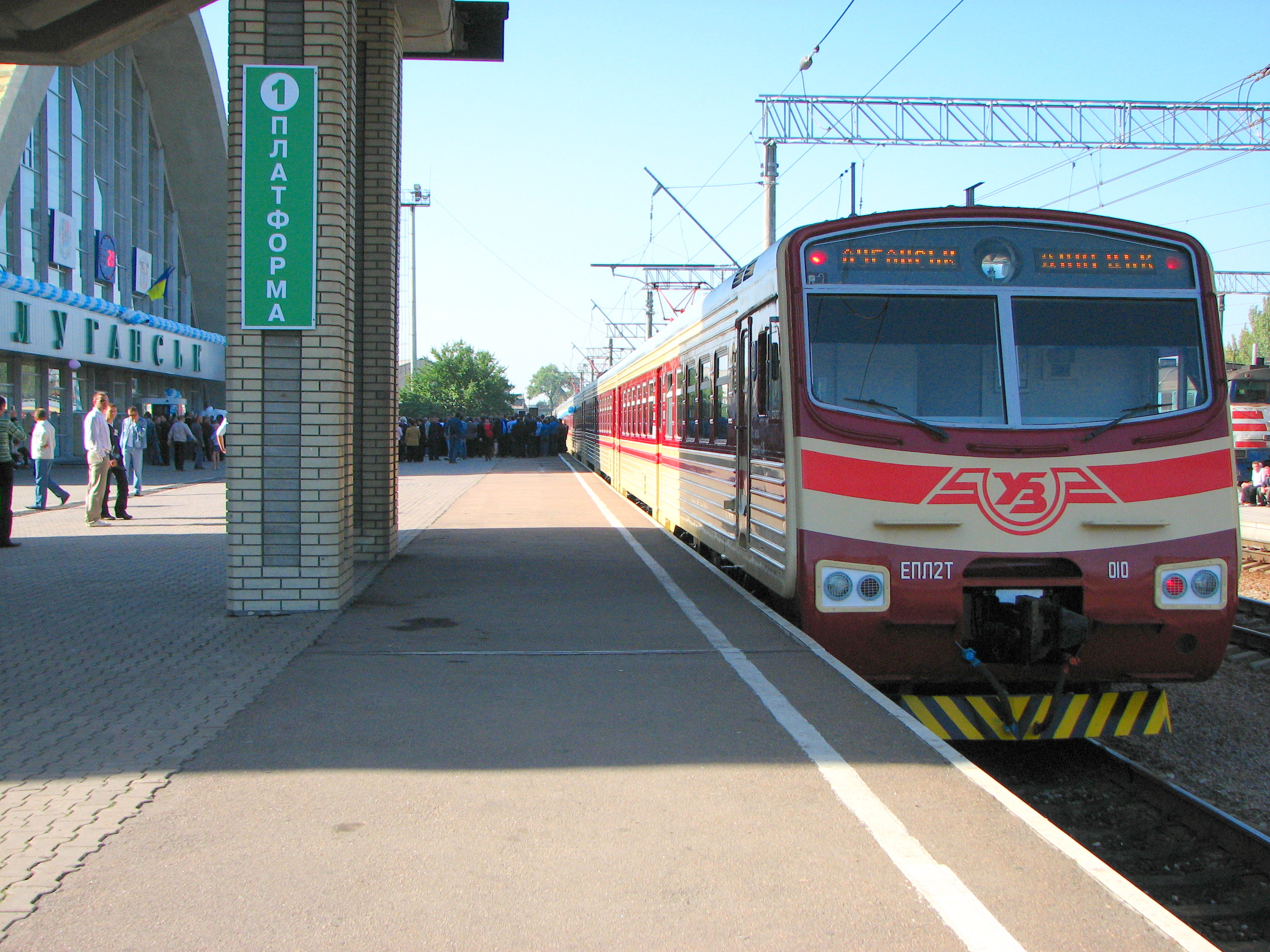
EPL2T-010 (Luhansk-Donetsk) elektrychka at Luhansk station

Ukraine, possessing a dense network of electrified railways, is supporting and developing its elektrychka system, officially known as elektropoyizd in Ukrainian. As of May 2010, there is no region of the country not covered by elektrychka service except the Ivano-Frankivsk and Chernivtsi oblasts (which do not have electrified railways and use diesel trains). A typical elektrychka route is around 100 km (62 mi) in length and has stops every 5–10 km (3–6 mi) (about 3½ hours' travel time each way). It is possible to travel across the country by changing elektrychka trains two or three times. Tickets can be inexpensive, although such travel is uncomfortable.

Many Ukrainian elektrichkas are evolving into inter-city services. There are new direct lines such as the Kyiv-Rivne route, which is about 300 km (186 mi) long. This rail service is a cross between an elektrychka and a traditional train with sleeping cars. Such new trains have an increased level of comfort, with fewer stops. The longest routes for these more-comfortable elektrychkas are Zaporizhzhia–Kharkiv, Dnipro–Simferopol, Odesa–Khmelnytskyi, Odesa–Vinnytsia, Odesa–Kropyvnytskyi, Kyiv–Lutsk, Kyiv–Khmelnytskyi and Kyiv–Shostka, Lviv–Rivne and Lviv–Mukachevo.

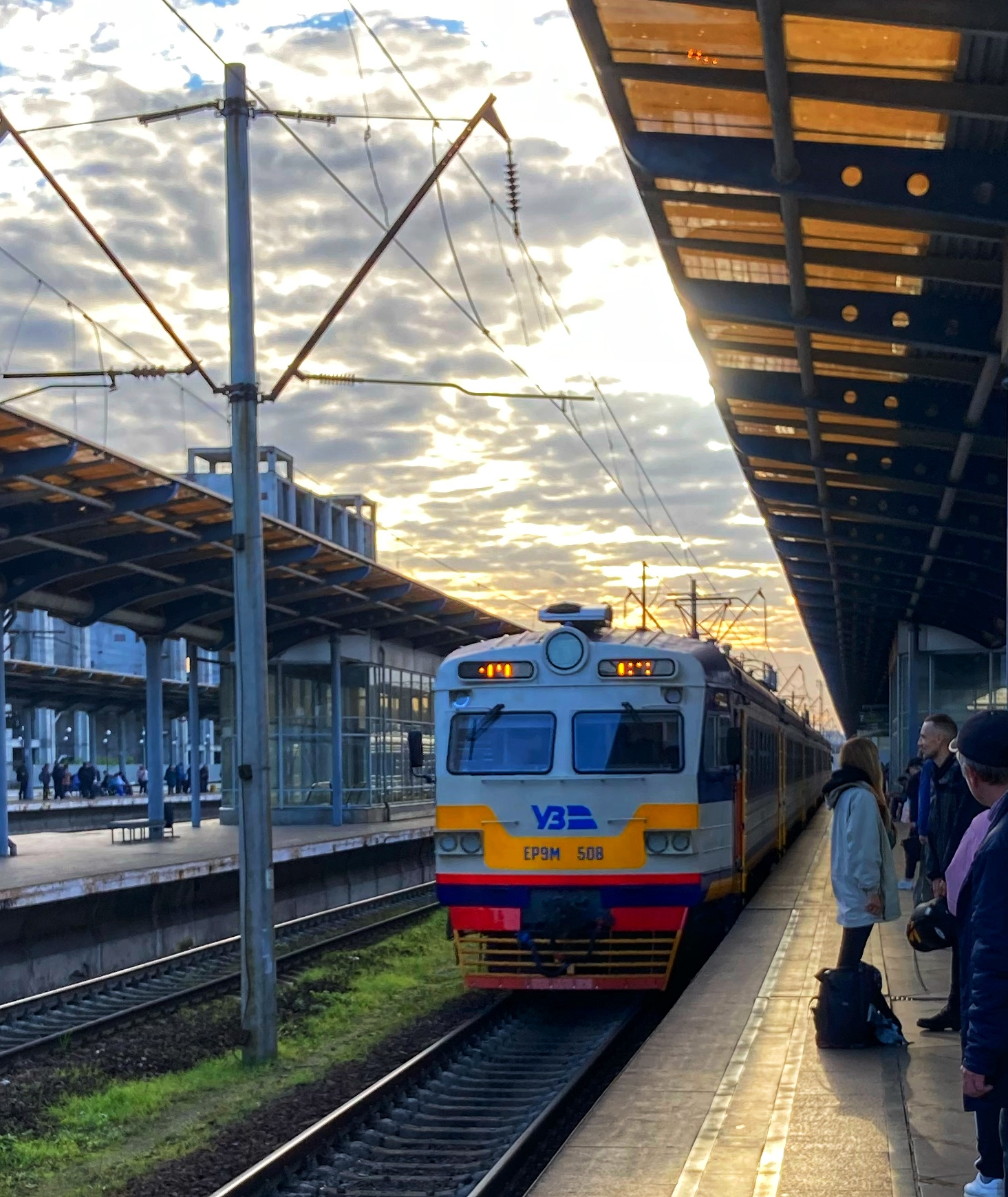
Kyiv Urban Electric Train ("Urban elektrychka") at Darnytsia Station

Ukrainian railways is capable of producing its own elektrychkas, but such efforts are limited by the unprofitability of the service. The only success has been a modernization of Riga trains undertaken by local companies. However, the elektrychka line in Debaltseve area is reported to be served by Ukrainian-made trains. Ukrainian elektrychkas are now produced in Luhansk, at the Luhanskteplovoz plant. New elektrychkas feature premium services like bar and children's cars, but they are only available on major routes. The largest elektrychka depot in Ukraine, serving Kyiv and the surrounding oblasts, is situated in Fastiv.

In Kyiv, since 2011, conventional elektrychka trains serve the municipal rail service, the Kyiv Urban Electric Train. Financially, the project significantly differs from traditional elektrychkas.

=== Kazakhstan ===
Kazakhstan operates a network of suburban and regional rail services managed by the national railway company, Kazakhstan Temir Joly (KTJ). Elektrichka services are concentrated around major urban and industrial centres, including Astana, Almaty, and Karaganda, while many routes on the country's largely unelectrified rail network are served by diesel-powered trains. Owing to the country's low population density and long distances between settlements, commuter rail services are generally less extensive than those in some other post-Soviet states.

Since the 2010s, KTJ has modernized its rolling stock through domestic production at the Electric Locomotive Assembly (EKZ) plant in Astana, operated in partnership with Alstom. New electric trains, domestically assembled at a manufacturing plant in Petropavl, have been introduced on several suburban and regional routes, including services between Astana and the Burabay resort area. These trains are equipped with amenities such as air conditioning, Wi-Fi, and power outlets.

=== Latvia ===
The main electric railway in Latvia is centered in the capital city of Riga. The first electrified trains connected Riga with the Dubulti station in the seaside resort of Jūrmala in 1950. By 1970, electrification extended westward towards Tukums. Used largely by commuters, the railway also has branches extending to Jelgava, Skulte and Aizkraukle. Parts of Latvia outside the Riga region are served by diesel trains. Upon regaining independence, the Latvian government removed the Soviet seals that appeared on many of the older green trains.

Because plans for a subway for Riga fell through in the 1980s, the railway remains the fastest way to travel around the city and its vicinity. In 2022, all Latvian electric railway routes operate various variants of ER2 trains, however they're expected to be phased out by 2024.

=== Estonia ===
The electric railway in Estonia connects the capital Tallinn with some of its vicinities. It extends from the Tallinn's central station Balti jaam in two main directions, eastward and westward, the total length of the lines being 132 kilometres (82 mi). The eastward line goes to Aegviidu. The westward line goes to the town Keila, where it divides into two, with one branch continuing towards the harbour town Paldiski and the other towards inland Riisipere. The Paldiski branch splits at Klooga, with a short branch going to a former popular beach resort Kloogaranna.

The first electrified line in Estonia was opened in 1924, connecting Tallinn with what was, back then, a town, Nõmme going as far as Pääsküla. Construction started in 1923 when government provided 34 million Estonian marks. The technology needed for the establishment of the electrical line was bought from German and Swedish companies (MAN, Siemens-Schuckert, ASEA).

Before the Soviet occupation began in 1940, electrical railways carried annually 6 million passengers and the rolling stock did comprise in total 20 passenger wagons: four electric railcars (M1-M4) and 16 railcar trailers. M1-M4s were "evacuated" to Soviet Union during the first week of Eastern Front in 1941.

All other electrified lines were created during the Soviet times. This was done by upgrading the standard railway track to electrical. ER1 electric trainset operated on the Estonian electrical railways from 1975 summer until writing of the last one was retired in 2005 summer. Since 2013, Stadler FLIRT trains are being used on Estonian electrical railways.

=== Slovakia ===
Tram systems in Slovak cities of Košice, Bratislava, and the light rail service connecting the city of Poprad with the various smaller towns and settlements at the base of the mountain range Vysoké Tatry are all locally known as električka.

== Social impact ==
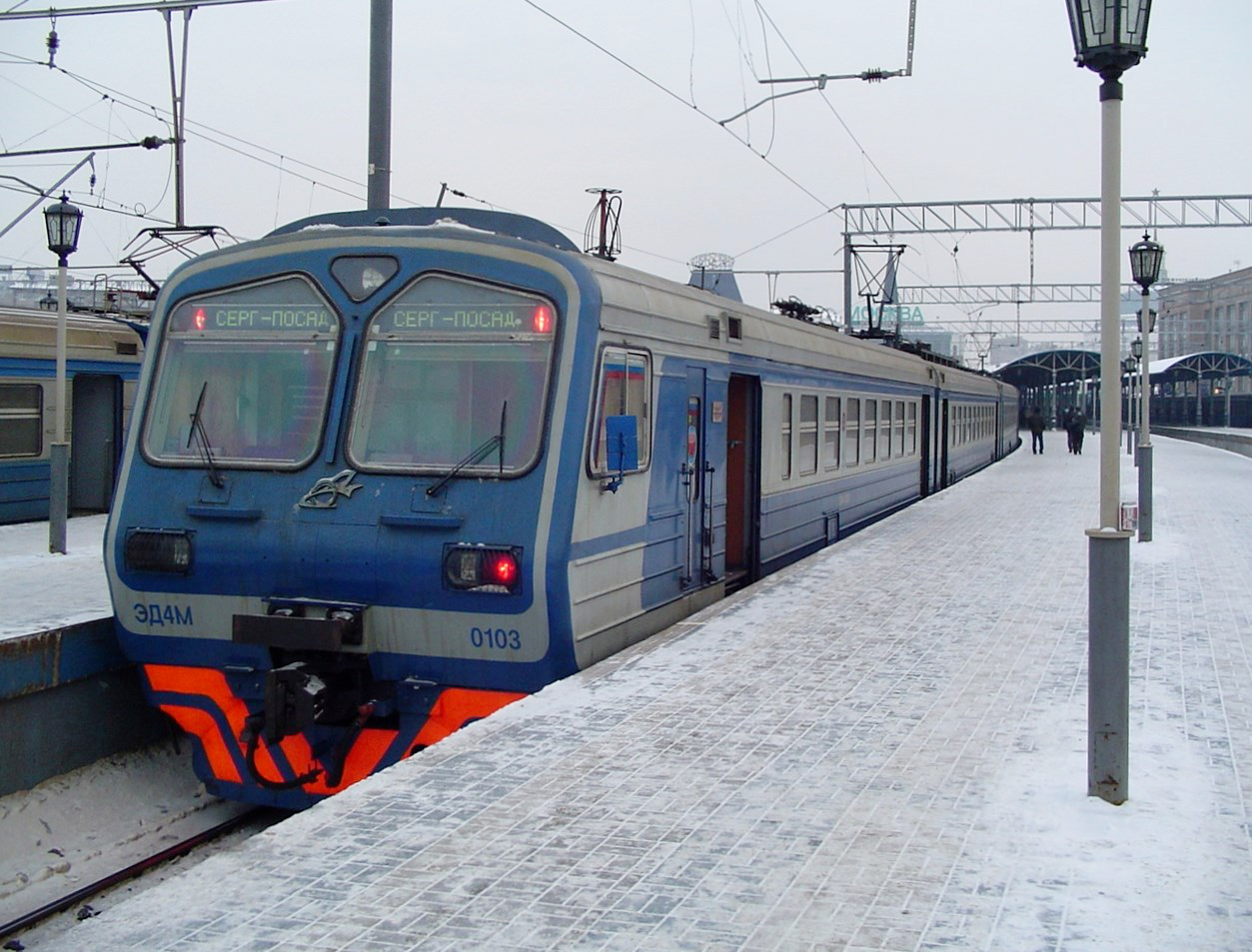
Old ED4M elektrichka at Moskva-Passazhirskaya Yaroslavskaya station, Moscow

Elektrichkas are an important means of transport in post-Soviet countries, providing a cheap and easily accessible connection between city and countryside. The railway network is well-developed, while bus service to towns and villages may be rare or unreliable. Automobile and truck ownership in rural areas is rare, and elektrichkas are relatively reliable and safe. They are useful for dachniks and peasants selling their harvest at city markets. Some areas also have roads in poor condition, so railroads have an advantage in speed and comfort.

The trains are also a popular means of suburban and commuter transport for the region's large cities such as Moscow, Saint Petersburg and Kyiv, being unaffected by traffic jams. However, traffic congestion in these areas leads to frequent delays or cancellation of trains. For this reason, passengers in these areas who can afford them often prefer buses or marshrutkas to elektrichkas. In addition, the period from 1 to 5:30 am (time varies, depending on area and schedule) may be used for track maintenance or to allow high-speed trains to pass through without being slowed by elektrichkas (which stop at many stations, every 1–2 km or so).

The governments and railway companies of these countries support elektrichka service. Although ticket prices are being raised, operational costs are subsidized. Even with this subsidy, many passengers bribe ticket agents to avoid paying full fare. Fake ticket agents have been known to steal money from passengers, and large luggage and pets are sometimes carried unpaid. Some elektrichka stops with low ridership lack ticket offices. Although a ticketless rider (if caught) must pay full fare, since he had no opportunity to get a ticket as there was no ticket office at his real or purported boarding station, no fine may be imposed on them if they say they boarded the train at a stop without a ticket office. Since the list of stops with no ticket office is well-known, this is sometimes used for fare evasion.

Elektrichka interior, passengers without ticket running away from ticket inspector

Poor people often use the elektrichkas for long-distance travel, because they are easy to ride without tickets and connect large and small stations. For example, it is possible to get from Moscow to Saint Petersburg for free via five elektrichkas, with stops at Tver, Bologoe, Okulovka and Malaya Vishera. This method of travel is called yezda na sobakakh (Russian: езда на собаках) or "dog-riding". This mode of travel is sometimes used by football fans. Elektrichkas have a high rate of on-board crime. As of 2008, there are new trains (generally on popular routes from Moscow and St. Petersburg) which are comfortable; some are operated by private companies and are safe, clean and well-maintained. These elektrichkas are usually high-speed and have few stops; tickets are more expensive, and such elektrichkas serve as true inter-city trains; cheaper trains often connect cities and their suburbs only.

In remote regions of Russia with no electrified railroads, elektrichkas and dizels are sometimes replaced by short trains of one or two passenger cars and one or two flatcars hauled by diesel locomotives, due to the harsh climate which does not allow the use of modern rolling stock. These are known as bichevoz (Russian: бичевоз, "hobo train").

== Cultural significance ==
As a social symbol in the former Soviet Union, the elektrichka is the subject of art and literature. Poslednyaya elektrichka (Russian: Последняя электричка, "The Last Elektrichka"), a twist song with music by David Tukhmanov and lyrics by M. Nozhkin, was popular in the Soviet Union; versions included those by Vladimir Makarov, Eduard Hil, Muslim Magomayev and Vadim Mulerman.

As always, you and I were together until late in the evening;

As always, this wasn't enough for us;
As always, your mother called you home.
So I headed for the train station.

Once again
The last elektrichka ran away from me
And I was
walking down the tracks,

Down the tracks on my way home.

The Kino song "Elektrichka" was released on their first album, 45.

In the vestibule, it's chilly but at the same time warm

In the vestibule, the air is full of cigarette smoke, but at the same time it's fresh
Why do I keep silent, why am I not shouting? I am silent.

The elektrichka is taking me where I don't want to go.

Scenes in some popular Soviet movies take place aboard elektrichkas; for example, the female protagonist of Moscow Does Not Believe in Tears meets her love interest on an elektrichka on her way home to Moscow from a dacha. Venedikt Erofeev's novel Moskva-Petushki is based around elektrichka travel. American television movie Citizen X depicts serial killer Andrei Chikatilo picking up nearly all of his victims at elektrichka train stations.

Elektrychka (the Ukrainian pronunciation of the term) is mentioned in one of songs by Ukrainian rock band Braty Hadiukiny.

== See also ==
- 101st kilometre
- History of rail transport in Russia
- Commuter Rail
- Limited-stop
- List of suburban and commuter rail systems
- Interurban, a similar system that existed in the United States
- Overhead lines
- Rail terminals
  - Paveletsky Rail Terminal, Moscow
  - Rizhsky Rail Terminal, Moscow
  - Varshavsky Rail Terminal, St.Petersburg
- Rail terminology
- Regional rail
- Russian Railways
- S-Bahn, the German speaking term for a similar system
- The Museum of the Moscow Railway
- Transport in Russia
- Transportation in Ukraine
- Rail transport in Ukraine
- Ukrzaliznytsia
