= Monument to Muslim Magomayev =

Azerbaijani sculptural work

- Azerbaijani: Müslüm Maqomayevin abidəsi
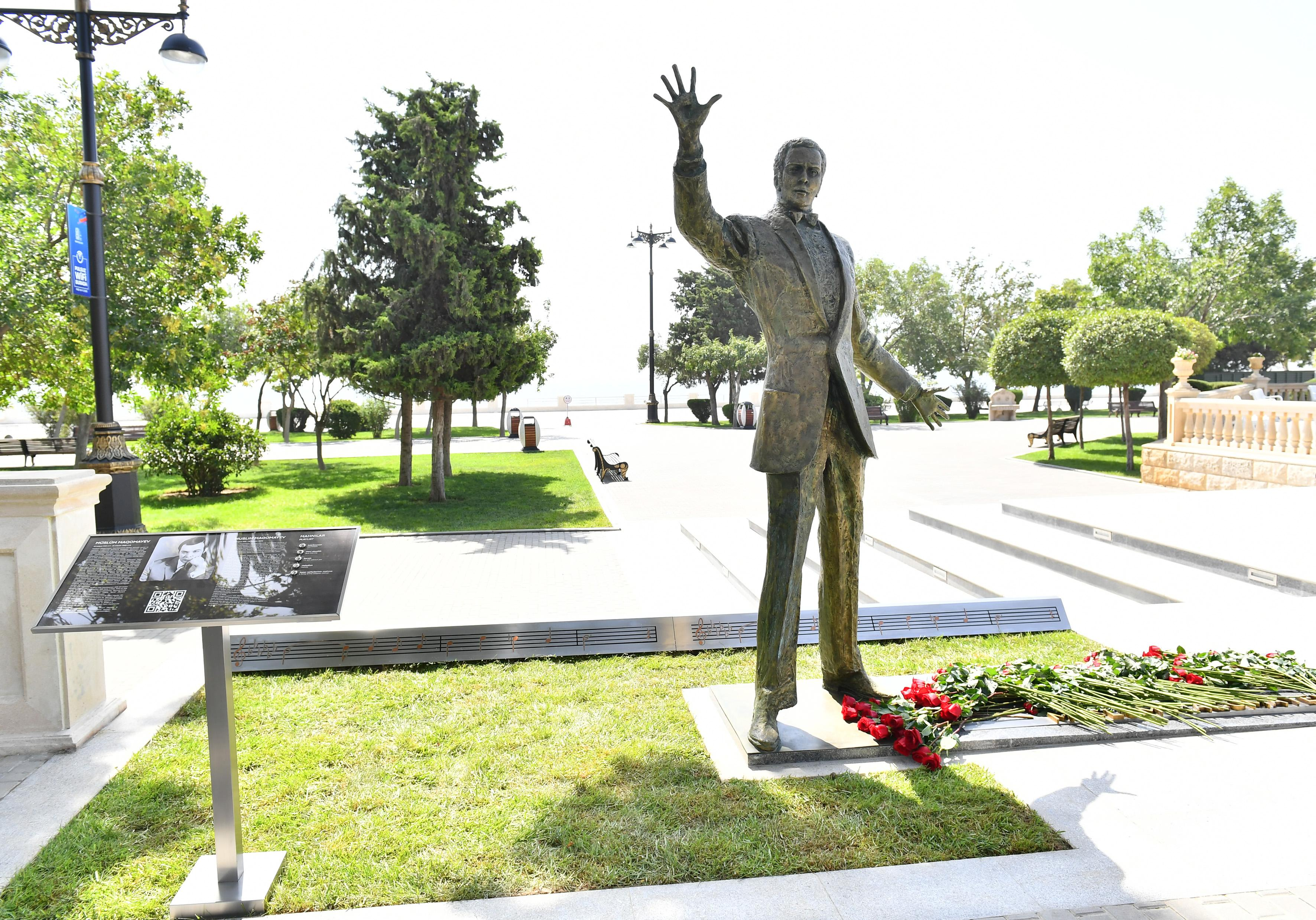
- Interactive map of Monument to Muslim Magomayev
- Location: Baku Boulevard, Baku, Azerbaijan
- Type: Memorial
- Material: Bronze
- Length: 2 m
- Opening date: April, 2023
- Dedicated to: Muslim Magomayev (musician)

The Monument to Muslim Magomayev is a sculptural work of the Azerbaijani sculptor and artist Omar Eldarov, dedicated to the Azerbaijani and Soviet opera, pop singer, People's Artist of the USSR Muslim Magomayev.

== History ==
On March 12, 2020, the President of the Republic of Azerbaijan Ilham Aliyev issued an order to erect a monument to Muslim Magomayev in the city of Baku. According to the order, the Executive Power of the city of Baku, together with the Ministry of Culture of the Republic of Azerbaijan, was instructed to carry out activities for the construction of the monument.

On August 17, 2022, a monument was opened in the Seaside National Park, which was attended by the President and First Vice-president of Azerbaijan, the wife of the singer - Tamara Sinyavskaya, Farhad Badalbeyli and others.

== Monument ==
The author of the monument was the People's Artist of the Republic of Azerbaijan, sculptor Omar Eldarov. The monument is cast in bronze. The height is 2 meters. An appropriate information board with inscriptions in Azerbaijani and English was installed in front of the monument.

== See also ==
- Muslim Magomayev (musician)
- Monument to Muslim Magomayev (Moskow)
