= Monument to Muslim Magomayev (Moscow) =

Monument in Moscow, Russia

- Russian: Памятник Муслиму Магомаеву
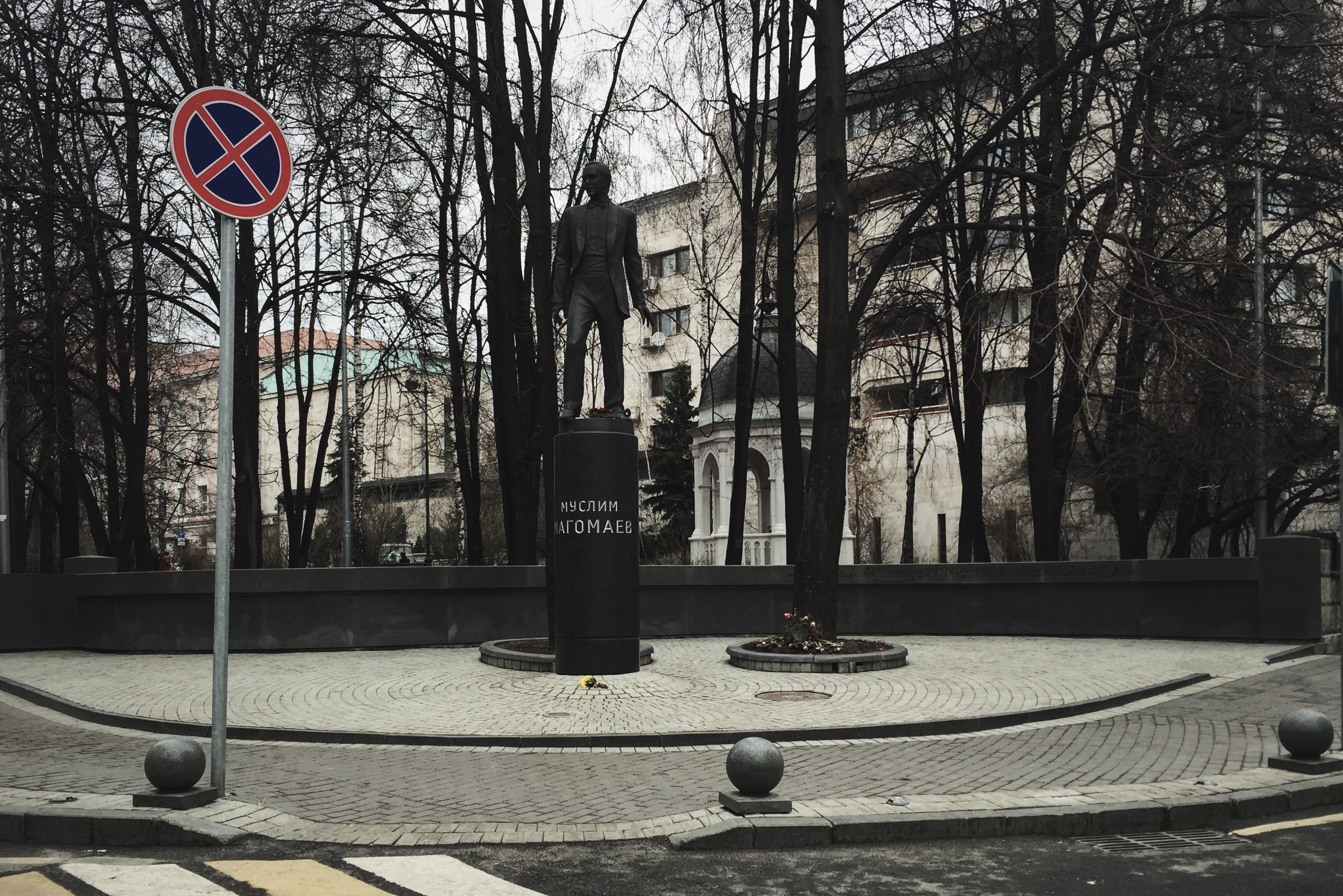
- Interactive map of Monument to Muslim Magomayev
- Location: Moscow, Russia
- Coordinates: 55°45′35″N 37°36′19″E
- Type: Memorial
- Material: Bronze, granite
- Length: 4.5 m
- Dedicated to: Muslim Magomayev (musician)

The Monument to Muslim Magomayev is a sculptural work of the Russian sculptor Alexander Iulianovich Rukavishnikov, dedicated to the Azerbaijani and Soviet opera, pop singer, People's Artist of the USSR Muslim Magomayev.

== History ==
After the death of Muslim Magomayev, the Moscow City Duma decided to erect his statue. The statue was to be financed by the Crocus Group. The monument is located at the intersection of Voznesensky and Yelisey streets in Moscow. Muslim Magomayev himself once lived near here.

The opening ceremony of the monument, which was prepared with the support of the Cultural and Musical Heritage Fund of Muslim Magomayev, founded by Araz Agalarov, the president of Crocus Company, took place on September 15, 2011. The laying ceremony was attended by the widow Tamara Sinyavskaya, Abulfas Garayev, Bedros Kirkorov, Yevgeni Gerasimov, Yuri Nikolaev, Tatiana Tarasova, Elena Obraztsova, Lyubov Sliska, President of Crocus International Aras Agalarov and friends of Muslim Magomayev. Somewhere on the monument, the words and notes of the song "You are my melody", which is one of the famous songs performed by Muslim, are written. A bronze statue of the singer stands on a granite pedestal. The height of the monument is 4.5 meters.

== See also ==
- Monument to Muslim Magomayev
- Muslim Magomayev
