= Vilnius Metro =

Proposed transit system in Vilnius, Lithuania

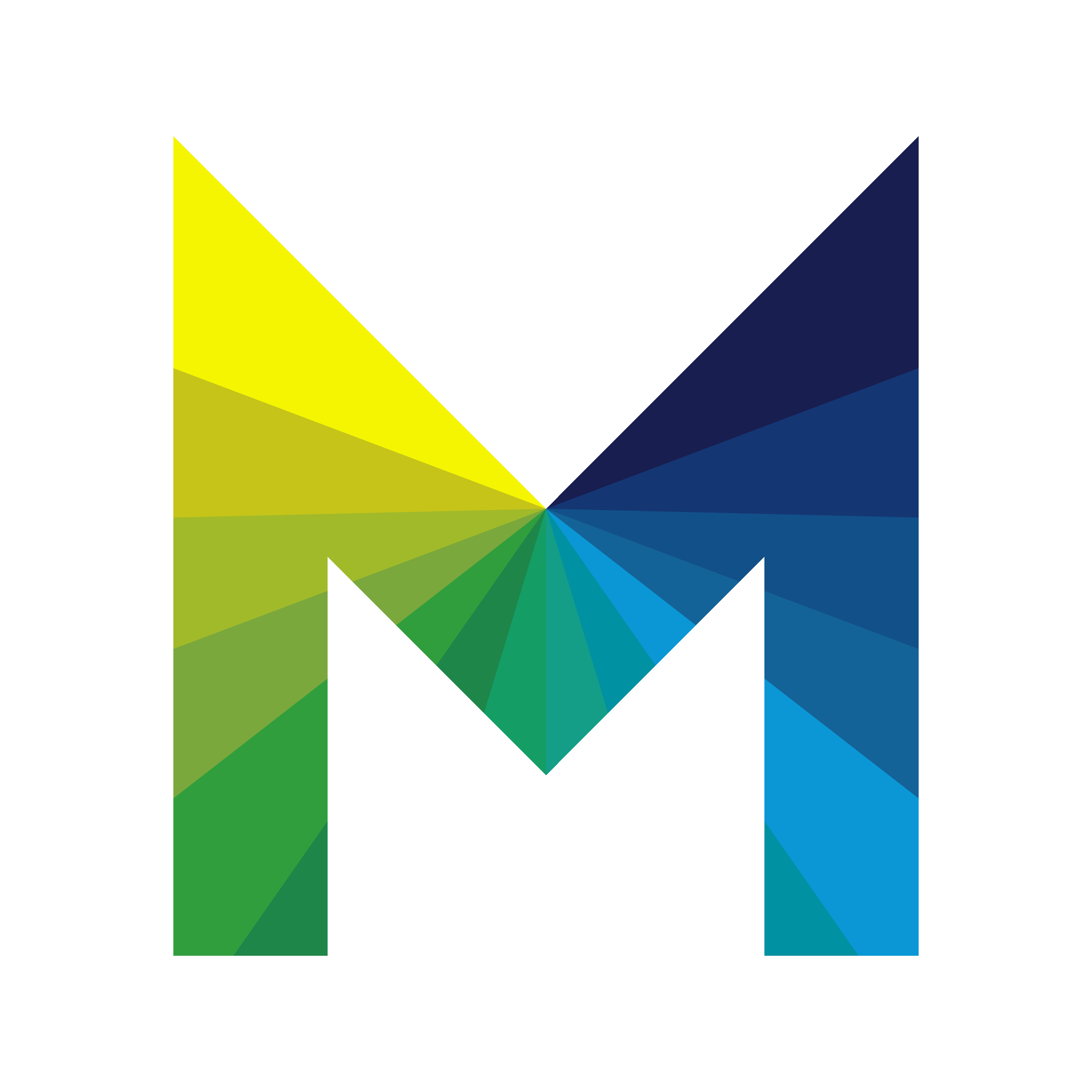

Overview
- Locale: Vilnius, Lithuania
- Transit type: Rapid transit
- Number of lines: 3
System map
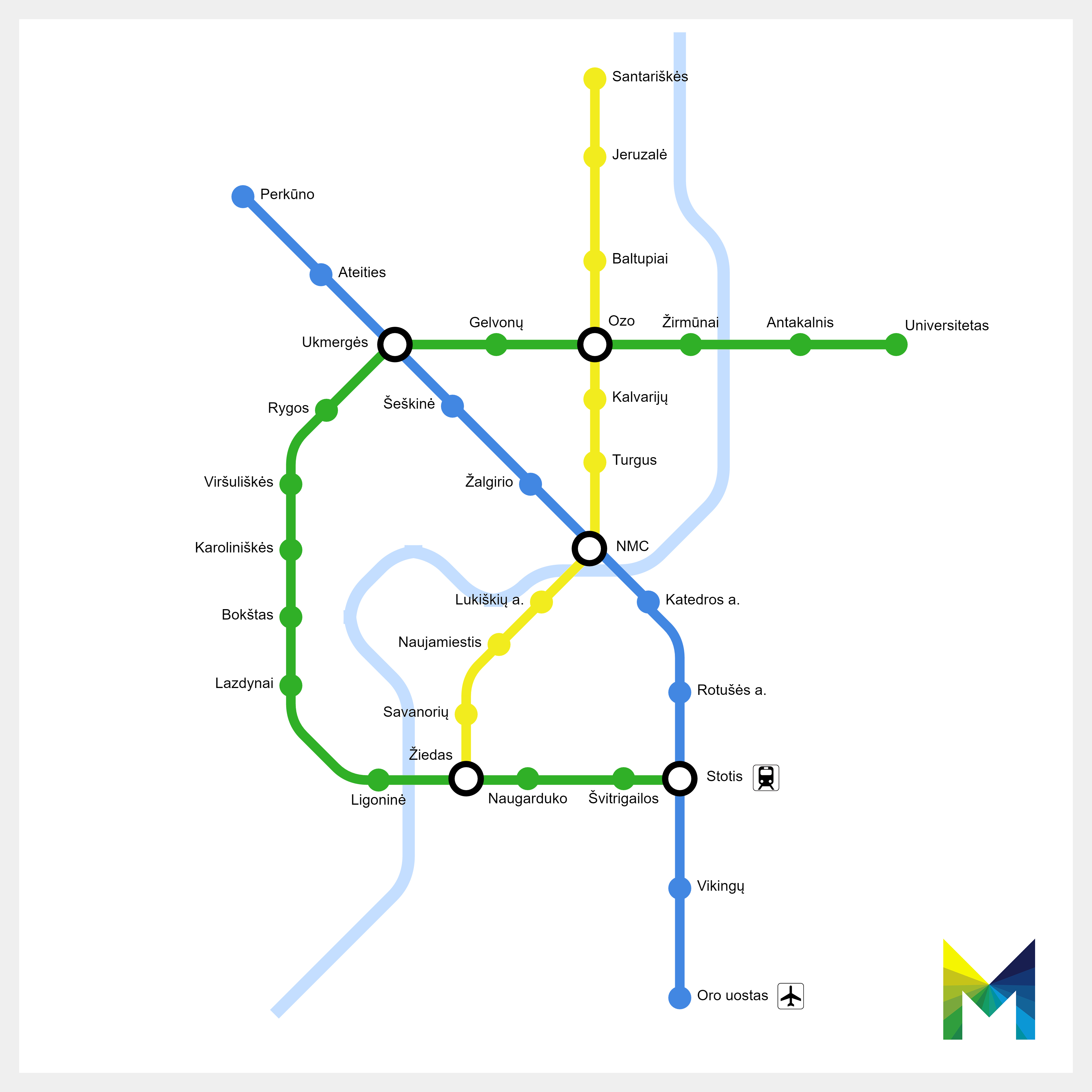

The Vilnius Metro (Lithuanian: Vilniaus metropolitenas) is a proposed rapid transit system in the Lithuanian capital Vilnius. Three lines have been proposed to connect the most bustling and densest city districts together. Its purpose is to address the notable decline of public transit usage's modal share and to relieve the significantly increased traffic congestion on the existing road infrastructure.

Although test drilling for a proposed Vilnius Metro had been conducted along a 50 metre stretch of Gediminas Avenue near the city's main railway station during the Soviet era, the current proposal dates to 2001 then-Mayor Artūras Zuokas request for international feasibility study. The proposal was approved as part of the city's master plan by the Vilnius Municipal Council in 2002. Systra was chosen by the city as a study partner; the Scott Wilson Group conducted a public-private financing feasibility study during 2005 and 2006.

As of 2007, the project was the subject of intense debate by politicians and citizens. The concerns include cost (an estimated €890,000,000 (equivalent to €1.22325×10^{9} in 2021), the possibility that vibrations would damage the historic buildings in Vilnius Old Town, and the closures of streets during construction. The project was accepted by the Lithuanian government on a concession basis in 2014, but Lithuanian president Dalia Grybauskaitė placed a veto on the law.

In 2018 the Seimas enacted a new act of metro development that went into effect on 1 January 2020. This act allows private investors to start construction of metro transit systems in Lithuania. The projects would have to be implemented by municipalities, which would be able to buy up to 50 per cent of shares of the construction companies. The projects would be developed in partnership or concession of the state and private companies.

In 2024, Mayor Valdas Benkunskas said the municipal transport company would tender the making of a feasibility study on building a metro or other new public transport system in the capital. In February 2026, Seimas member Tomas Tomilinas proposed building a metro line as a branch of the Rail Baltica railway, using funding earmarked for that project, while former mayor Artūras Zuokas instead proposed a cheaper "light metro" modelled on Copenhagen; the Benkunskas administration was more cautious, citing cost and a preference for expanding the existing bus and trolleybus network.

In March 2026, the transport authority JUDU began a market consultation and pre-design study for a new rail-based transport modality, expected to be finished by mid-2027, including a proposed fourth line from Naujieji Santariškės through Kalnėnai anticipating future residential growth. By May 2026, officials were targeting a new transit mode by 2040, while prioritizing a 30 percent expansion of the bus and trolleybus network by 2030 in the interim.

== Proposed lines ==
1. Pilaitė-Centre
2. Pašilaičiai-Central station-Lazdynai (A circle line)
3. Justiniškės-Antakalnis

== See also ==
- Riga Metro
