= Tamara Sinyavskaya =

Russian singer (born 1943)

Tamara Sinyavskaya Тамара Синявская
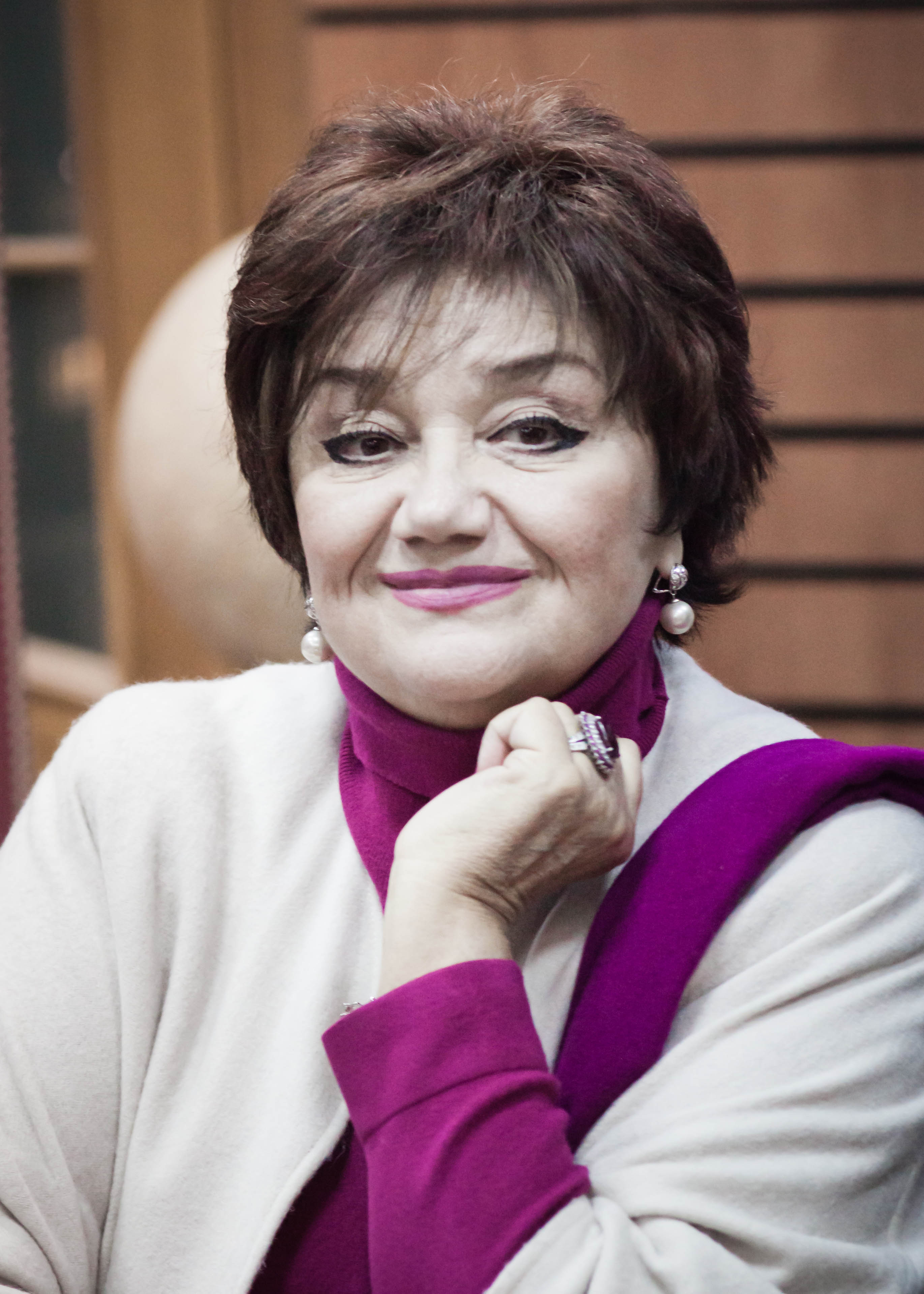
- Sinyavskaya in 2017

Background information
- Born: Tamara Ilyinichna Sinyavskaya; 6 July 1943 (age 83); Moscow, Russian SFSR, Soviet Union
- Occupation: Mezzo-soprano
- Spouse: Muslim Magomayev (m. 1974; died 2008)

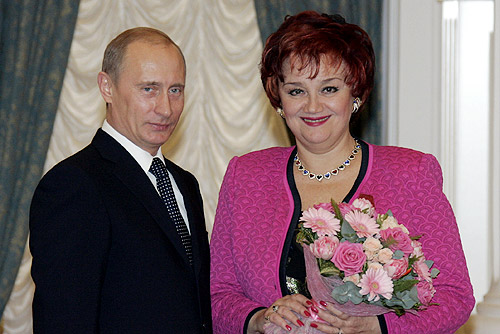
Vladimir Putin ja Tamara Sinyavskaya (2006)

Tamara Ilyinichna Sinyavskaya (Russian: Тамара Ильинична Синявская; born 6 July 1943) is a Soviet and Russian mezzo-soprano from the Bolshoi Theatre.

She was awarded the title of People's Artist of the USSR in 1982. In 1997, planet 4981 Sinyavskaya was named in her honor.

She was married to Soviet Azerbaijani singer Muslim Magomayev.

== Awards and honors ==
- Order of the Red Banner of Labour (1971)
- Honored Artist of the RSFSR (24 July 1973)
- People's Artist of the RSFSR (25 May 1976)
- Lenin Komsomol Prize (1980)
- Order of the Badge of Honour (14 November 1980)
- People's Artist of the USSR (30 April 1982)
- Order of Honour (22 March 2001)
- People's Artiste of Azerbaijan (10 September 2002)
- Shohrat Order (5 July 2003)
- Order "For Merit to the Fatherland", 4th class (15 February 2006)
- Dostlug Order (4 July 2013)
- Sharaf Order (5 July 2018)
- Badge of Distinction "For Mentoring" (24 May 2023)
- Honorary Diploma of President (Azerbaijan) (6 July 2023)
- Golden Mask (2023)
