= Badge of Distinction "For Mentoring" =

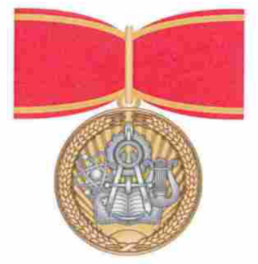
- Type: Badge of Distinction
- Awarded for: High achievements in government, economic, scientific, sociocultural, public, sport and charitable activities
- Presented by: the Russian Federation
- Eligibility: Russian citizens
- Status: Active
- Established: 2 March 2018
- First award: 15 March 2018
- Final award: 15 October 2025

Highlights
- Total: 365
- Ribbon

Precedence
- Next (higher): Decoration "For Beneficence"
- Next (lower): Decoration For Impeccable Service

Badge of Distinction "For Mentoring" (Russian: Знак отличия «За наставничество») is a state award of the Russian Federation.

== History ==
Badge of Distinction "For Mentoring" was established by Decree of the President of Russia dated March 2, 2018 No. 94 "On the establishment of the insignia "For Mentoring".

The proposal to establish a badge came on February 14, 2018, from the commander of the Aeroflot flight training squad, Nikolai Izosimov, at the "Mentor" forum, which was held with the participation of president Vladimir Putin at his Novo-Ogaryovo residence.

A number of authors believe that this award is a revival of the honorary title "Honored Youth Mentor of the RSFSR" that existed in the RSFSR since 1981, which was established in accordance Resolution of the Central Committee of the Communist Party of the Soviet Union, the Council of Ministers of the Soviet Union and the All-Russian Central Council of Trade Unions of December 13, 1979 "On further strengthening labor discipline and reducing staff turnover in the national economy". Thus, the provision on the Badge of Distinction "For Mentoring" almost verbatim copies the provision on the honorary title "Honored Mentor of Youth of the RSFSR".

== Criteria and regulation ==
The distinction "For Mentoring" is awarded to the best youth mentors from among highly qualified workers in industry and agriculture, transport, engineering and technical workers, state and municipal employees, teachers, professors and other employees of educational organizations, doctors, cultural workers and artists for personal merit. for at least five years:

- In assisting young workers and specialists, including young representatives of creative professions, in their successful acquisition of professional knowledge, skills and abilities, in their professional development;
- In the acquisition by young workers and specialists of work experience in their specialty, the formation of their practical knowledge and skills;
- In providing constant and effective assistance to young workers and specialists in improving forms and methods of work;
- In carrying out effective work to educate young workers and specialists, increase their social activity and form a civic position.

The Badge "For Mentoring" is worn on the right side of the chest and is located after the insignia "For Beneficence."

For special occasions and possible everyday wear, a miniature copy of the "For Mentoring" insignia is worn. A miniature copy of the "For Mentoring" insignia is worn on the left side of the chest.

When wearing a ribbon of the Badge "For Mentoring" on uniform, it is located on the bar after the ribbon of the Decoration "For Beneficence".

== Description ==
The badge made of silver with gilding. It is a round medal with a diameter of 32 mm with a convex edge on both sides.

On the front side of the sign, in the lower part, the rising sun is depicted. Against the background of the sun's rays there are stylized symbolic images of the sign of an atom, a book, a gear, a compass and a silver lyre. Along the circumference of the sign is a wreath of golden-colored wheat ears.

On the reverse side of the badge there is a relief inscription: "For mentoring" and the number of the insignia.

The sign is connected using a ring to a ribbon laid in a bow.

The ribbon is silk, moiré, scarlet with a golden border around the edges. The width of the ribbon is 24 mm, the width of the golden border is 2 mm. The distance from the border to the edge of the tape is 2 mm.

A miniature copy of the sign is worn on a ribbon arranged in a bow. The diameter of the sign is 16 mm, the width of the tape is 12 mm.

When wearing the ribbon of the insignia "For Mentoring" on uniforms, a strip with a height of 8 mm is used, the width of the ribbon is 24 mm.
