= Ziepniekkalns =

Neighborhood of Riga, Latvia

Coordinates: 56.95°N 24°E

- Neighborhood of Riga
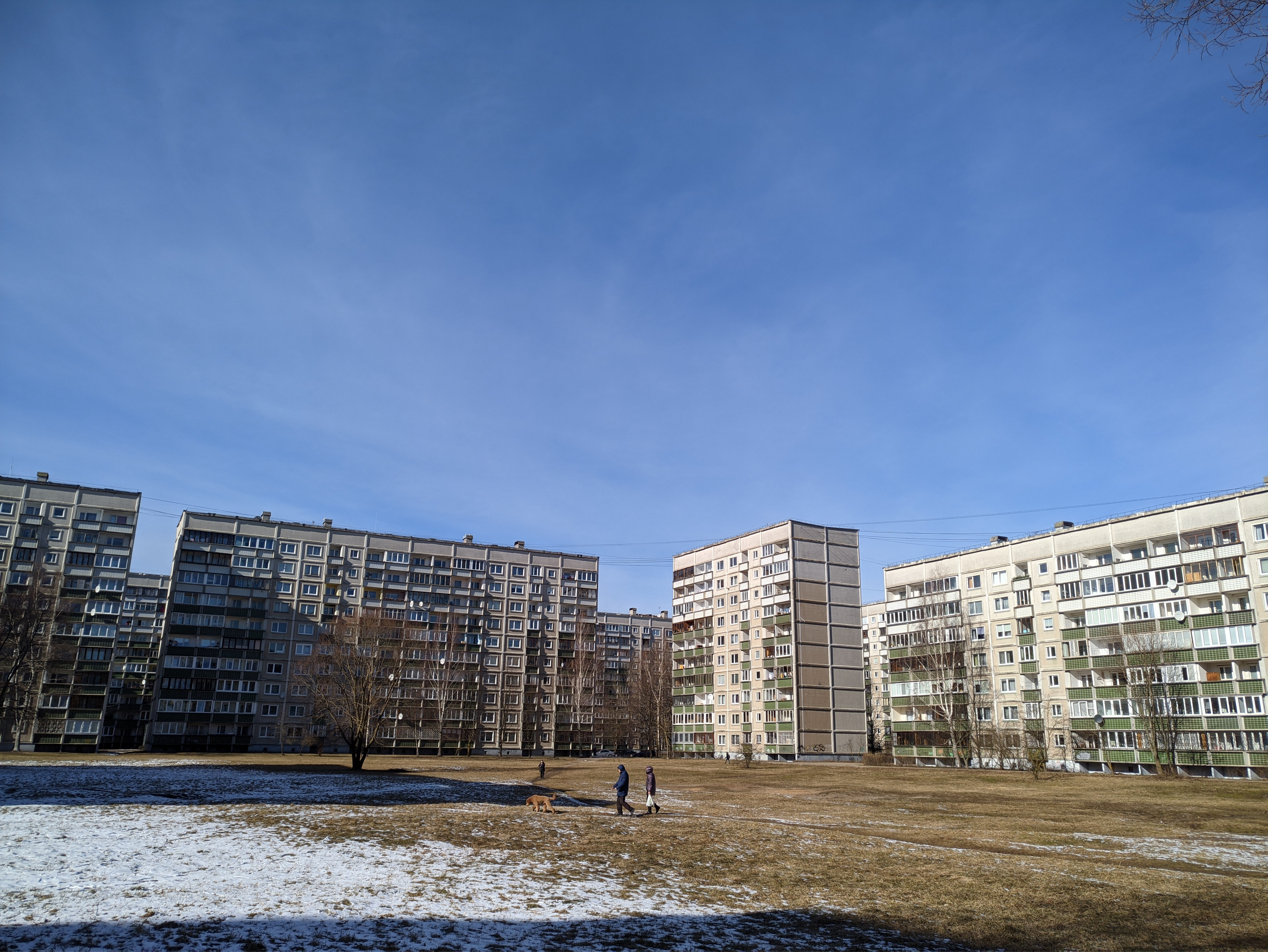
- Typical inner yard in Ziepniekkalns (2022)

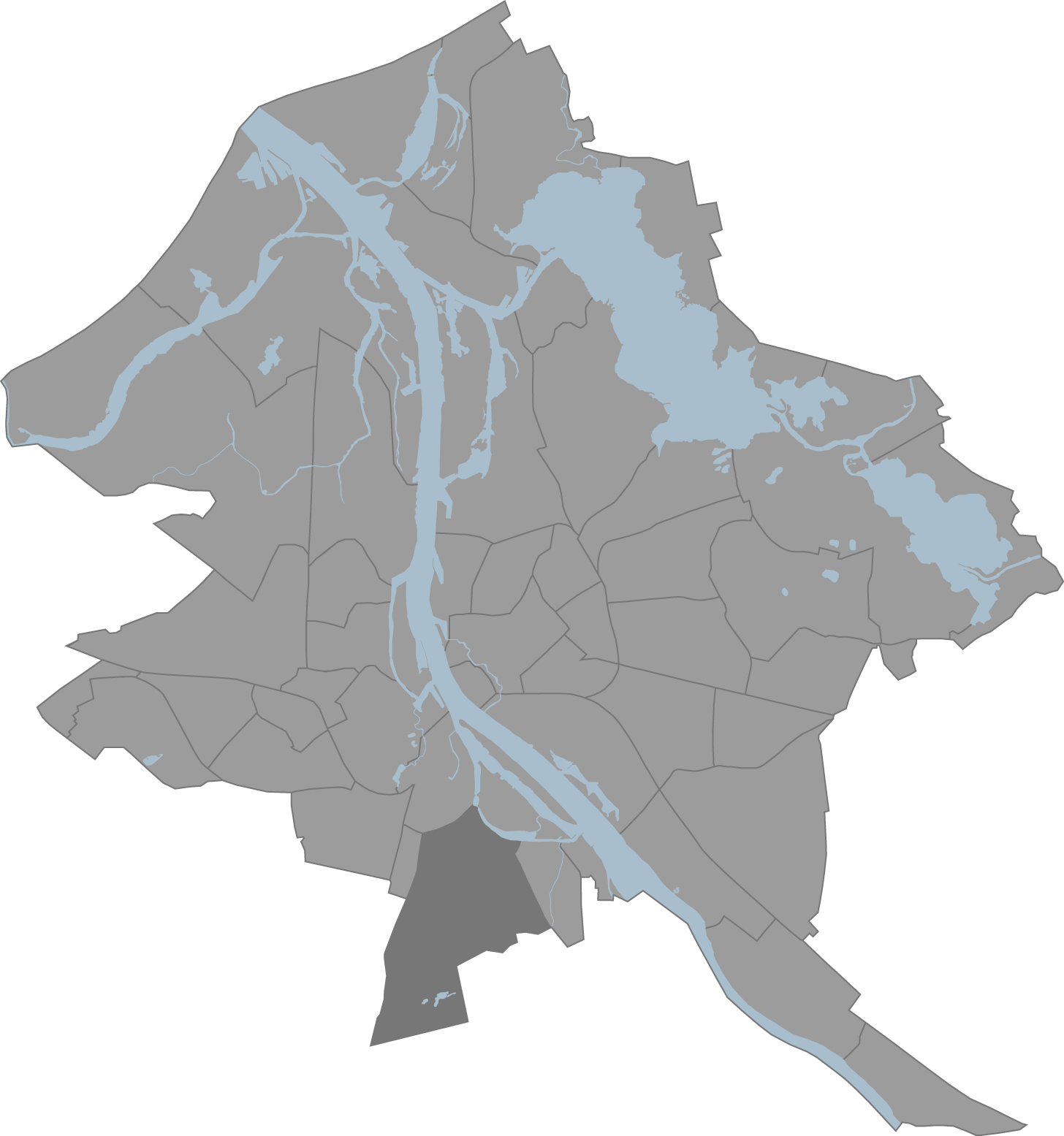
- Location in Riga
- Country: Latvia
- City: Riga
- District: Zemgale Suburb

Area
  - Total: 10.917 km^{2} (4.215 sq mi)

Population (2024)
  - Total: 29,826
  - Density: 2,732.1/km^{2} (7,076.0/sq mi)
- Time zone: UTC+2 (EET)
  - Summer (DST): UTC+3 (EEST)
- Postal code: LV-1058
- Website: apkaimes.lv

Ziepniekkalns is a neighborhood in Riga, Latvia. It is located in the Pārdaugava district of Riga, close to the city's southern border. Ziepniekkalns is the newest of Riga's neighborhoods.

Since the medieval period, several manors were located in the territory of the neighborhood (Ēbelmuiža Manor, Bišumuiža Manor, and others). A small part of what is now Ziepniekkalns was already included in the administrative borders of Riga in 1786; however, the central part of the neighborhood did not become part of the city until 1828 (as Seifenberg). The territory of Ziepniekkalns was further expanded in 1924 and 1974.

City infrastructure started to develop in Ziepniekkalns in the late 19th century. There were several factories and houses for workers in Ziepniekkalns. After the First World War, many private houses were constructed there, and there was a tram line from the city center to Bišumuiža Manor.

As a complex neighborhood, it has developed since the 1970s. In 1972 the first building plan was adopted. The plan was adjusted in 1987, when construction work started. According to the plan, four separate microdistricts were built with administrative buildings and a shopping mall along Valdeķu Street. Today the neighborhoood primarily consists of Soviet-era ten-story apartment buildings. However, there are still many older buildings from the early 1960s in Ziepniekkalns. There is a stark contrast between the older three-story buildings and the newer ten-story ones. The last apartment blocks were built in the early 1990s; however the planned construction was not completed due to the collapse of the USSR.

In the mid-1990s, the route 19 trolleybus line was extended to the heart of Ziepniekkalns, with its final stop now at the Mego supermarket. Trolleybus route 4 runs through the city center to Jugla.

== Gallery ==
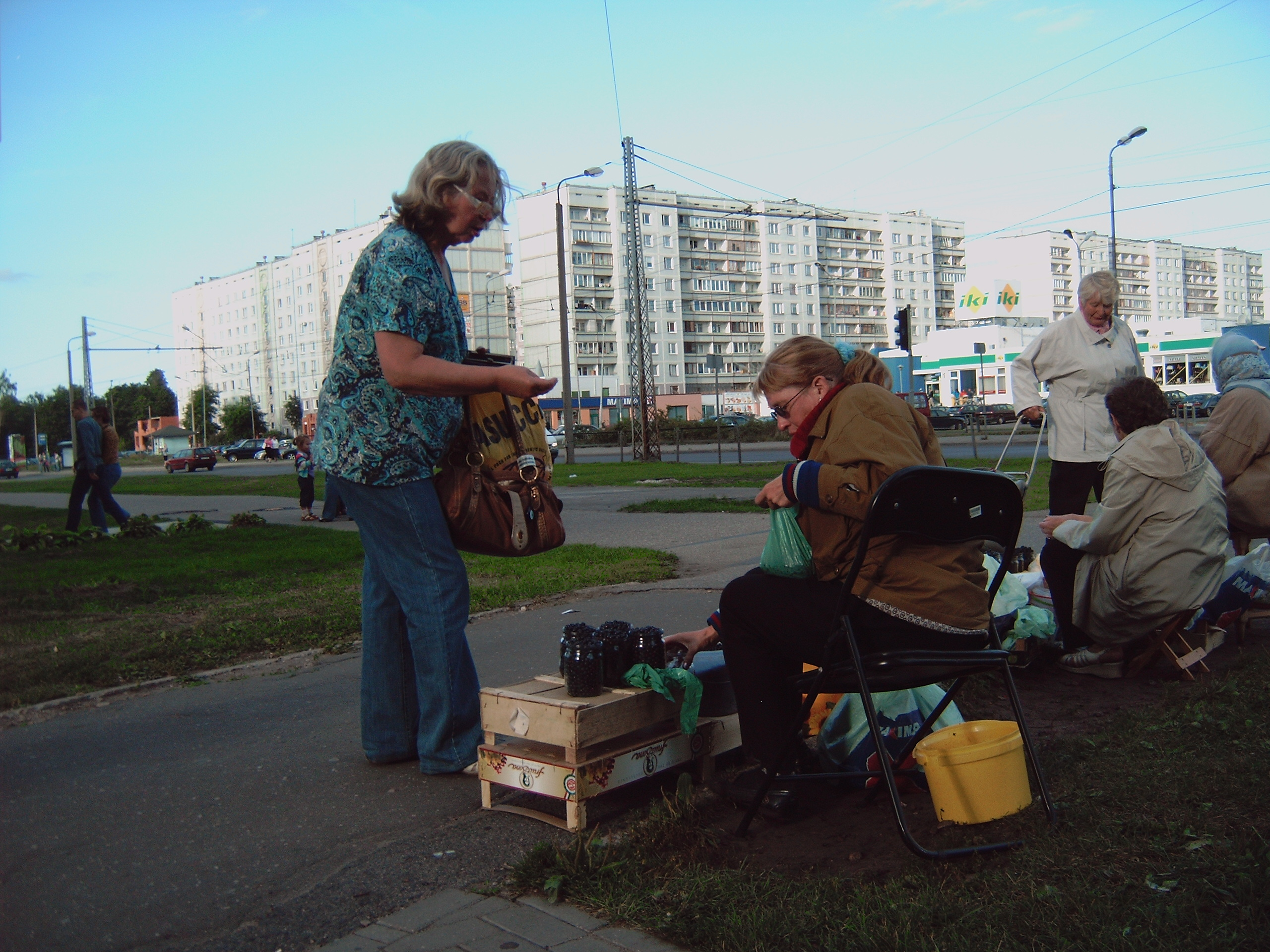
Street market in Ziepniekkalns

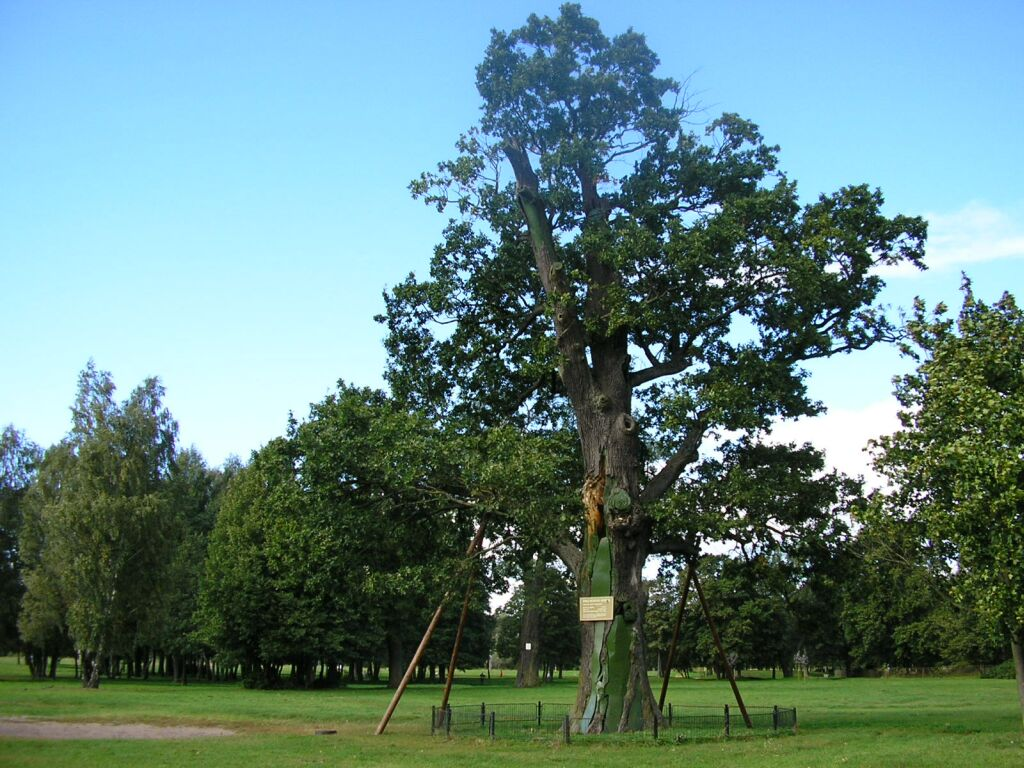
Ancient oak tree of Ēbelmuiža

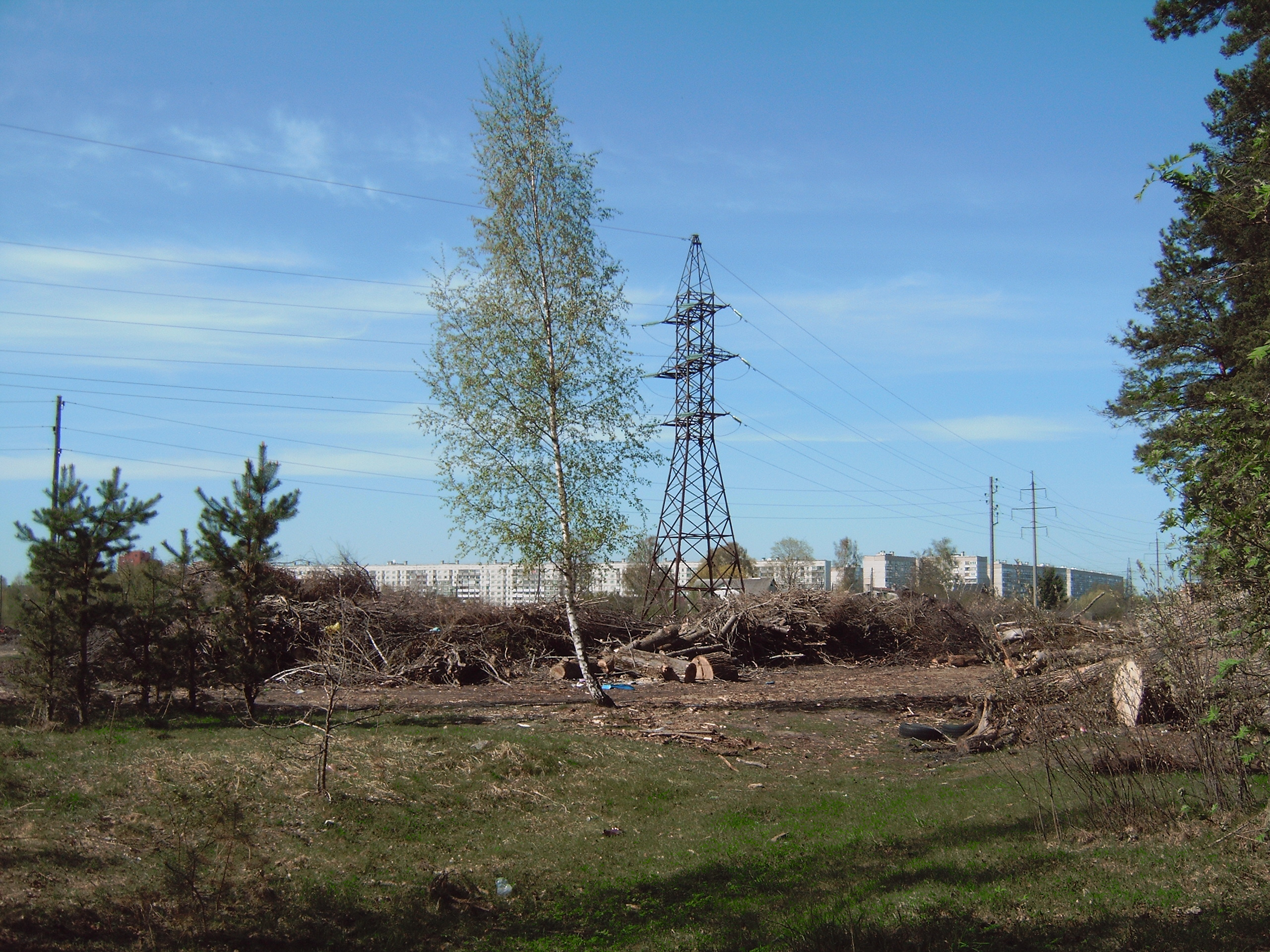
Ziepniekkalns forest

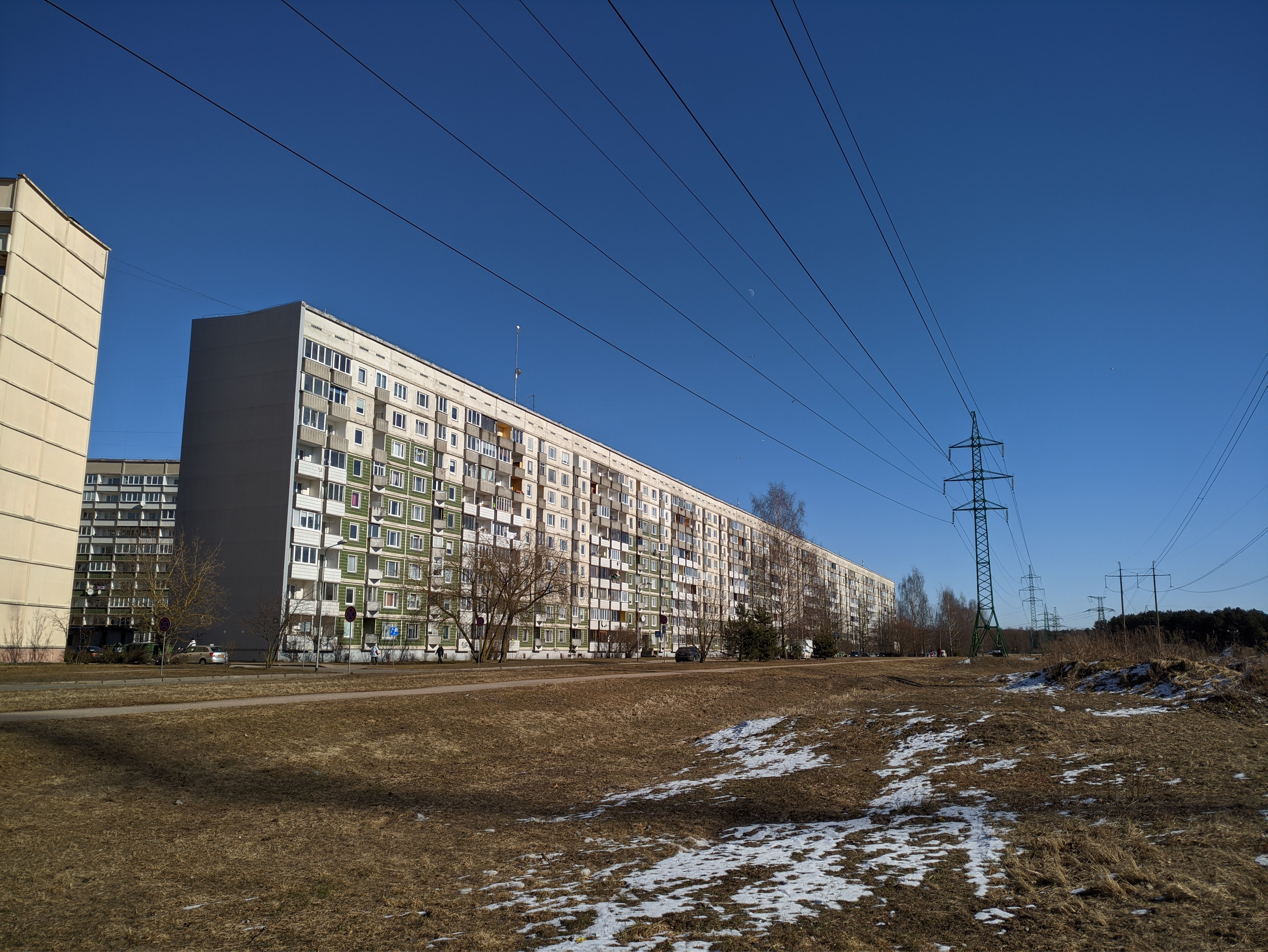
The longest apartment building in Latvia, Ozolciema Street 18

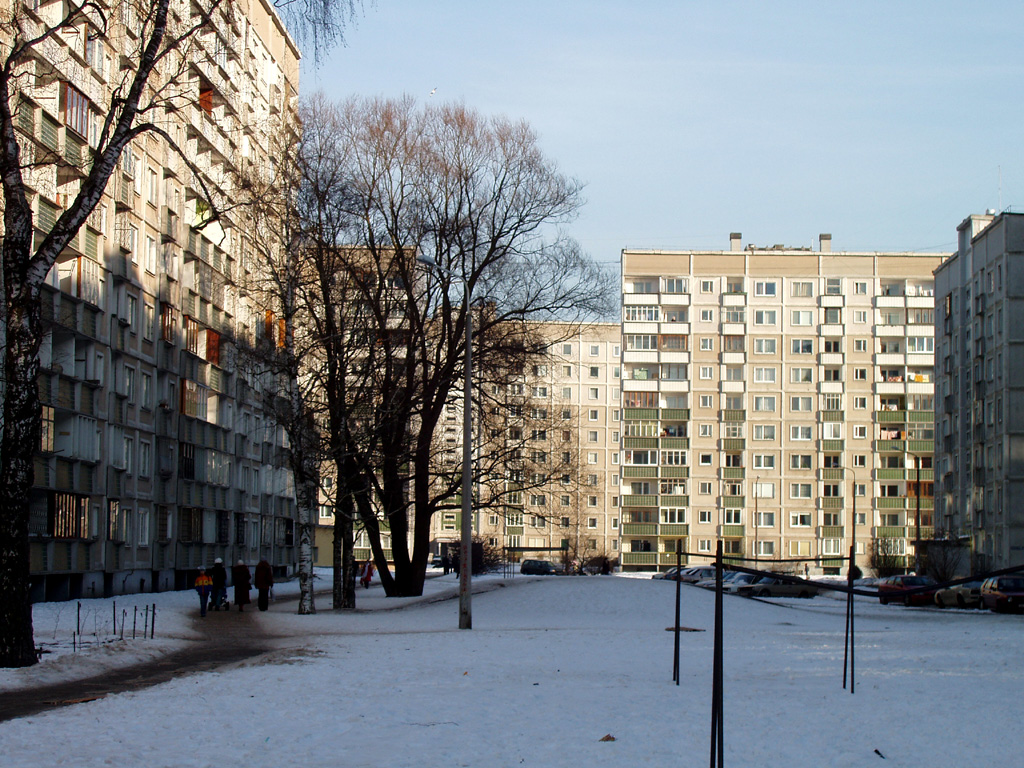
Typical inner yard in Ziepniekkalns

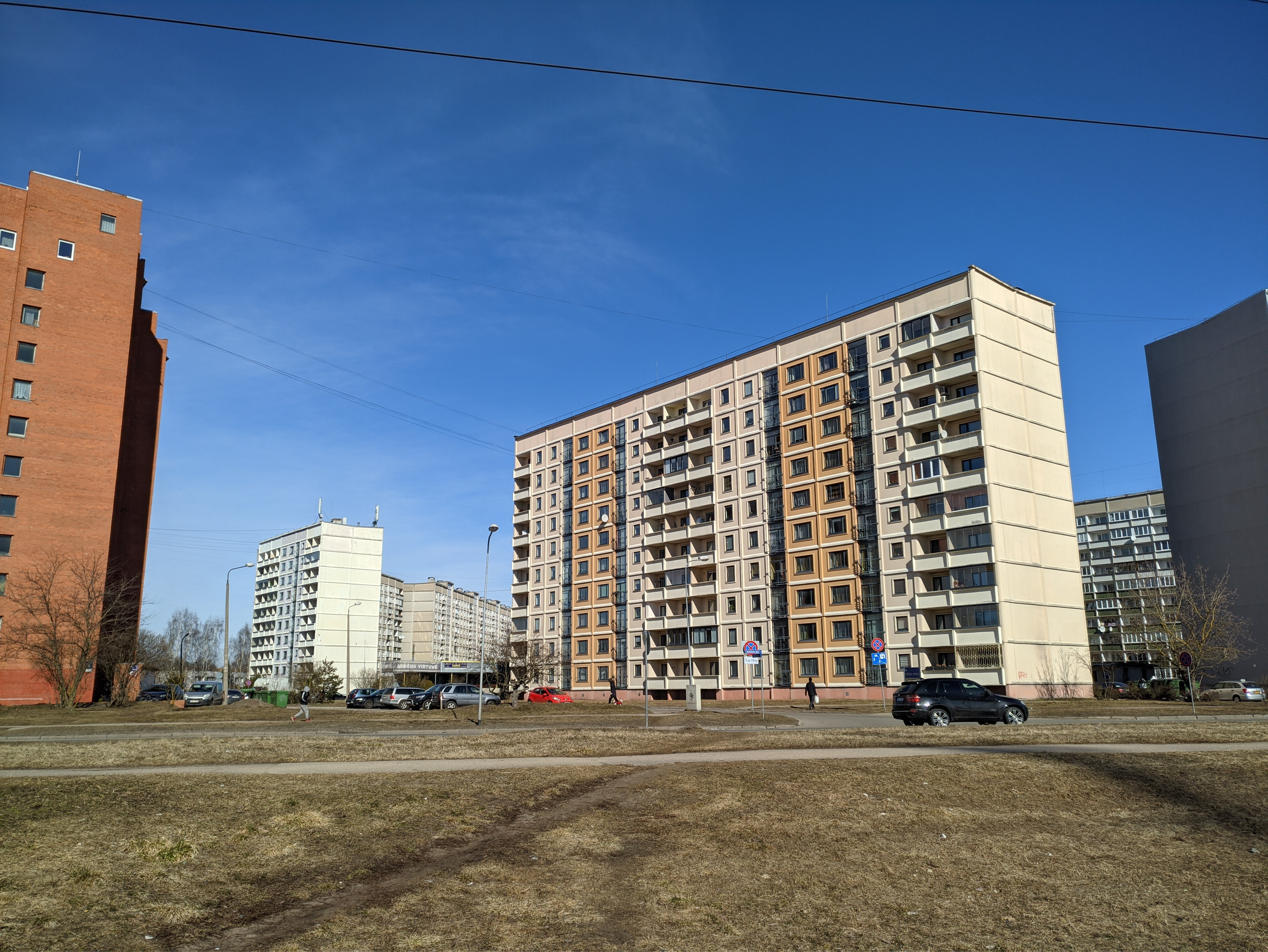

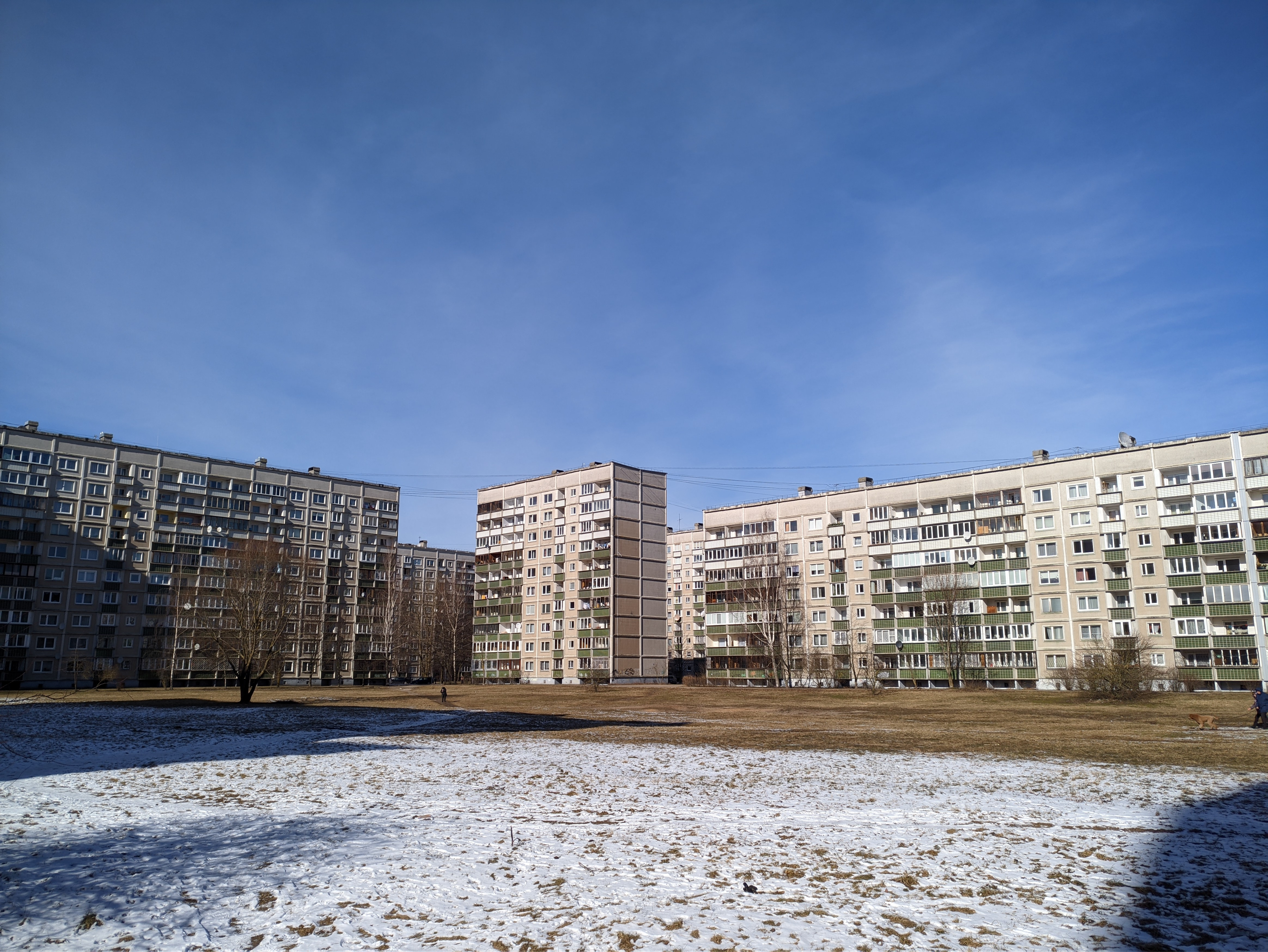

== Sources ==
- Jērāns, Pēteris (1988). Latvijas padomju enciklopēdija: Rīga. Rīga: Valērija Belokoņa izdevniecība. p. 733. ISBN 9984-9482-2-6.
