= Muslim Magomayev (musician) =

Russo-Azerbaijani singer (1942–2008)

- Муслим Магомаев; Müslüm Maqomayev
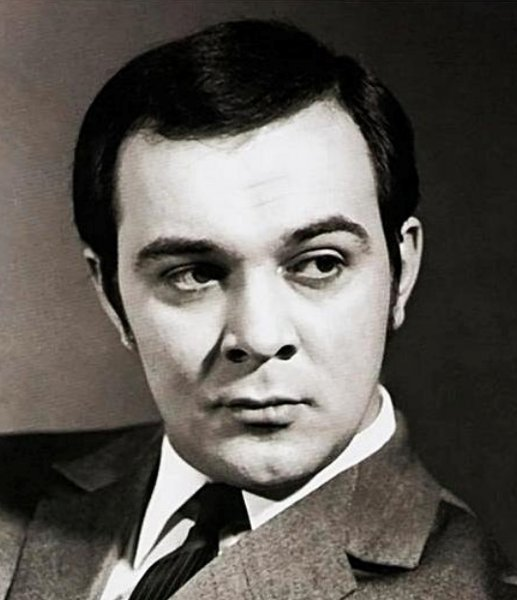
- Born: Muslim Muhammad oghlu Magomayev; 17 August 1942; Baku, Azerbaijan SSR, Soviet Union
- Died: 25 October 2008 (aged 66); Moscow, Russia
- Resting place: Alley of Honor, Baku, Azerbaijan
- Occupations: Singer, composer, actor
- Years active: 1962–2008
- Title: People's Artist of the USSR (1973)
- Spouses: Ofelia Veliyeva (m. 1960; div. 1961) Tamara Sinyavskaya (m. 1974)
- Children: 1
- Relatives: Muslim Magomayev (paternal grandfather)
- Awards: Istiglal Order (Azerbaijan); Shohrat Order (Azerbaijan); Order of Honour (Russia); Order of the Red Banner of Labour (USSR); Order of Friendship of Peoples (USSR)
- Musical career
- Genres: Pop; Operatic pop; Opera
- Instruments: Vocals; Piano

Signature
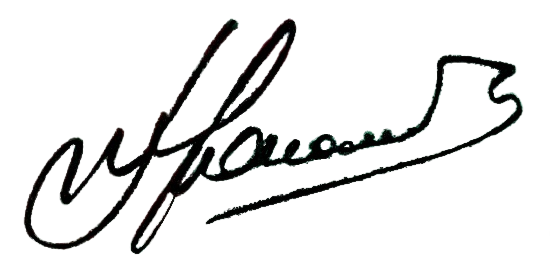

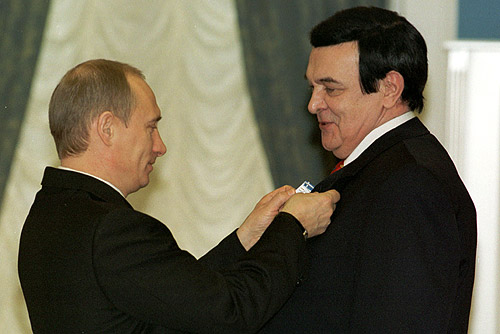
Vladimir Putin and Muslim Maqomayev (2002)

Muslim Muhammad oghlu Magomayev (Note: Or Muslim Magometovich Magomayev (Russian: Муслим Магометович Магомаев, pronounced [mʊˈslʲim məɡɐˈmʲetəvʲɪtɕ məɡɐˈmajɪf])) (Azerbaijani: Müslüm Məhəmməd oğlu Maqomayev / Мүслүм Мәһәммәд оғлу Магомајев; (Note: Azerbaijani: [myˈslym mæˈhæmːæt oɣˈlu mɑɡoˈmɑjef]) 17 August 1942 – 25 October 2008), dubbed the "Soviet Sinatra", was a Soviet and Russo-Azerbaijani opera and pop singer. He achieved widespread recognition throughout Russia and the post-Soviet world for his vocal talent and charisma, including a People's Artist of the USSR award in 1973.

== Early life ==
Muslim Magomayev represented one of the most respected artistic dynasties in Azerbaijan. His grandfather Muslim Magomayev (1885–1937), a friend and contemporary of the prominent Azerbaijani composer Uzeyir Hajibeyov, was one of the founders of modern Azerbaijani classical music. Magomayev's father, Mahammad Magomayev, who died two days prior to the defeat of Nazi Germany in World War II while serving as a soldier in the Soviet Army, was a gifted scenic designer; and his mother, Aishet Kinzhalova, was an actress, who deserted him with his paternal grandmother when he was less than a year old. Magomayev's father was of mixed origin whose parents moved to Azerbaijan from Chechnya and Georgia respectively, whereas his Adygea-born mother was paternally of Turkish origin and maternally of Circassian (Adyghe) and Russian descent. However, when asked about his ethnicity, Magomayev considered himself Azerbaijani.

After his adoption by his grandmother he learned to play the piano as a child, and began to take voice lessons at the age of 14. As a teenager, he became interested in Italian songs, American jazz, and other styles of popular music. He majored in piano and composition at the Baku Academy of Music.

== Musical career ==
Cavatina di Figaro
Largo al factotum, an aria from The Barber of Seville by Gioachino Rossini

"Luch solntsa zolotovo"
The troubadour's serenade from On the Trail of the Bremen Town Musicians, a Soviet animation musical cartoon. Music by Gennady Gladkov

He was 19 when he first performed at an international youth music festival in Helsinki. His performance was noted by Yekaterina Furtseva, then Minister of Culture of the Soviet Union, who offered him to be a soloist at the Bolshoi Theatre. Magomayev declined the offer. In 1962, at the age of 20, Magomayev first appeared in Moscow where he performed during the Days of Azerbaijani Culture. He sang an aria from Gounod’s Faust, and the song "Do the Russians Want War?" in a gala concert at the Kremlin Palace of Congresses, and became a celebrity on the spot. He recorded three songs with Azerbaijani composer Asya Sultanova. A year later, he gave his first solo concert in the Moscow Tchaikovsky Concert Hall to a full house and became a soloist of the Azerbaijan State Academic Opera and Ballet Theater. Muslim earned fame in the USSR as an opera singer with his performance in Rossini's "The Barber of Seville". He also became known for his arias from Puccini's "Tosca", Hajibeyov's "Koroghlu" and "Shah Ismayil", which was composed by his grandfather.

In 1964 and 1965, Muslim was a visiting artist at La Scala in Milan, but turned down the invitation to sing in the Moscow Bolshoi Theatre upon his return. Instead, the singer turned to popular music, becoming a cult figure of soviet estrada for several generations of music lovers in the Soviet Union. Muslim Magomayev's popularity in the USSR was overwhelming. He used to give three concerts a day filling huge arenas all across the Soviet Union, while his albums sold millions.

In 1966 and 1969, Magomayev performed in Olympia with great success. The director of Olympia Bruno Coquatrix offered him a contract, and Magomayev was seriously considering an opportunity to pursue an international career, but Yekaterina Furtseva refused to grant the Ministry of Culture's permission, claiming that it needed Magomayev to perform at government concerts. In 1969, he received the Midem Gold Disc Award in Cannes for album sales of over 4.5 million units. In 1973, at the age of 31, Muslim was awarded the Soviet Union's highest artistic title: People's Artist of the USSR.

Magomayev moved to Moscow in the early 1970s. He became the art director of the Azerbaijan State Bandstand-Symphonic Orchestra in 1975 and toured in Italy, France, Bulgaria, Finland, Canada, United States, Cuba and other countries.

Magomayev was also known as a composer, writing several film soundtracks and songs. In addition, Magomayev acted in films and hosted television and radio broadcasts devoted to prominent musicians of the 20th century.

Magomayev was an influence on many important Soviet musical figures, including Alla Pugacheva, who often spoke fondly of him.

== Personal life ==
Magomayev married when he was 19, to Ofelia Veliyeva, but the union did not last a year. He eventually remarried, this time to the opera singer Tamara Sinyavskaya.

In later life, Magomayev struggled with a serious heart condition.

== Later years ==
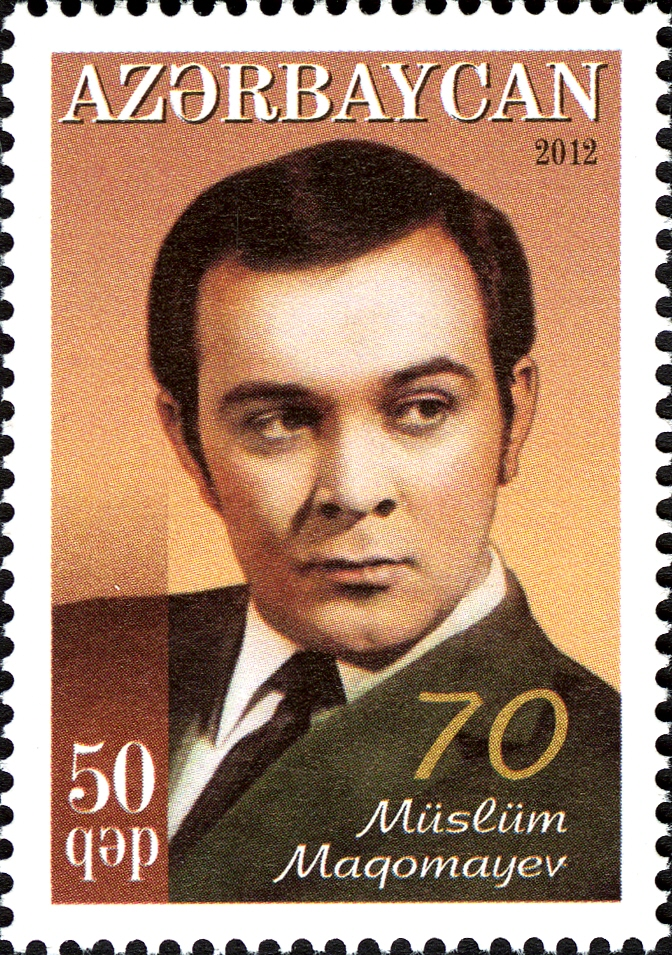
Magomayev on a postage stamp of Azerbaijan

In the early 2000s, Magomayev officially stopped his musical career and gave only a few performances, together with his wife. He died on 25 October 2008 in his flat in Moscow from a heart attack. He was buried in the Alley of Honor in his native city of Baku, next to his grandfather, on 29 October. The funeral ceremony was attended by Azerbaijani President Ilham Aliyev, Magomayev's widow Tamara Sinyavskaya, his daughter Marina, as well as state officials and international delegations. Thousands of people came to pay a final tribute to the singer.

== Honors and awards ==
Orders

- Istiglal Order (Azerbaijan, 2002)
- Shohrat Order (Azerbaijan, 1997)
- Order of Honour (Russia, 2002)
- Order of the Red Banner of Labour (USSR, 1971)
- Order of Friendship of Peoples (USSR, 1980)

Titles

- People's Artist of the USSR (1973)
- People's Artiste of the Azerbaijan SSR (1964)
- Honoured Artist of Azerbaijan SSR (1971)
- Honoured Artist of Chechen-Ingush ASSR

Awards

- Miner's Glory Medal 3rd degree
- Badge «For services to the Polish culture»

In 1997, a minor planet of the Solar System, 4980 Magomaev, was named in his honor.

== Popular songs ==
- "Azerbaijan" ("Azərbaycan")
- "Blagodaryu tebya" ("Благодарю тебя") – Grateful to You
- "Chyortovo koleso" ("Чёртово колесо") – Ferris wheel
- "Golubaya tayga" ("Голубая тайга") – Blue Taiga
- "Koroleva krasoty" ("Королева красоты") – The Queen of the Beauty
- "Luch solntsa zolotovo" ("Луч солнца золотого") – Sunbeam of the Golden Sun
- "Luchshy gorod Zemli" ("Лучший город Земли") – The Best City on Earth
- "Melodia" ("Мелодия") – Melody
- "Nam ne zhit drug bez druga" ("Нам не жить друг без друга") – We Can't Live Without One Another
- "Ne speshi" ("Не спеши") – Don't Rush
- "Noktyurn" ("Ноктюрн") – Nocturne
- "Serdtse na snegu" ("Сердце на снегу") – Heart on the Snow
- "Solntsem opyanyonnyy" ("Солнцем опьянённый") – Intoxicated by the Sun
- "Sinyaya vechnost" ("Синяя вечность") – Blue Eternity
- "Svadba" ("Свадьба") – Wedding
- "Vdol po Piterskoy" ("Вдоль по Питерской") – Down the Peterskaya Road
- "Verni mne muziku" (""Верни мне музыку") – Return the Music to Me

== See also ==
- Monument to Muslim Magomayev
- Muslim Magomayev Azerbaijani State Musical Drama Theatre, Derbent
