= Maarjamäe =

Subdistrict of Tallinn, Estonia

Coordinates: 59.456°N 24.830°E

- Subdistrict of Tallinn
- Interactive map of Maarjamäe
- Country: Estonia
- County: Harju County
- City: Tallinn
- District: Pirita

Area
  - Total: 155 ha (380 acres)

Population (1 January 2022)
  - Total: 2,412
  - Density: 1,560/km^{2} (4,030/sq mi)

Maarjamäe (Estonian for 'Maria's Hill') is a subdistrict (Estonian: asum) in the district of Pirita, Tallinn, the capital of Estonia. It is bordered by Pirita and Kose to the north, Lasnamäe to the south, Kadriorg to the southwest and the Bay of Tallinn to the west. As of 2022, it has a population of 2,412.

Maarjamäe's known history dates back to 1689, with the area back then known as Ristimäe/Streitberg. The end of the 17th century saw the construction of a summer manor, with the area becoming a popular resort for the burghers. The construction of a sugar factory in 1811 saw the area become known as Suhkrumäe, with its current name only coming into existence in 1873. Suburbia construction ensued in the 1940s and 1950s, transforming the area into its modern form.

== Etymology ==
The earliest known name for the area is the German Streitberg/Strietberg ('strife hill'), referencing an alleged Livonian War battle between the Brotherhood of Blackheads and besieging Russians. An Estonian version of this name is Ristimäe or Riiumägi ('cross hill', 'strife hill').

A colloquial name for the area, Suhkrumäe ('sugar hill') emerged in the 19th century with the construction of a sugar factory by Johan Gottlieb Clementz.

The current name emerged from the German Marienberg, most likely named by Count Anatoly Orlov-Davydov in honour of his wife or daughter, Maria. An alternative theory suggests the source as the historical, disused name for Pirita, Marienthal, Vallis Mariae. Estonianization in the 1930s brought about the modern name Maarjamäe.

== History ==
The first known location in the area was an inn (Ristimeh Krog), marked on a 1689 map. Ratsherr and Brotherhood of Blackheads member Christian von Geldern founded a summer manor overlooking the sea at the end of the 17th century. With the city falling into Russian hands, a naval battery was constructed on sea "in front" of the manor in 1715.

The burgher Johan Gottlieb Clementz obtained a plot of land and led the construction of a sugar factory on the site in 1811. By the 1820s the site included several stone buildings, a wooden residential building, sheds, a forge, a lime burning stove, an ice cellar and a water distribution system for the factory. The plot was surrounded by a four-metre stone wall. Several stone buildings, the ice cellar and parts of the wall survive to this day.

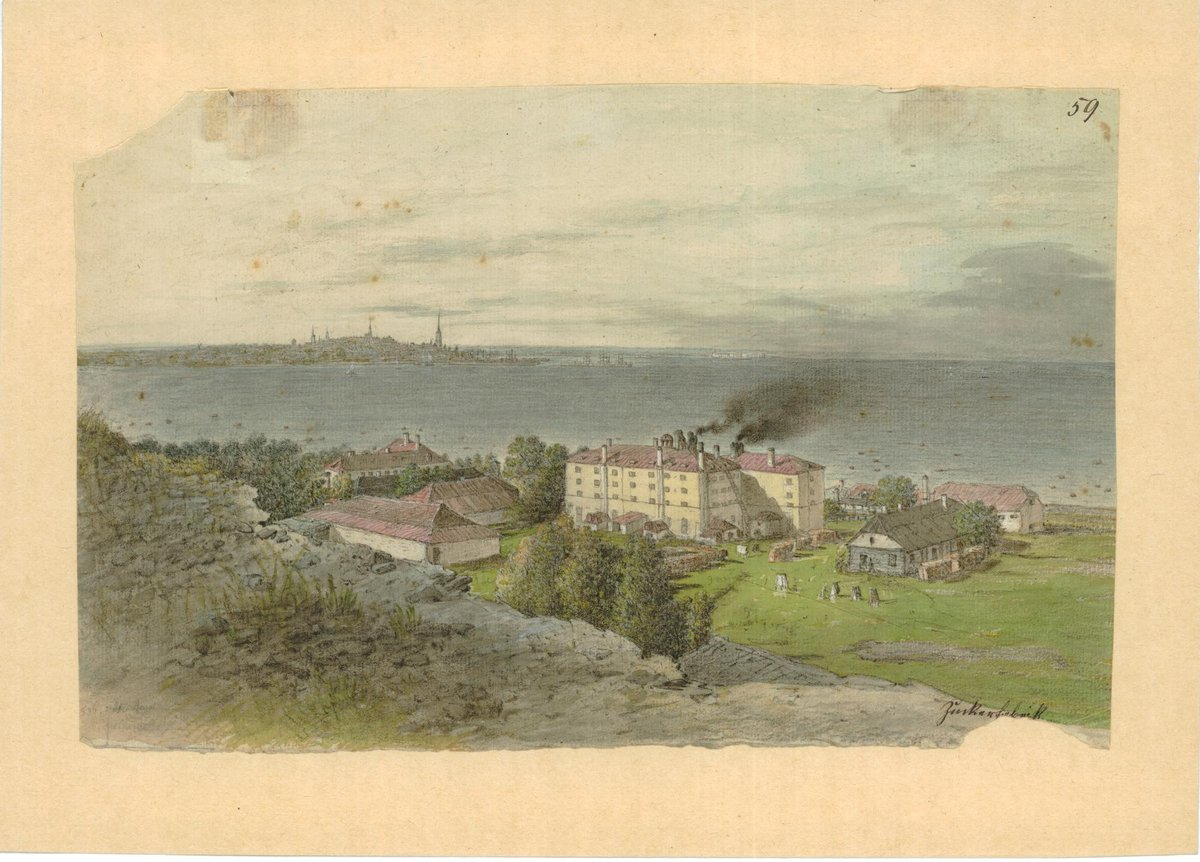
The sugar factory as depicted in the 1830s

Christian Abraham Rotermann purchased the factory in 1861, converting the site to produce starch and spirits. Rotermann also constructed Tallinn's first steam mill at Suhkrumäe. However, industrial production was ended for good in 1869 with the factory destroyed in a fire.

The 1870s brought about change with the area becoming a popular resort. Count Anatoly Orlov-Davydov purchased the manor in 1873 and renamed the area in honour of his wife, Maria Egorovna Tolstaya (1841-1895). Designed by Robert Gödicke, 'Orlov's castle' was finished by 1874 and used mainly by the count's family. Summer houses were constructed near the castle, in today's administrative Maarjamäe. Larger plans to construct a garden city stretching from Lillepi were not realised.

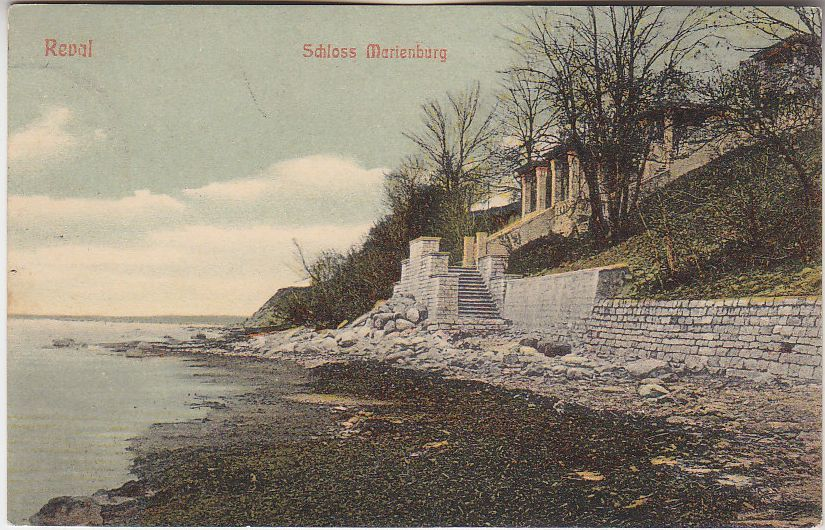
The castle's seaside stairwell on a postcard

The turn of the century brought about social changes. The newly-exiled count rented out the castle for social events. In 1933, the most prestigious restaurant-hotel of the city was opened in the castle. However, in 1937 the castle was purchased by the state with the Air Defence Aviation Academy moving in. Following Soviet occupation, the castle was shortly used by the Soviet army, later converted into tiny flats and left to dilapidate.

Some imperial-era resort homes remain in Maarjamäe today, but the vast majority of the district was constructed after the war. Estonia stood out in the USSR with construction of private houses allowed in urban areas, though still strictly regulated with building series. Architectural control was, however, less strict and unlike other buildings from the Stalinist era, German influence is strongly visible; the area is a stand-out example of the era's architecture. Expansion of the suburbia continued through the following decades.

Between the castle and suburbia lies a cemetery and a memorial complex. Both Soviet and German troops were buried at Maarjamäe, including Bolshevik rebel sailors executed in 1919 on Naissaar and Estonian volunteers in German uniform. An obelisk was erected in 1960 commemorating the Ice Cruise of the Baltic Fleet; a larger memorial complex commemorating "those fallen fighting for Soviet rule" was opened in 1975. A new, Estonian memorial commemorating the victims of communism between 1940 and 1991 was built next to the German cemetery and Soviet memorial.

In 1980, construction of a base of the Tallinn Higher Military-Political Construction School began. The site was taken over by the newly-founded Estonian Academy of Security Sciences.

Suburban expansion continued in the 21st century, with new private homes, terraced housing and apartment complexes. The castle was renovated in the 1980s by Polish company PKZ Wroclav. In 2018, the castle was re-opened as a history museum, also hosting the Estonian Film Museum.

== Demographics ==
The population of Maarjamäe in 2022 was 2412, virtually unchanged from 2021. Covering 155 hectares, the neighbourhood has a suburban population density of 1556 inhabitants per km^{2}. The population is 66% Estonian and 21% Russian, with the rest unknown at subdistrict level.

The average gross income in 2021 was 1979€, 134.3% of the national average.

== Points of interest ==
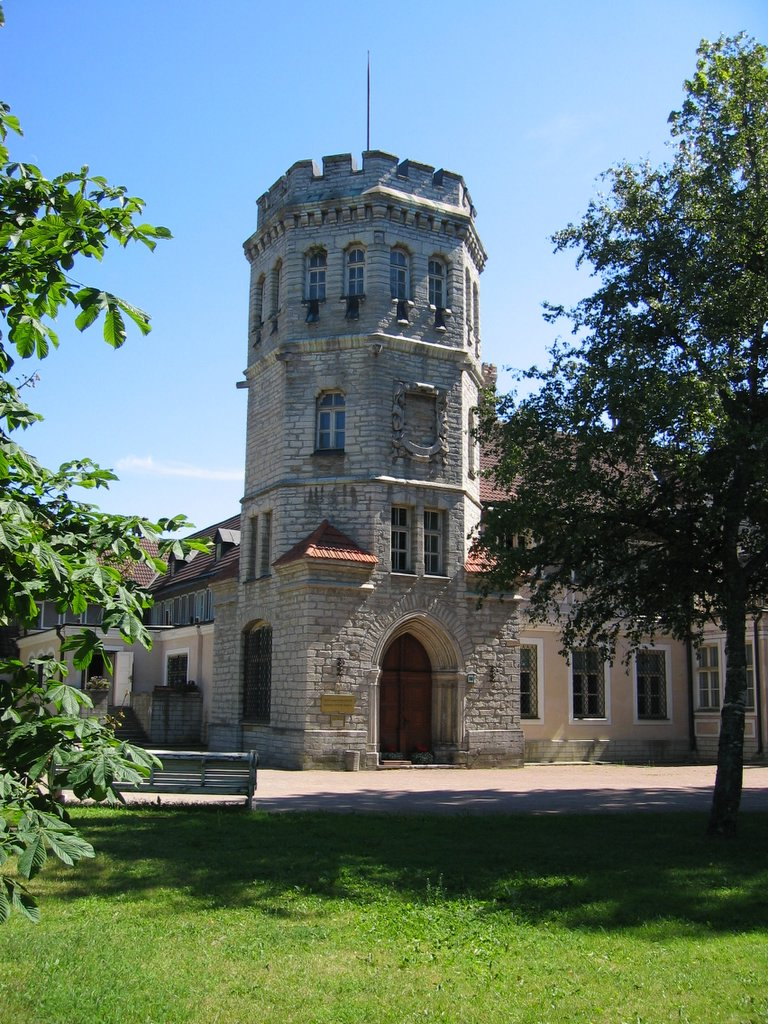
Maarjamäe Palace

Maarjamäe is most well known for its palace and memorial complex, but neither of these actually lie within the subdistrict administratively.

=== Landmarks and museums ===
Maarjamäe Palace is the namesake of the district and has been a part of the Estonian History Museum since 1975, hosting the Estonian SSR's History and Revolution Museum since 1987 (renamed to its current form in 1989). The complex has been renovated several times since re-independence. Today, the former courtyard hosts the museum park, including a permanent exhibition of removed Soviet-era monuments. In 2017, new buildings were added to the manor park, hosting the Estonian Film Museum, introducing the art of filmmaking and the history of Estonian cinema.

The Maarjamäe memorial complex was opened in 1975 to commemorate "those who fought for Soviet rule". A part of the complex is the formerly opened obelisk to the Ice Cruise and a German military cemetery. After independence, an agreement was reached to respect the burial sanctity of all sides (in light of former violations) and today the site has memorial plaques in Estonian, German and Russian. In spite of its original purpose, the site survived post-independence decommunisation, but its future is still under question and intense debate.

In 2018, a new memorial was opened commemorating the victims of communism. The memorial lists over 22 000 names of those who died by the hand of the communist regime. The memorial includes a walled corridor, with the aforementioned names on plaques, and a park symbolising one's home garden. The site hosts memorial events on various national holidays, most notably on memorial days of Soviet deportations.

By the coast there are two monuments. The first one, opened in 1989, commemorates American parachutist Charles Leroux, who was killed in Tallinn after a failed jump. Alongside it is a monument to rally co-driver Michael Park, wingman to Markko Märtin, killed in an accident in 2005. Both monuments commemorate "courageous and committed people".

=== Parks and sport ===
Maarjamäe has two parks, Windecki and Lillepi. The southern border of the district is formed by the 20–30-metre tall Maarjamäe cliff separating Pirita and Lasnamäe, along the bottom of the cliff runs the Maarjamäe forest. The forest also includes a disc golf range. Within the residential area lie two playgrounds, a football field, two basketball courts, two volleyball courts, and an open-door gym. The Varsaallika stream flows along the northern and eastern borders of the subdistrict, an important element of Lillepi Park.

Windeck Park was founded in the 1870s along with the castle and resort homes. A summer manor was constructed overlooking the sea and a park surrounding it. The destruction of the manor in a fire in 1996 however spelled the end for the park. Privatisation of the land brought private mansions and destruction of valuable trees and vegetation. The destruction of the historical park and a lack of public space or anything worth protecting led to the park losing nature protection in 2020.

Lillepi park is named after a 17th century farm and lies on former pastures. Various historic development plans notwithstanding, most of the park is natural forest and encompasses around a fifth of the entire subdistrict. 75 plant and 90 bird species have been noted to inhabit the park. It is circled by a health trail for cyclists and rollerbladers and includes a playground.

Maarjamäe's football ground was constructed in 1965 as the stadium for the Norma production association and was their home ground until 1995, when the club dissolved. The stadium was obtained by FC Levadia in 2006 and was re-opened in 2007 after large scale renovation works. It is currently used for the club's youth training. Plans to build a covered football hall were derailed after questions were raised about its effect on the sanctity of the newly built memorial (located right next to it) and were scrapped in a deal with the city and national government.

=== Institutions ===
Maarjamäe hosts the Estonian Academy of Security Sciences, with its Soviet predecessor constructing their facilities there in 1980. The academy received a new main building in 2019. The site also includes a parade ground, sporting centre, dorms, and a replica of the Estonian-Russian border fence.

The Pähkli residences of Tallinn Children's Home are situated on Pähkli street.

== Transport ==
=== Roads and pathways ===
Maarjamäe's residential area is serviced by Kose tee, running from the seaside along the suburbia heading towards Kose. Along the coastline, Pirita tee connects all of Pirita to Viimsi and the city centre.

Pirita tee includes a cycleway and walkway. Two light traffic paths head up the cliff to Lasnamäe, one from the memorial to Mäe street and one from Kase street to Katleri.

=== Public transport ===
City bus routes servicing Maarjamäe

Maarjamäe is directly serviced by two TLT AS bus lines running along Kose tee, both terminating in the adjacent district of Kose at Metsakooli tee.

- 5 Metsakooli tee – Viru – Männiku
- 6 Metsakooli tee – Merivälja pansion

The stops servicing Pirita tee combine to six city bus lines connecting suburbs of Pirita and Viimsi to the rest of the city, a night line connecting Viimsi to the city and four regional bus lines connecting to Viimsi and Muuga.

- 1 Viimsi – Viru – Vana-Pääsküla
- 8 Äigrumäe – Balti jaam – Väike-Õismäe
- 8A Äigrumäe - Viru keskus
- 34 Muuga aedlinn – Viru keskus
- 38 Muuga – Viru keskus
- 49 Viimsi keskus - Lennujaam (airport)
- 95 Viimsi keskus - Balti jaam (central train station) (night line)
- 114 Tallinn – Haabneeme – Rohuneeme
- 115 Tallinn – Mähe – Randvere – Tammneeme
- 173 Tallinn – Muuga aedlinn – Maardu
- 174 Tallinn – Viimsi – Haabneeme
