= Tallinn Card =

Admission ticket for tourists in Tallinn

The Tallinn Card is a time-limited ticket available to visitors to Tallinn, Estonia. It allows the holder free use of the public transport system, free entry to many museums and other places of interest, and discounts or free gifts from shops or restaurants. The card is issued by the Tallinn City Tourist Office & Convention Bureau.

== History ==
The Tallinn Card was launched in 1998.

== Card types ==
The Tallinn Card is available in two types: Tallinn Card and Tallinn Card PLUS (which includes free City Tour hop on hop off buses). It is possible to choose a suitable duration for the card – 24 hours, 48 hours, or 72 hours. Children aged 17 or under benefit from a reduced price.

== Public transport ==
The cardholder can use the city trams and trolleybuses at no charge. Buses numbered 1 to 68 can also be used at no charge.

== Museums and attractions ==
The cardholder has free access to over 40 museums and attractions across the city, including the KUMU Art Museum, Maarjamäe Palace – Estonian History Museum, the Natural History Museum, the Estonian Open Air Museum, and others. In addition, it grants a possibility to climb the towers of the Old Town and some churches like St Olaf's church.

== Other benefits ==
Some restaurants and shops offer either a discount or a free gift to the cardholder.

== Purchasing a Tallinn Card ==
These can be bought from a wide range of places including the airport, most hotels, and the Tourist Information Centre in the city. It is also possible to buy the Tallinn Card from their online shop.
