= Charles Leroux =

American balloonist and parachutist (1856–1889)

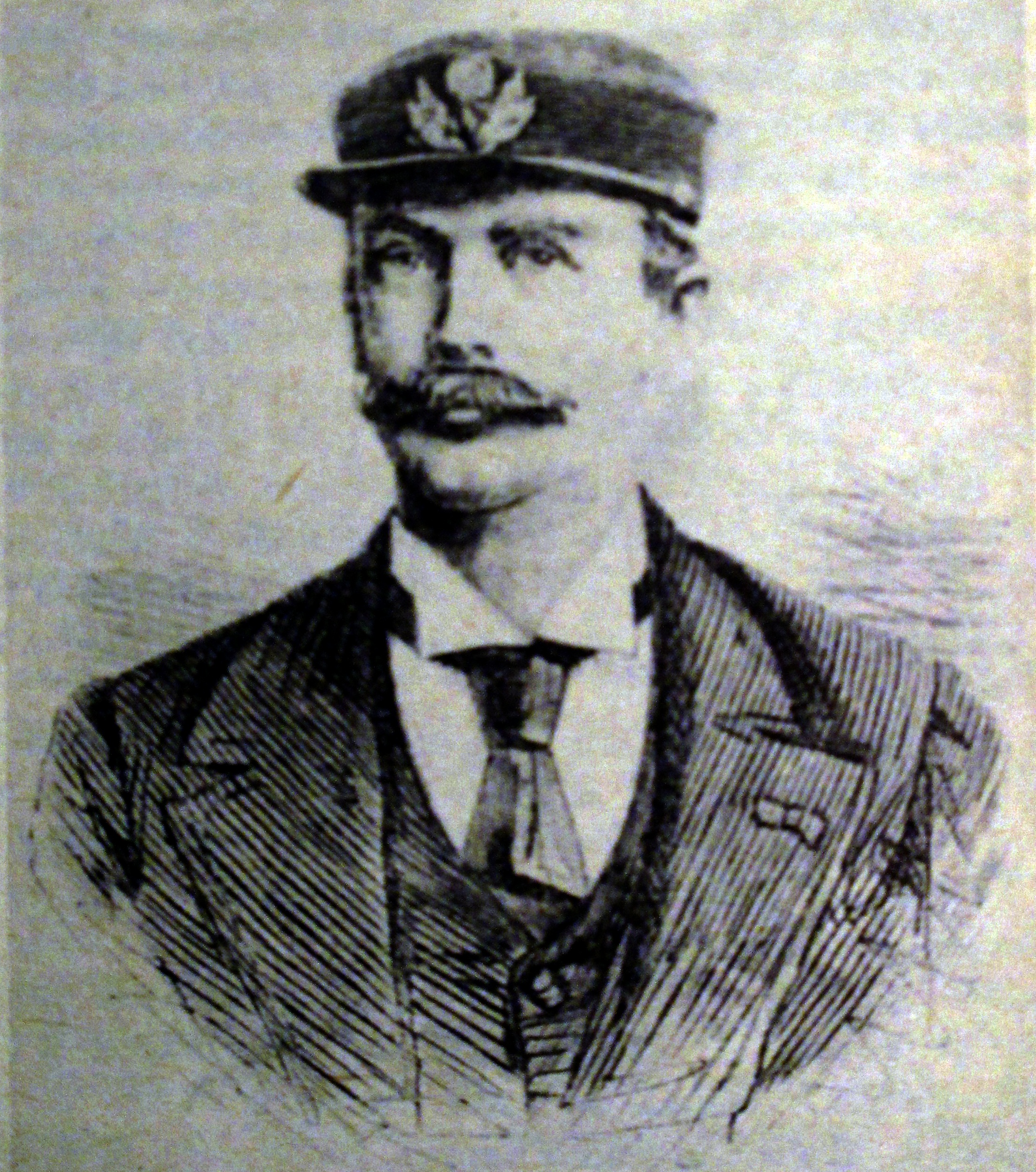
Charles Leroux (1889)

Charles Leroux (born as Joseph Johnson; 31 October 1856 in Waterbury, Connecticut, United States – 24 September 1889 in Tallinn, Estonia, then Russian Empire) was an American balloonist and parachutist.

He died on his 239th jump after a water landing in the Tallinn Bay. One hundred years later, in 1989, a commemorative monument to Leroux was opened near his site of death in the Pirita district of Tallinn, capital of Estonia.

== Biography ==
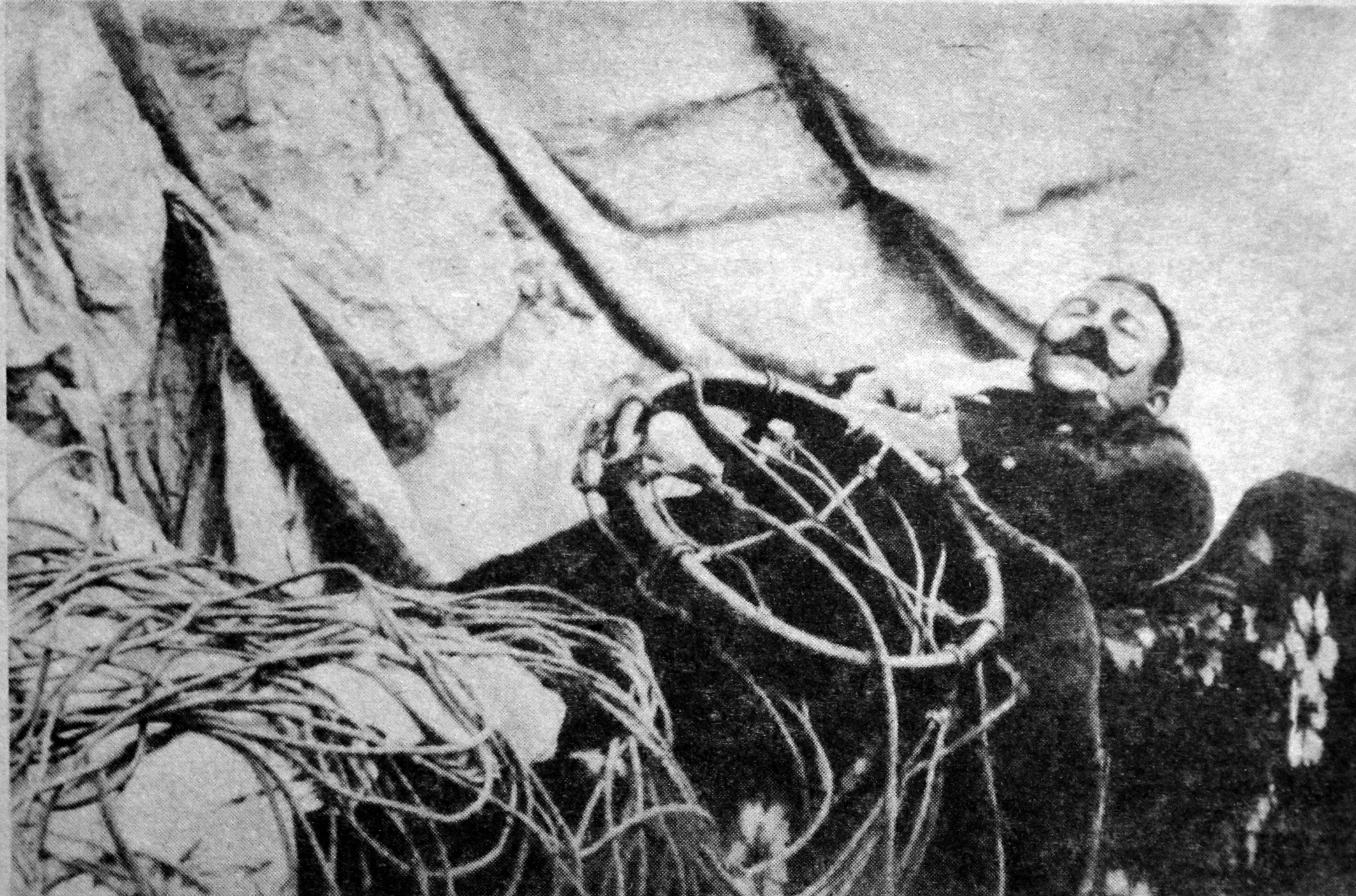
Deceased Leroux and his parachute

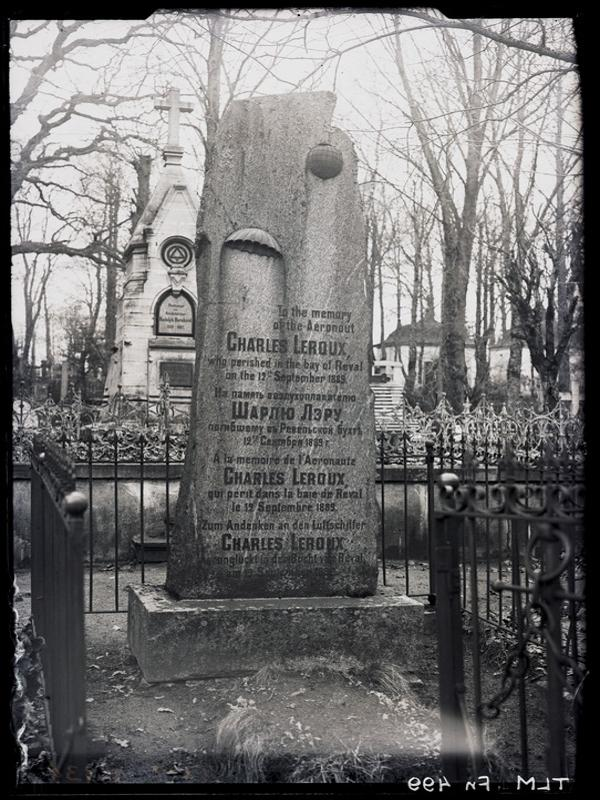
Leroux's tomb in Kopli cemetery (photographed in 1900, destroyed in 1950)

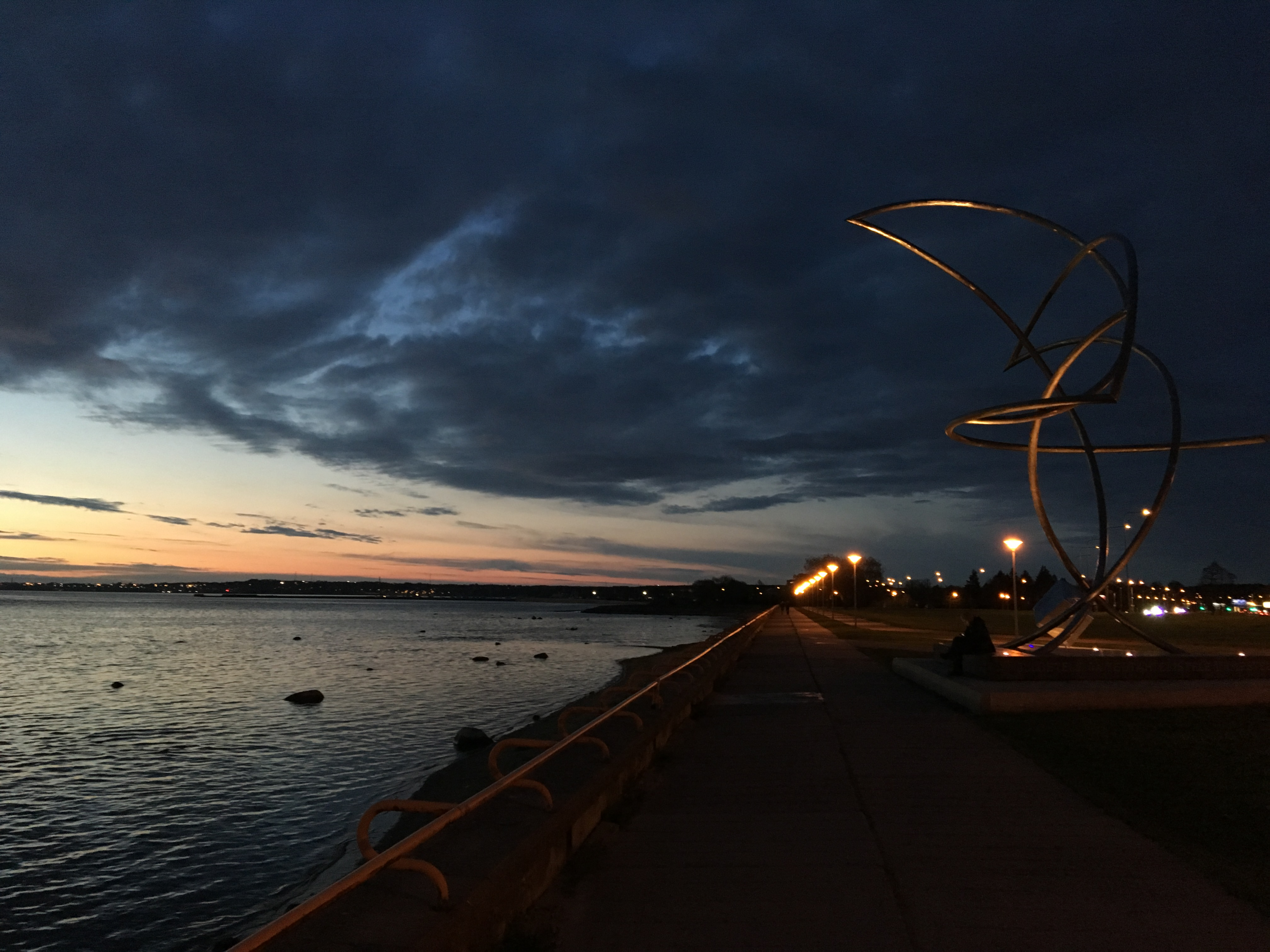
Monument to Leroux near his site of death by the Tallinn Bay

Charles Leroux was born in the town of Waterbury, Connecticut. He came to Europe in 1889 in order to demonstrate his skill in flying balloons and parachuting from them. He is known to have performed exhibition jumps in Germany (Berlin and Bremen) and Russia (Moscow, Saint Petersburg). He was to conclude his European tour in Tallinn.

Leroux's parachute jump in Tallinn, initially scheduled for 22 September 1889 was postponed for two days on account of high winds. On 24 September (12 September o.s.), however, the weather showed little improvement. Variable winds were accompanied with fine rain every now and then. After an angry argument with his manager, Leroux decided to go up.

The balloon was inflated with lighting gas supplied by the local gas factory and it took off at 5 PM from a small elevation at a former bastion of Harjumägi in the city centre. Winds overpowered the balloon at once and quickly drove it towards the Tallinn Bay. Above the last houses of the town the balloonist dropped himself down from the suspended seat and began to descend under a properly inflated canopy. The winds, however, rocked the parachute violently and carried it farther out to sea. About 1.24 miles (2 km) off the coast the heavily oscillating parachute dropped into the sea. Leroux made no attempt to unharness himself from the parachute and quickly disappeared under water. Some observers later said that they thought they saw him rise to the surface on one or two occasions. No safety precautions had been taken, and the lifeboats that reached the area ten minutes later found no trace of the balloonist. Two days passed before Leroux's body was recovered by local people. A medical commission came to the conclusion that he had drowned.

Charles Leroux was an inventor at heart, independently making numerous improvements to his balloon and parachute. His performance and death in Tallinn captured widespread public attention in Estonia and inspired many young men to pursue careers in aviation. Leroux is celebrated for his contributions to aeronautics, and in Estonia, preserving his memory is regarded as a matter of honor.

Leroux was buried at the Kopli cemetery in Tallinn. However, the site of his grave is now unknown, as the entire cemetery was flattened and all graves destroyed in 1950, during the Soviet occupation of Estonia.
