= Great Guild, Tallinn =

Historical building in Tallinn, Estonia

Coordinates: 59°26′17″N 24°44′42″E

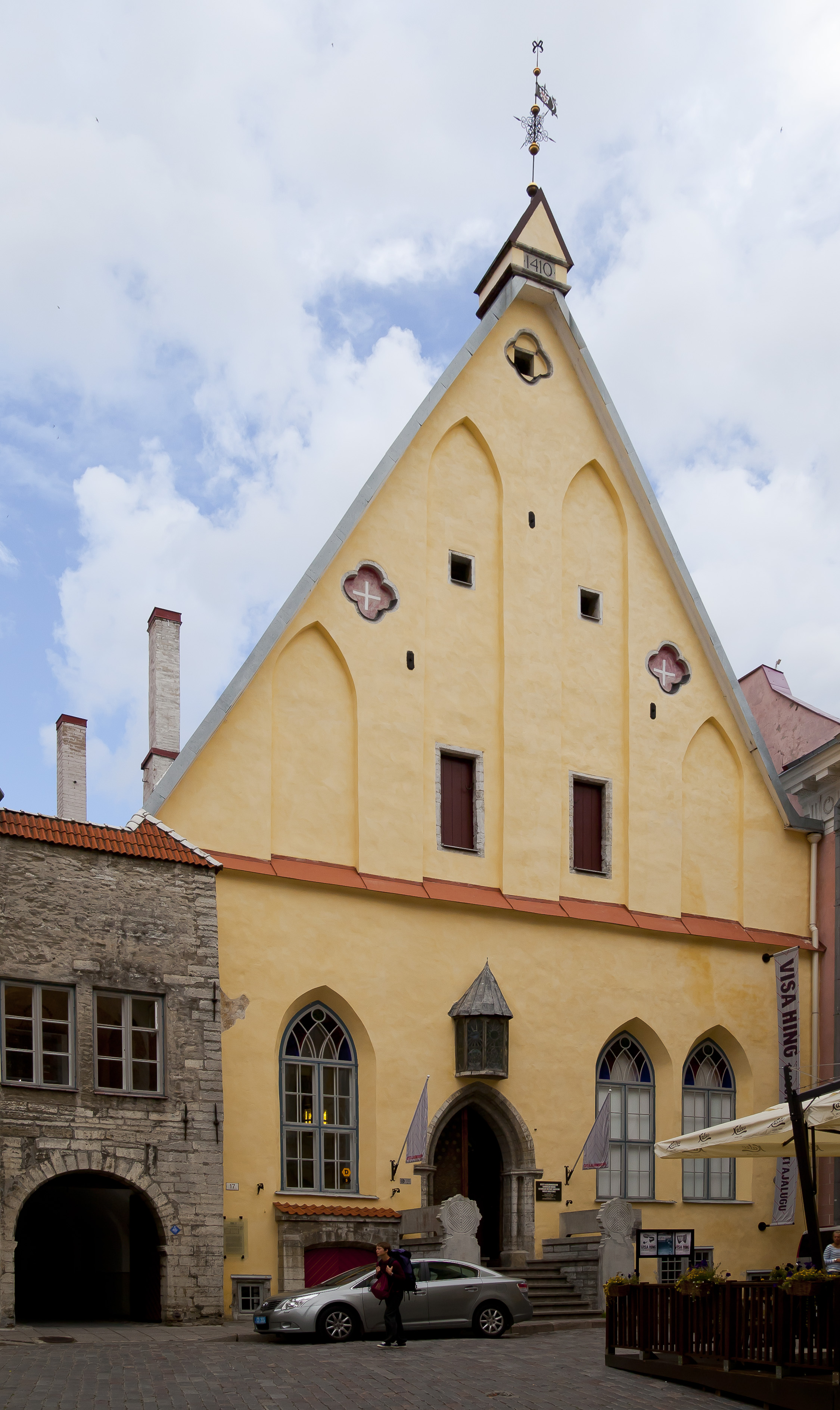
The Great Guildhall, Tallinn

The Great Guild (Estonian: Suurgild, German: Große Gilde) was a guild for merchants and artisans, operating in Tallinn from at least the 14th century until 1920. It was based in the Great Guild hall, a Gothic building in the historical centre of Tallinn, today housing the Estonian History Museum. In 2013, the Great Guild hall was named a European Heritage site.

The building was erected in 1407–1410, with the interiors finished in 1417. The façade is decorated with blind arches, and has a typical, prominent portal. Inside, the main hall especially retains the medieval atmosphere. It is a large (365 square metres (3,930 sq ft)) room, supported by a range of pillars with decoratively carved capitals.

The Great Guildhall is considered a typical example of medieval Tallinn architecture.
