= Soviet-era statues =

Aspect of art in the Soviet Union

Soviet-era statues are statuary art that figured prominently in the art of the Soviet Union. Typically made in the style of Socialist Realism, they frequently depicted significant state and party leaders, such as Joseph Stalin and Vladimir Lenin.

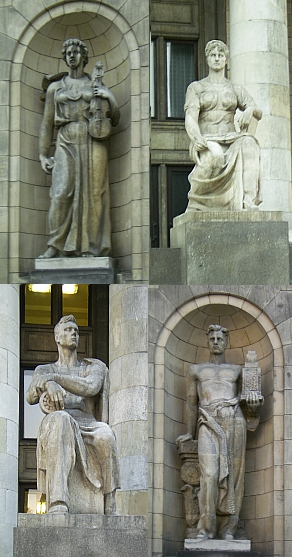
Socialist-realist allegories surrounding the Palace of Culture and Science, Poland.

The construction of large monumental statues was a key part of Lenin's strategy of "Monumental propaganda" which proposed the use visual art to propagate revolutionary ideas. Such symbolism included other statues that were portrayals of realist allegorical figures in motion, figuratively striding forward into the new Soviet age, as well as Soviet role models, such as Nurkhon Yuldasheva.

Statues of prominent socialist figures - particularly of Lenin - were mass-produced and installed in villages, towns and cities across the Soviet Union. After World War Two, the socialist states of the Eastern Bloc similarly produced a large number of statues.

== Removal of Soviet monuments ==
=== De-Stalinization ===
After the death of Joseph Stalin in 1953, his successor Nikita Khrushchev began to relax the repressive policies of Stalin's government in a period known as the Khrushchev Thaw. This culminated in Khrushchev's 1956 Secret Speech denouncing Stalinism. Statues that represented Stalin's cult of personality were subsequently removed from most public spaces in the Soviet Union and its satellite states as part of a process of "De-Stalinization".

The only statue of Stalin in Budapest, Hungary, was destroyed by citizens during the 1956 Hungarian Revolution; no replacement was ever made.

=== Post-Soviet developments ===
Since the Revolutions of 1989 and the dissolution of the Soviet Union in 1991, Soviet-era statues and monuments have been removed from many public spaces being either destroyed, moved to less prominent locations, or in some cases sold to private collectors. Soviet-era statues have become the subject of debate over the legacy of the Communist era in much of the former Eastern Bloc, and in some countries they have even been outlawed under Decommunization laws.

Many prominent statues in the Eastern Bloc countries were removed in the immediate aftermath of the collapse of their socialist governments. Notable examples include the Monument to Felix Dzerzhinsky in Moscow, and the Lenin Monument in East Berlin.

A statue of Lenin which was installed in Poprad, Czechoslovakia shortly before the Velvet Revolution was purchased by Lewis E. Carpenter, an American English teacher working in Poprad. In 1993 the statue was shipped to Seattle, Washington in the United States where it stands to this day.

A separate Lenin statue also stands in New York City: the East Village Lenin Statue. Unlike Seattle's, this statue was not purchased, but was found discarded in Moscow by real estate developers Michael Shaoul and Michael Rosen, who then salvaged, shipped, and installed the 18-foot Lenin statue in New York in 1994.

Several "Sculpture Parks" have been established in post-Soviet states to display Communist-era statues in a museum environment:

- There is a display of Soviet statues in Grutas Park (promoted to tourists as "Stalin World") near Druskininkai in Lithuania.
- The open-air Muzeon Park of Arts in Moscow, Russia has over 600 Soviet-era statues.
- The Museum of Socialist Art in Bulgaria includes a statue park.
- The Statue Park Museum in Memento Park in Budapest, Hungary displays sculptures from the Communist era between 1945 and 1989.
- The Estonian History Museum at the Maarjamäe Palace in Tallinn has an outdoor display of twenty-one large Soviet-era sculptures by Estonian artists.
- A number of Soviet, Nazi and Imperial statues are displayed at the Spandau Citadel in Berlin.

==== Ukraine ====
The Euromaidan protests in Ukraine saw a wave of Soviet-era monuments being destroyed by protesters; a notable example being the Vladimir Lenin monument in Kyiv, the destruction of which by ultranationalists was opposed by the majority of Kyiv's residents. The Statue of Lenin in Kharkiv - the largest statue of Lenin in Ukraine - was also toppled in 2014 by protesters including members of the Azov Battalion.

In 2015 Ukrainian President Petro Poroshenko approved laws that required the removal of all socialist symbolism in public places, with the exception of World War Two memorials. As of 2016, 1,320 Lenin monuments and 1,069 monuments to other socialist figures have been removed, with the last remaining monuments being either within the Chernobyl Exclusion Zone or in areas under Russian occupation.

In August 2023 in the midst of the Russo-Ukrainian War, the Soviet state emblem on the shield of the Mother Ukraine Monument was replaced with the Ukrainian trident emblem.

== Gallery ==
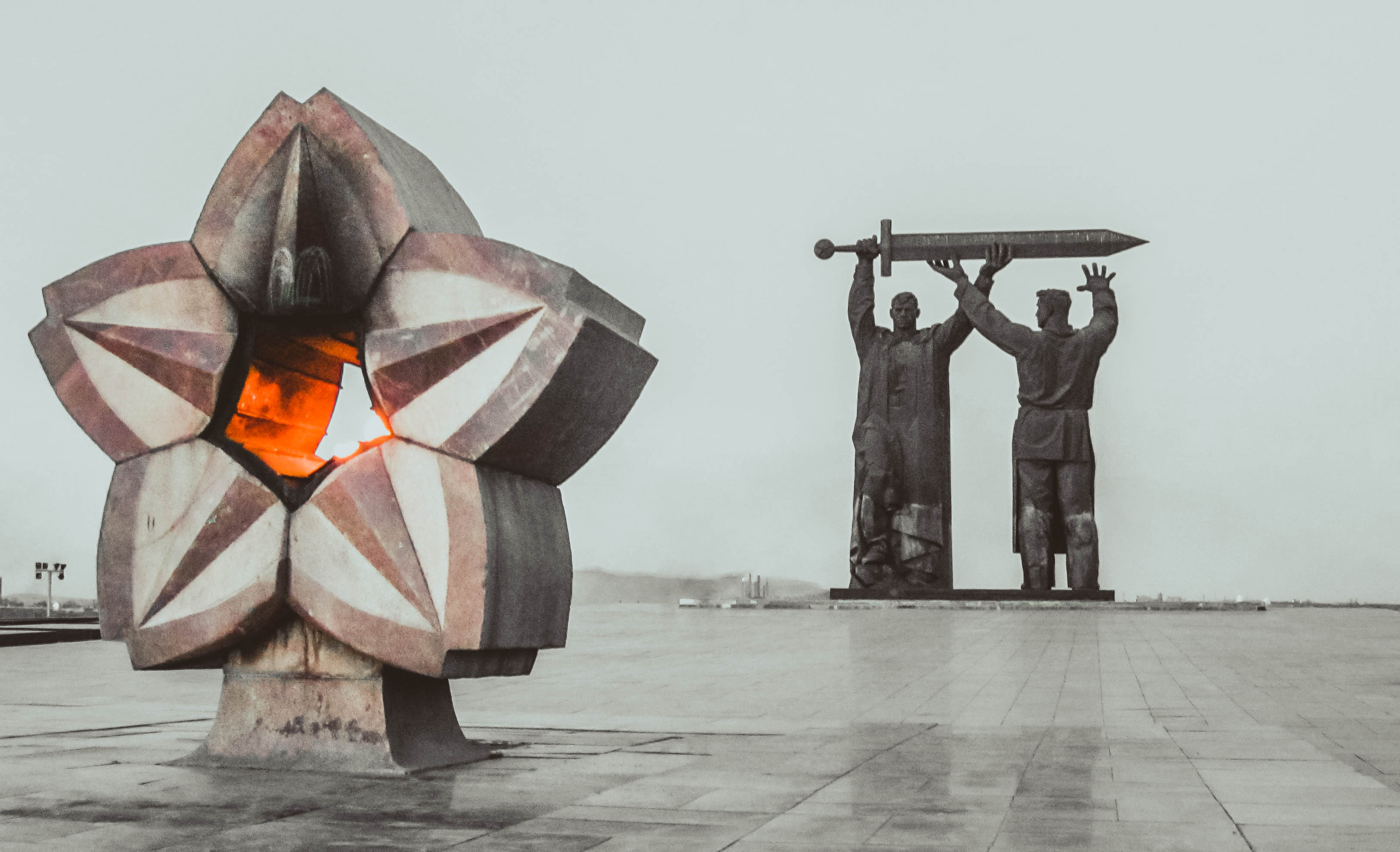
Rear-front Memorial in Magnitogorsk, Russia.

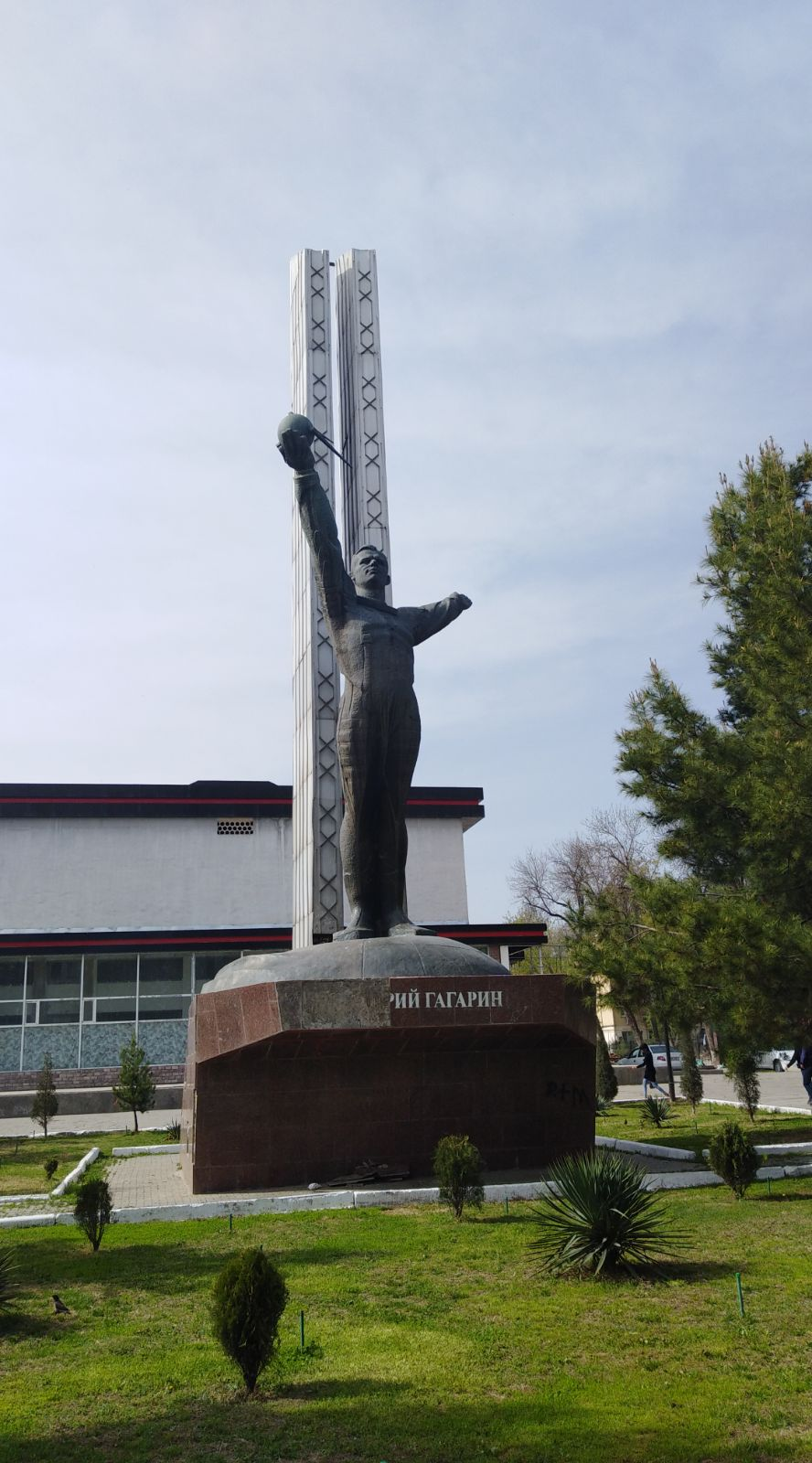
Statue of Yuri Gagarin in Tashkent, Uzbekistan.

A monument to fallen Soviet soldiers in Ivanovka, Ukraine.

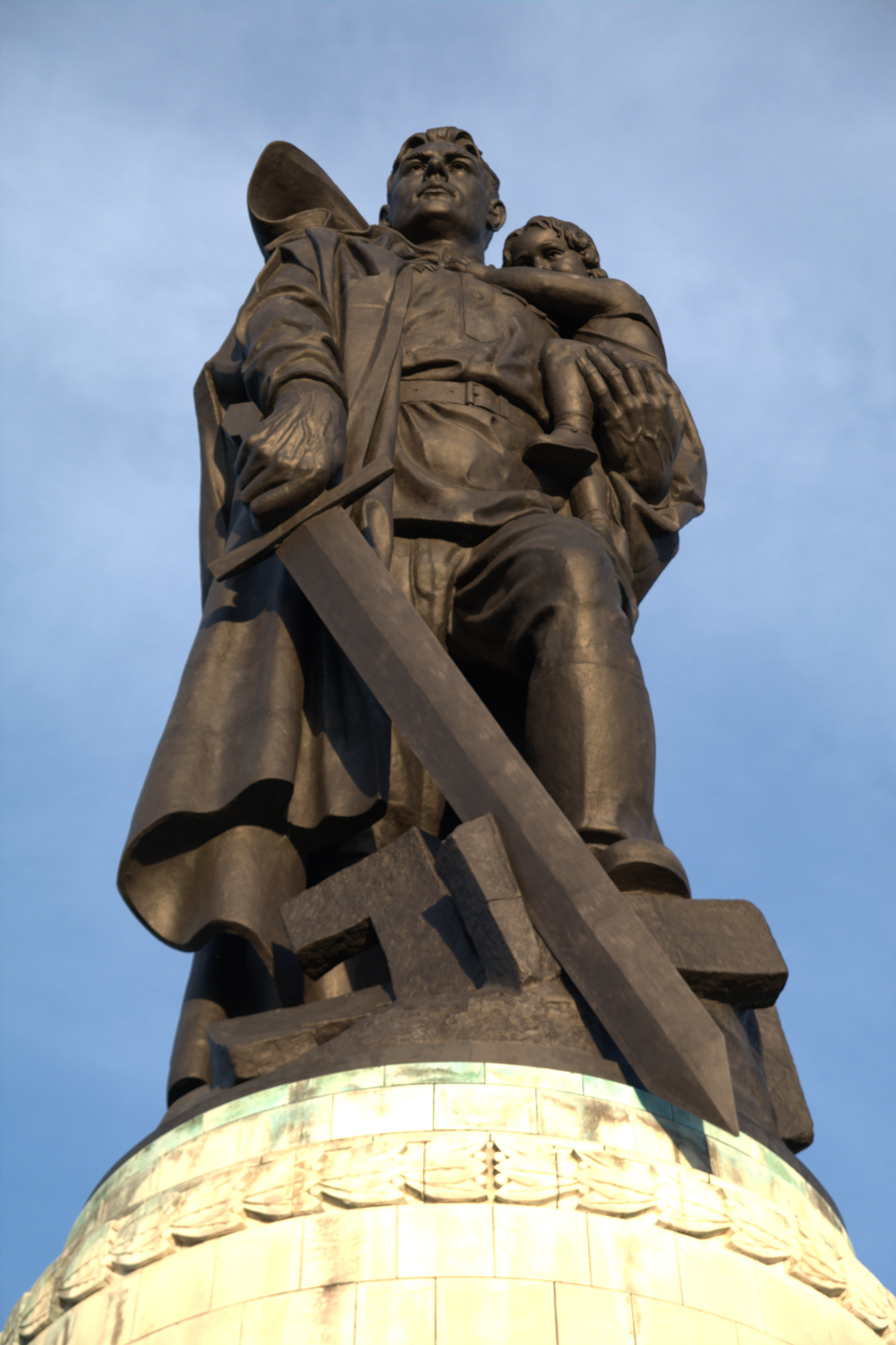
Warrior Liberator statue at the Soviet War Memorial in Treptower Park, Berlin.

Monument to Karl Marx in Moscow, Russia.

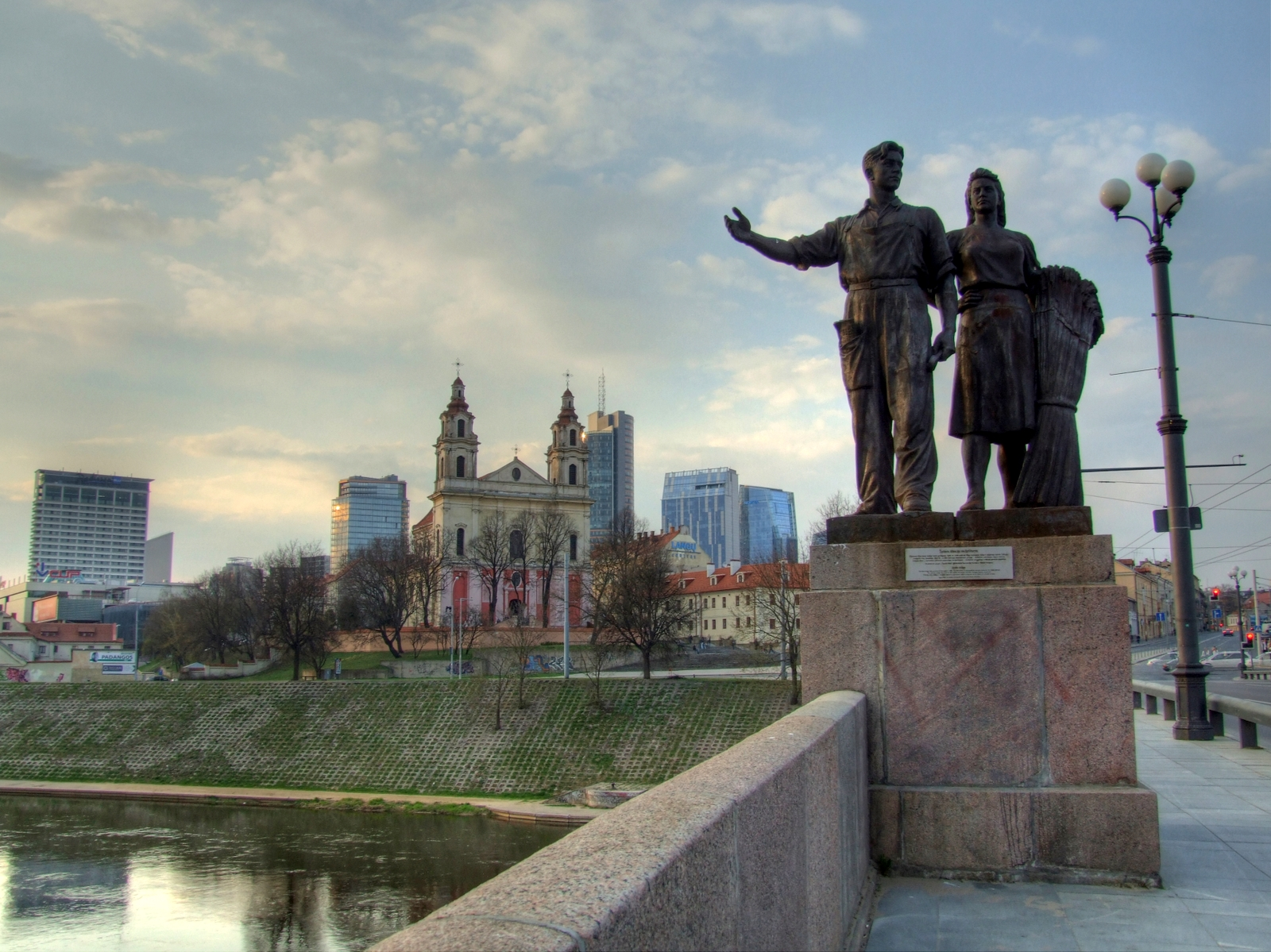
Allegorical depiction of workers on the Green Bridge (Vilnius), removed in 2015.

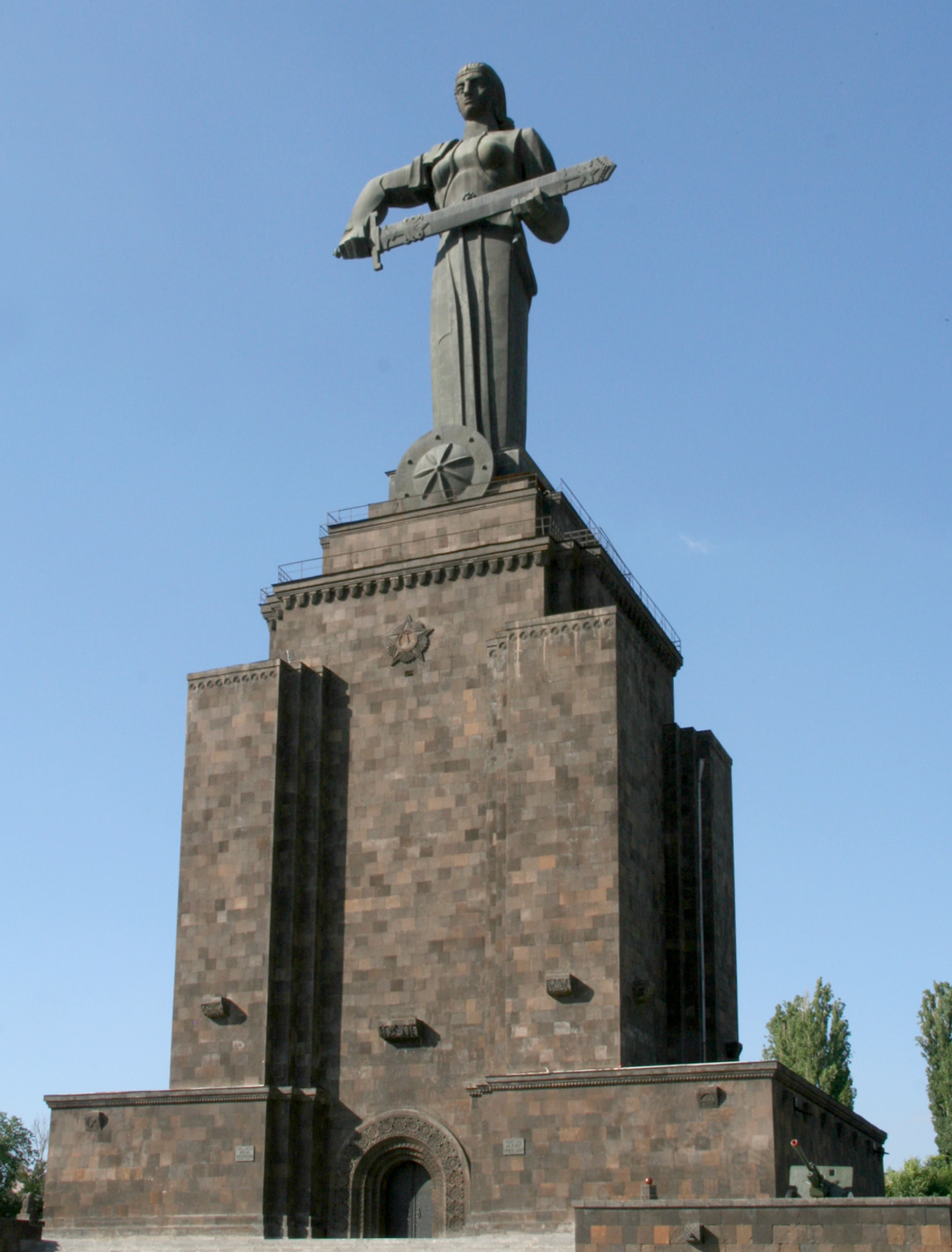
Mother Armenia statue in Yerevan which replaced an earlier statue of Stalin in 1962.

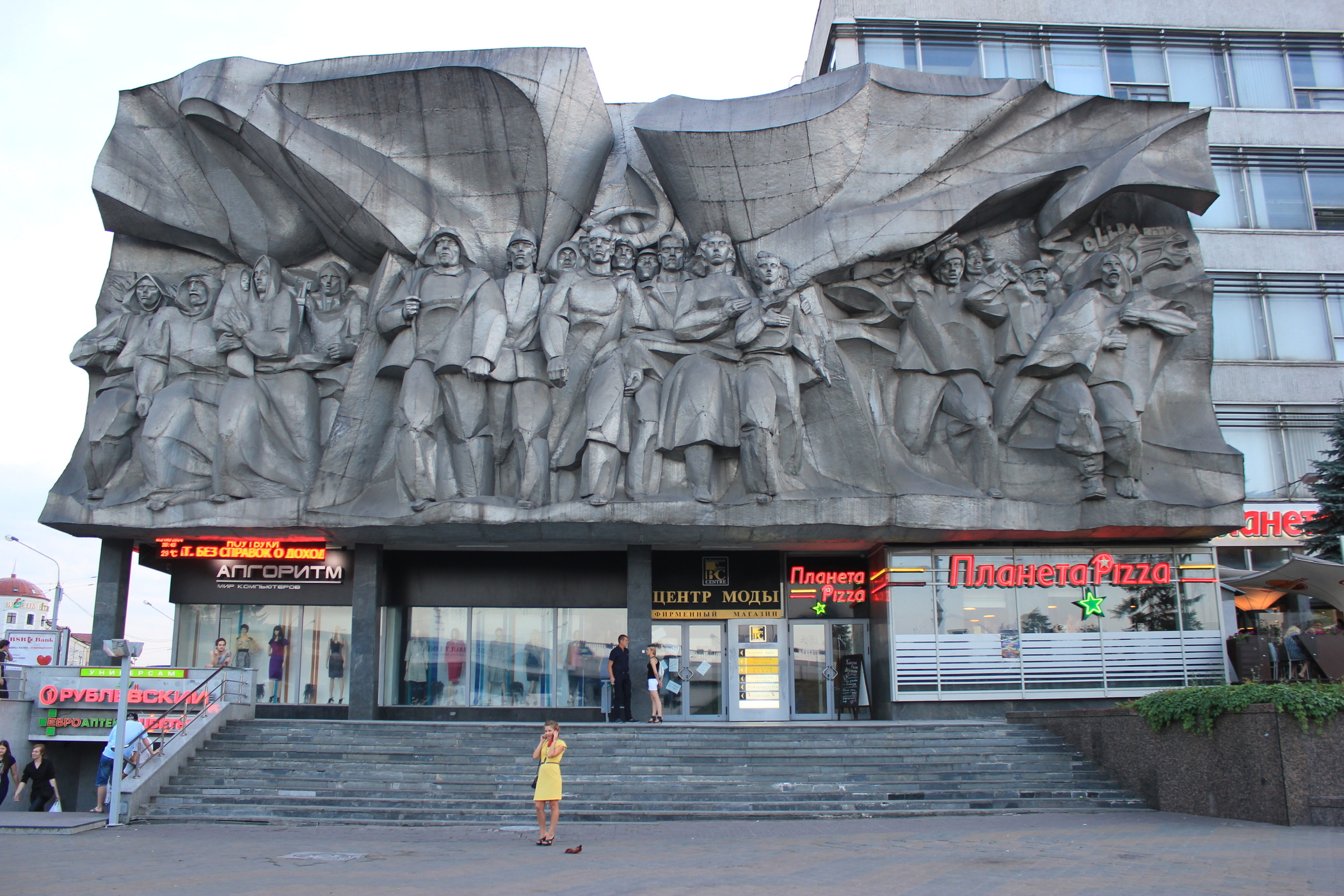
Relief sculpture in Minsk, Belarus.

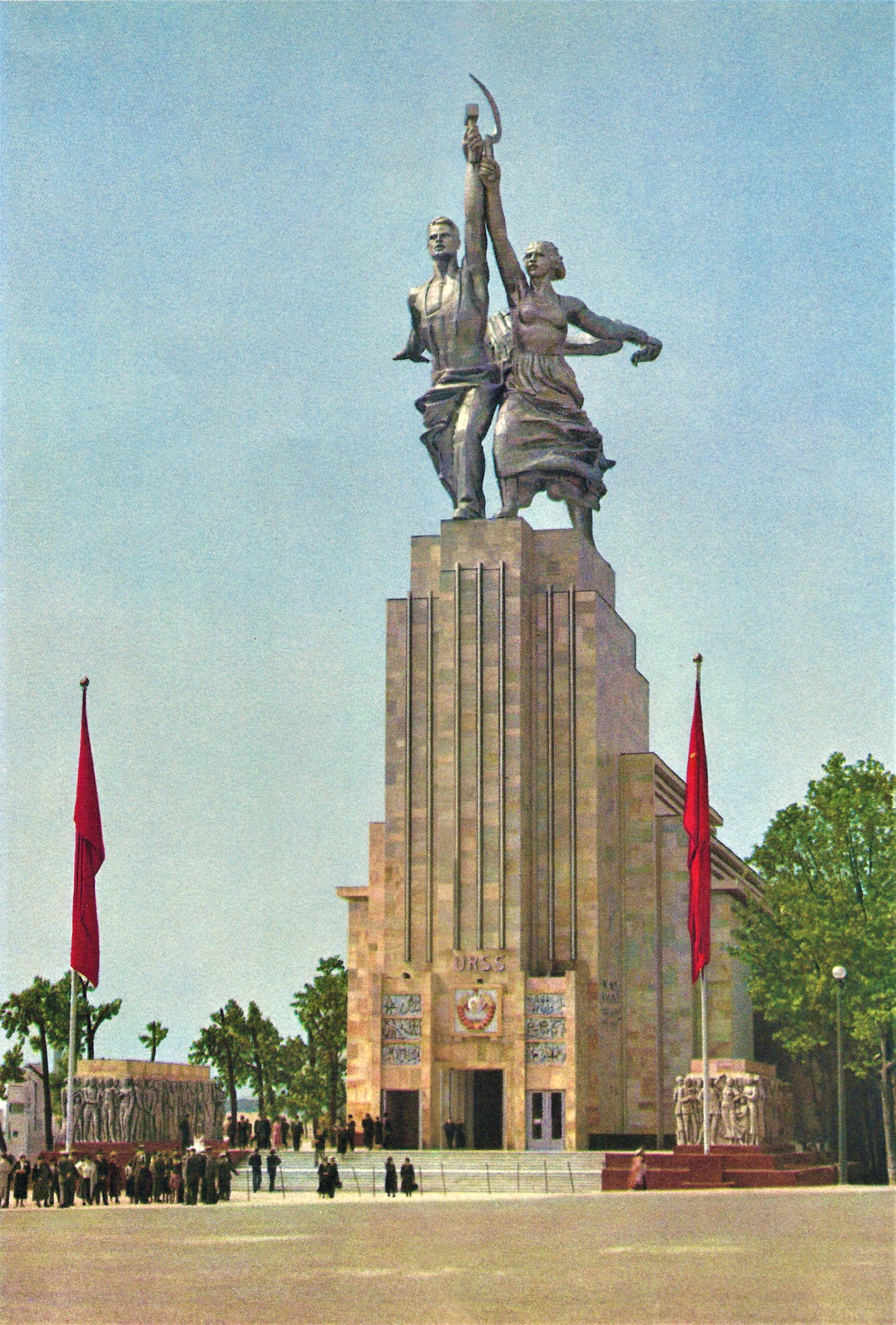
Worker and Kolkhoz Woman at the Soviet Pavilion of the 1937 World's Fair.

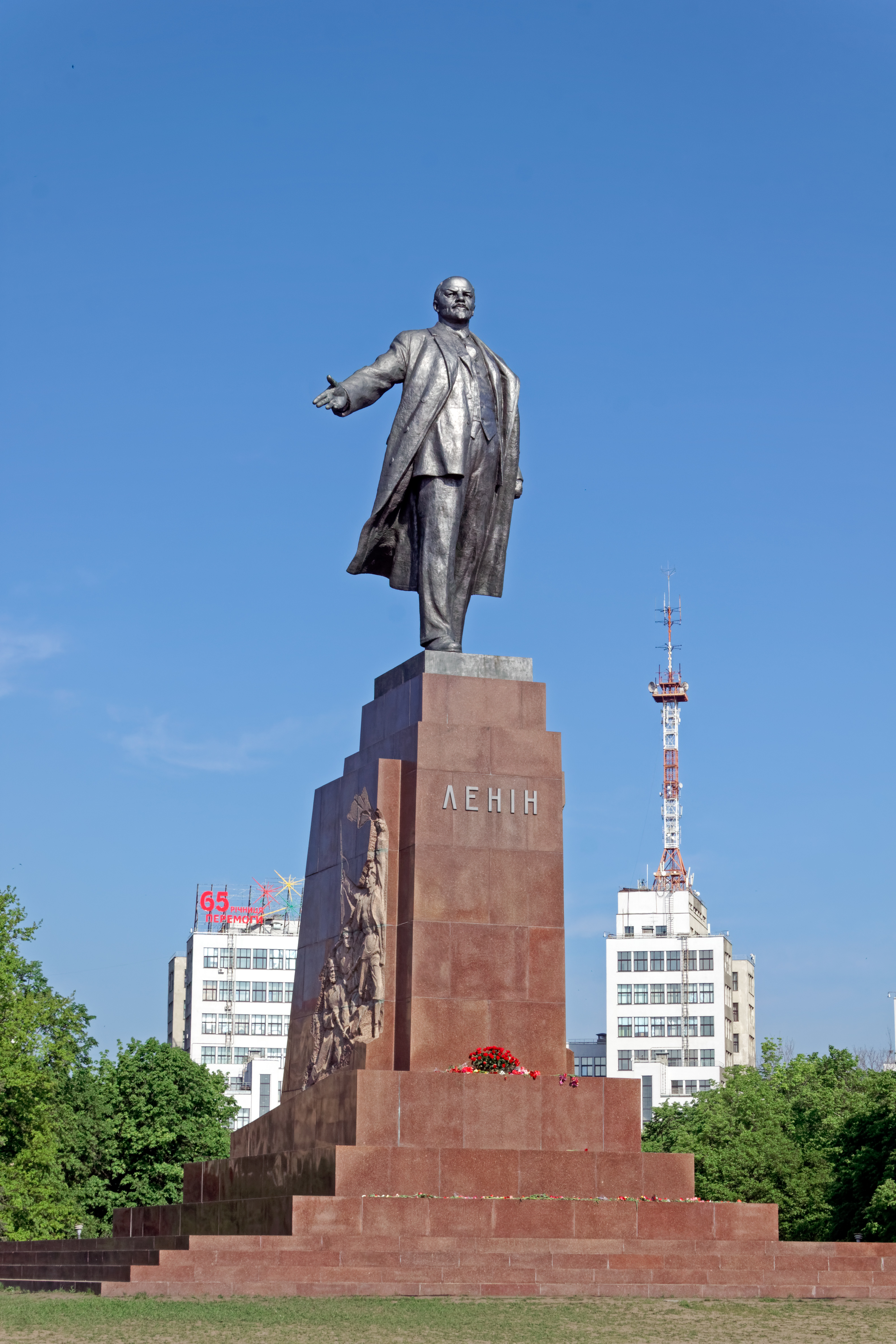
Statue of Lenin in Kharkiv, Ukraine. Toppled by nationalist protesters in 2014.

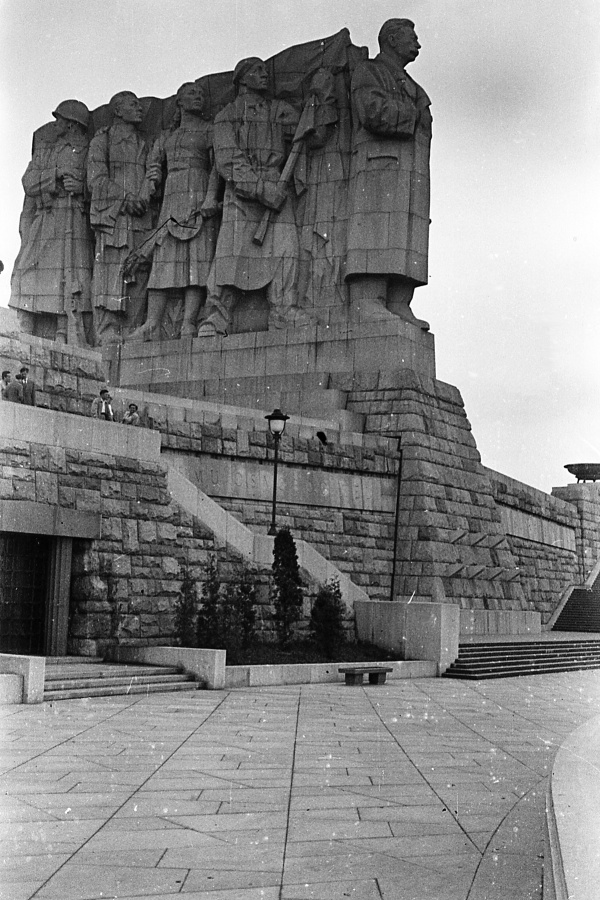
Stalin Monument in Prague, Czechoslovakia. Demolished in 1962.

== See also ==
- Socialist realism
- List of statues of Lenin
- Palace of Soviets
- List of Mother Motherland statues
