= Allan Murdmaa =

Estonian architect (1934–2009)

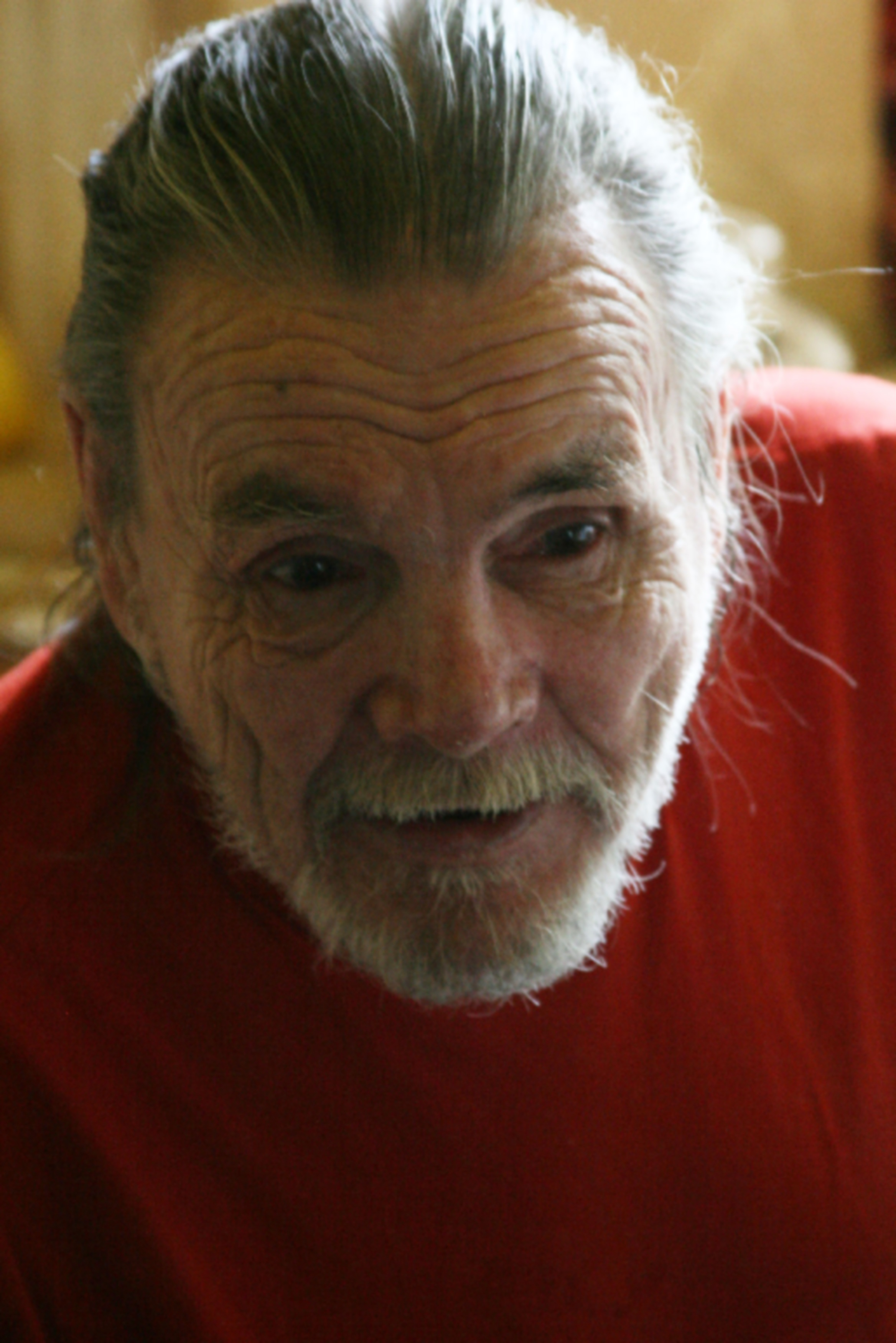
Allan Murdmaa

Allan Murdmaa (4 August 1934 – 15 November 2009) was an Estonian architect.

Murdmaa was born in Tallinn. He graduated from the Moscow Institute of Architecture in 1958.

From 1958 to 1960, Allan Murdmaa worked in the state design office Eesti Projekt. From 1960 to 1962, he worked as the chief artist of Tallinn. From 1963 to 1968 and 1970 to 1976, Allan Murdmaa worked in the State Art Institute of the Estonian SSR (today's Estonian Academy of Arts). From 1976 to 1981 and 1987 to 1992, he worked in the state design office Eesti Maaehitusprojekt.

Architectural production of Allan Murdmaa consists of numerous standardized projects for apartment buildings, schools, cinemas, and many interior designs. In addition, Allan Murdmaa has designed numerous monuments across Estonia - monuments of Amandus Adamson, Eduard Vilde, Heino Eller and Oskar Luts, the obelisk of the Tehumardi battle, the memorial of the victims of Stalinist Terror in Rakvere, and the memorial of Maarjamäe. Allan Murdmaa was a member of the Union of Estonian Architects.

His notable works include:

- Tehumardi War Memorial
- Maarjamäe Memorial

== Gallery ==
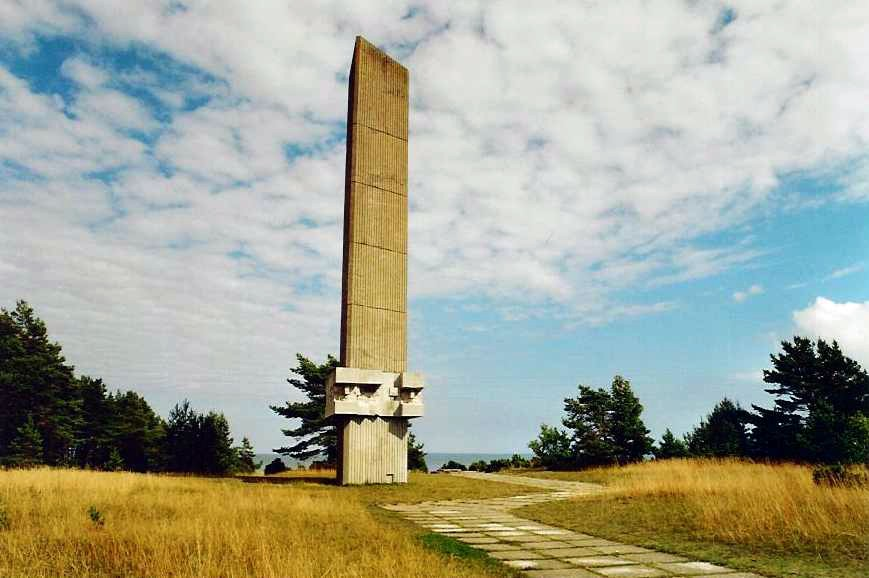
Tehumardi obelisk

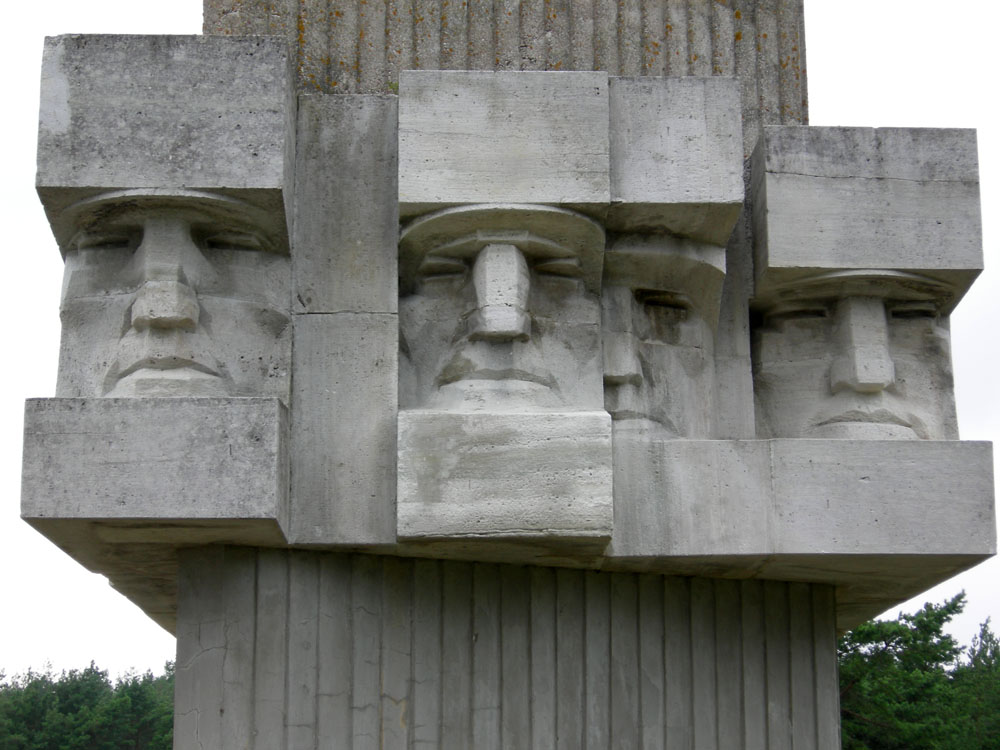
Faces on Tehumardi obelisk

== See also ==
- Architecture of Estonia
