= Robert Gödicke =

Russian architect of German origin (1829–1910)

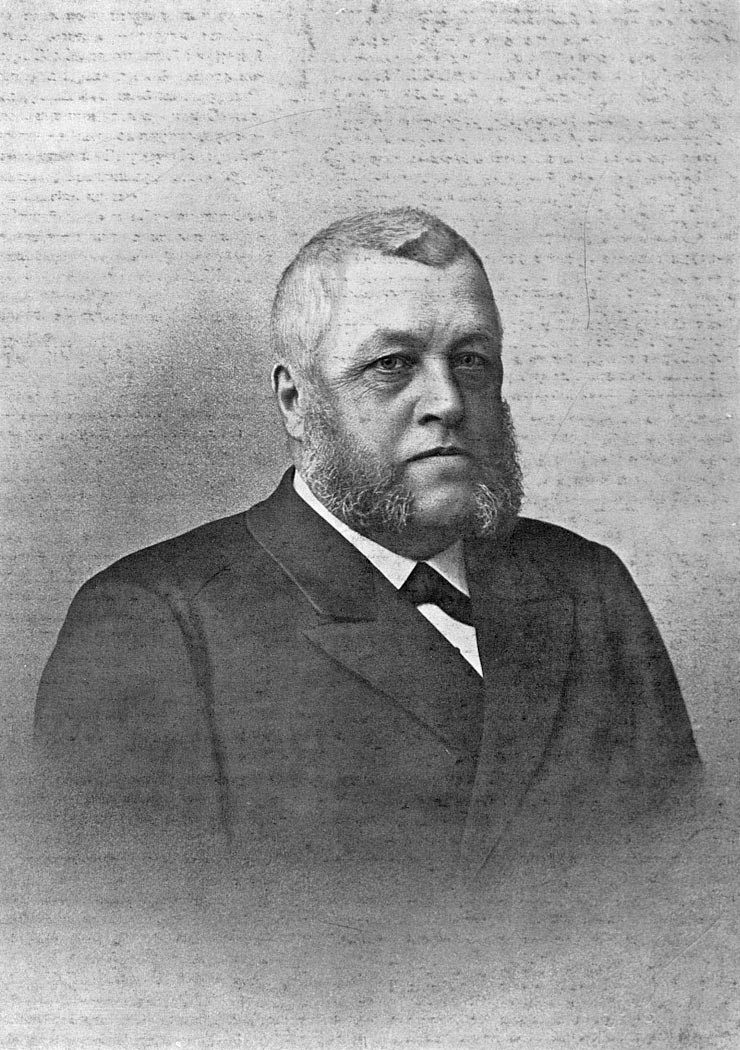
- Born: February 21, 1829; Saint Petersburg, Russia
- Died: March 4, 1910 (aged 81); Saint Petersburg, Russia
- Occupation: Architect

Robert Christoph Wilhelm Gödicke (Russian: Роберт Андреевич Гёдике, surname sometimes Giodike; February 29, 1829 – March 4, 1910) was a Russian architect of German origin that mainly worked in Saint Petersburg.

== Early life and education ==
Robert Gödicke was born in Saint Petersburg, the son of Gottlieb Daniel Andreas Gödicke (1793–1861) and Louise Friederike Gödicke (née Pöhl, 1806–1879). He studied architecture at the Art School of the Saint Petersburg Academy of Arts from 1846 to 1852 under Alexander Brullov.

== Career ==
From 1865 onward, he worked as a lecturer at the Art School of the Saint Petersburg Academy of Arts, and he was the head of the architecture department from 1891 to 1894. He received the title of academician in 1857 from the Academy of Arts, and he became a professor in 1864.

== Work ==
The buildings that Gödicke designed are mainly located in Saint Petersburg, but there are also a few buildings elsewhere in Russia. In Estonia, he is best known as the architect of Maarjamäe Palace.

=== Saint Petersburg ===
- 1862–1863: Breitfuß apartment building, Vasilyevsky Island Line 10 no. 5 (10-я линии Васильевского острова, дом № 5)
- 1872–1874: Renovation of the Orlov-Davydov private house into an apartment building, Tchaikovsky Street no. 27 (улица Чайковского, дом № 27)
- 1879–1881: The main building of the Stieglitz School of Art, 13 Salt Lane no. 13 (Соляной переулок, дом № 13), with Alexander Krakau
- 1901–1902: His own apartment building, Vasilyevsky Island Line 8 no. 23 (8-я линии Васильевского острова, дом № 23)

=== Tallinn ===
- 1874: The main building of Maarjamäe Palace. Currently one of the buildings of the Estonian History Museum

=== Novocherkassk ===
- 1887–1891: The new building of the Empress Maria Institute for Noble Maidens, Pushkin Street 111 (улица Пушкинская, дом № 111). Currently the main building of the Novocherkassk State Academy of Land Improvement

== Honors ==
- 1896: Privy councillor
- 1896: Honorary member of the Saint Petersburg Academy of Arts
