= List of parks and gardens in Estonia =

This is the list of parks and gardens located in Estonia. The list is incomplete.

Name	Location (city/parish, county)	Further info	Image
Barclay Square	Tartu, Tartu County		
Beach Park	Pärnu, Pärnu County		
Danish King's Garden	Tallinn, Harju County		
Glehn Park	Tallinn, Harju County		
Hirvepark	Tallinn, Harju County		
Jüriöö Park	Tallinn, Harju County		
Kadriorg Park	Tallinn, Harju County		
Kakumäe Coastal Park	Tallinn, Harju County		
Kanuti Garden	Tallinn, Harju County		
King's Square (Kuningaplats)	Tartu, Tartu County	Location of Gustav II Adolf´s monument	
Komandandi Garden			
Kuberneri Garden	Tallinn, Harju County		
Lillepi Park	Tallinn, Harju County		
Löwenruh Park	Tallinn, Harju County		
Luke Manor Park	Tartu County, Nõo Parish	Around the Luke Manor	
Meremäe Park of Mourning	Meremäe, Setomaa Parish		
Pae Park	Tallinn, Harju County		
Police Garden	Tallinn, Harju County		
Suuremõisa Park	Hiiu County, Hiiu Parish		
Tammsaare Park	Tallinn, Harju County		
Toompark	Tallinn, Harju County		
Toila-Oru Park	Ida-Viru County, Toila Parish		
Ülejõe Park	Tartu, Tartu County	Former name: Tammsaare Park	
