= Charles Leroux Monument =

Monument in Tallinn, Estonia

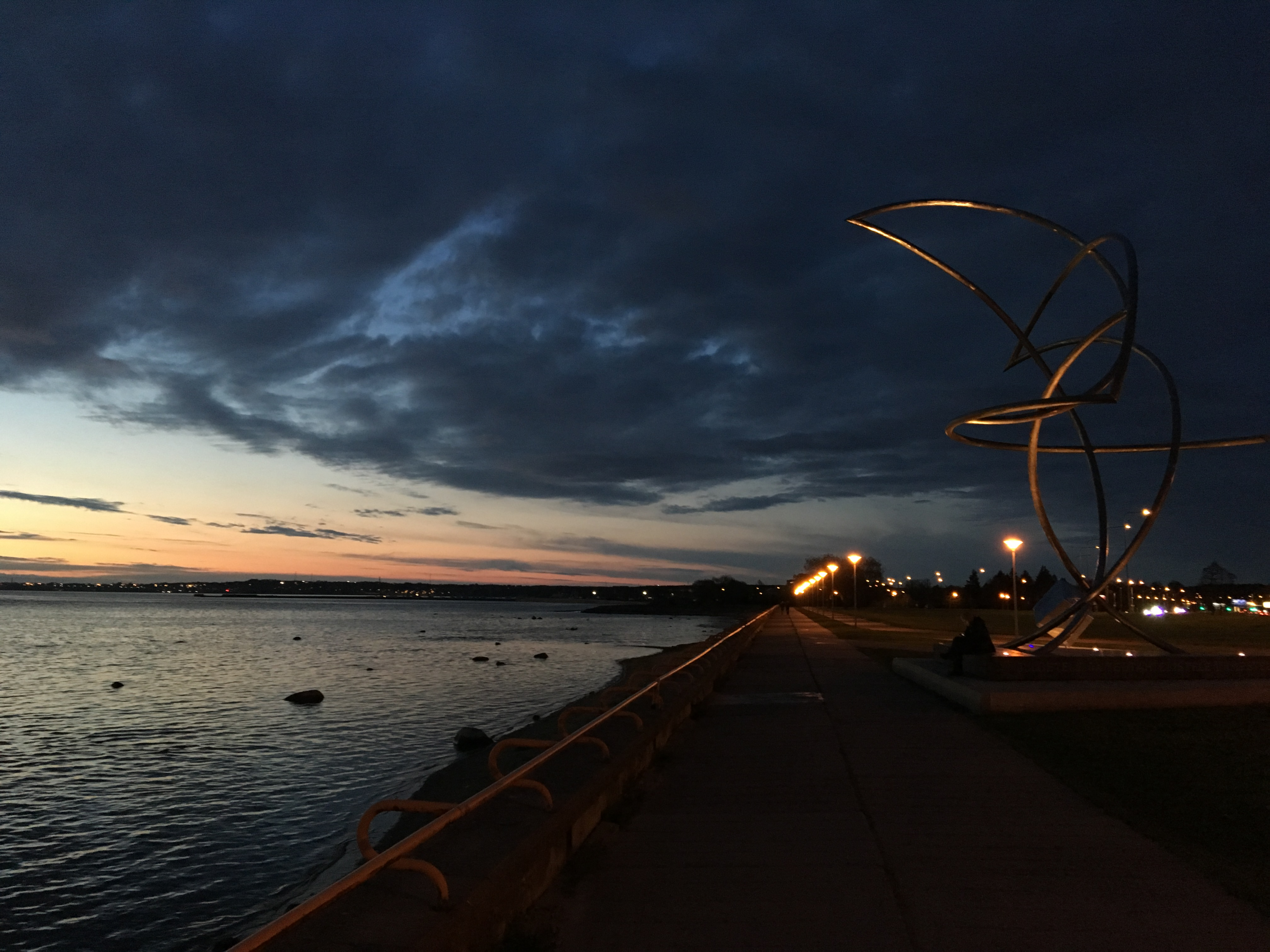
- Charles Leroux Monument
- 59°27′33″N 24°48′48″E
- Location: Tallinn, Estonia
- Opening date: 1989

Charles Leroux Monument (Estonian: Charles Leroux' monument, also in Estonian: Julgetele ja teotahtelistele inimestele) is a sculpture in Maarjamäe, Tallinn, Estonia.

The sculpture was made by Mati Karmin. The sculpture was opened in 1989.
