= Harjumägi =

Park in Tallinn, Estonia

Coordinates: 59°26′02″N 24°44′30″E

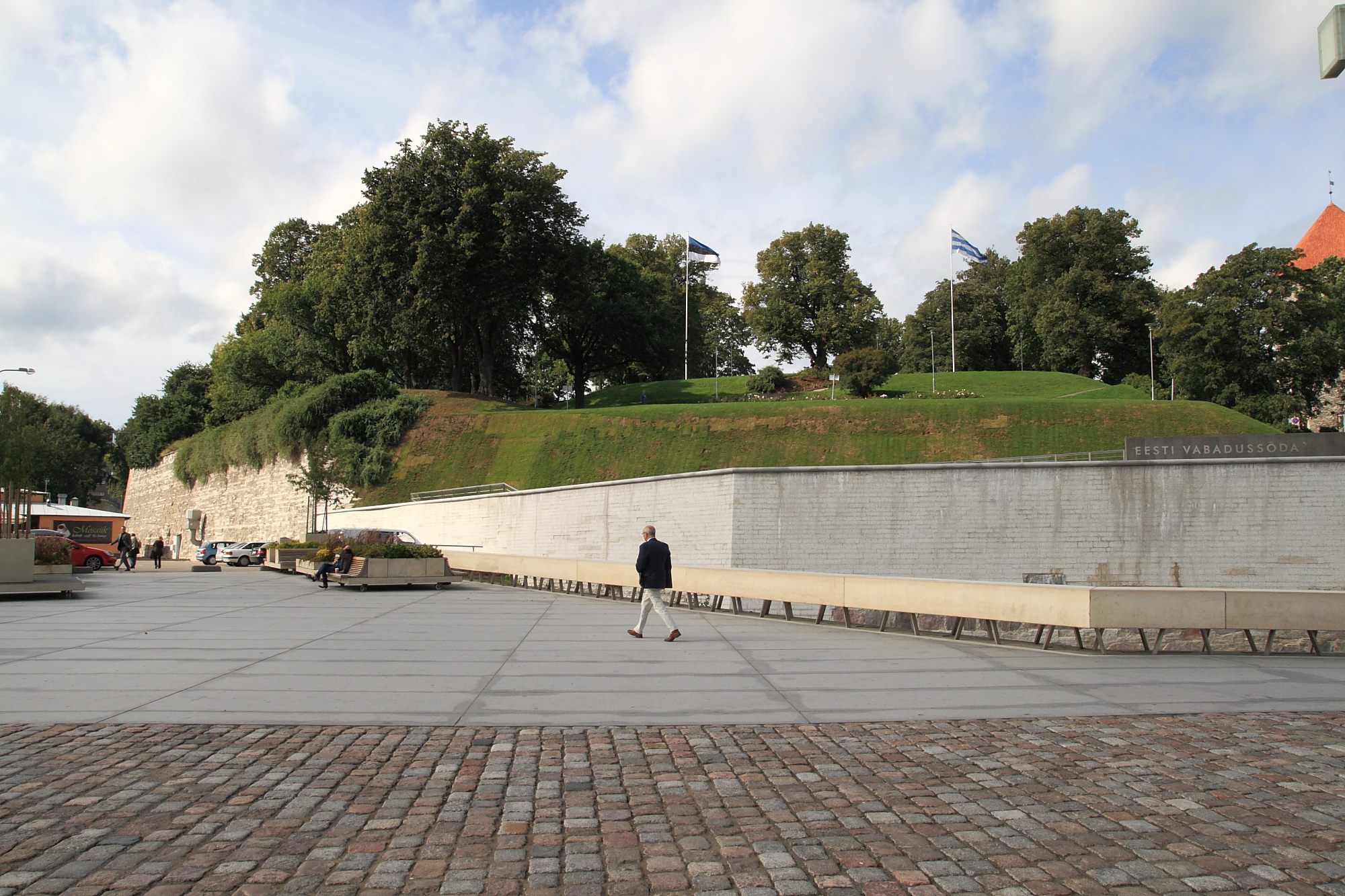
View of Harjumägi (September 2011)

Harjumägi (also Harju Gate Hill; Estonian: Harjuvärava mägi) is a park in Tallinn, Estonia.

The park is located on the Ingrian Bastion. The Ingrian Bastion was built in the 1690s. From 1861–1862, the Ingrian Bastion was converted into the park. At the same time, the Mayer's Stairs were built.

Since 1959, the park has had protected status.
