= Maarjamäe Palace =

Manor house in Tallinn, Estonia

Coordinates: 59°27′09″N 24°48′36″E

- Maarjamäe suvemõis
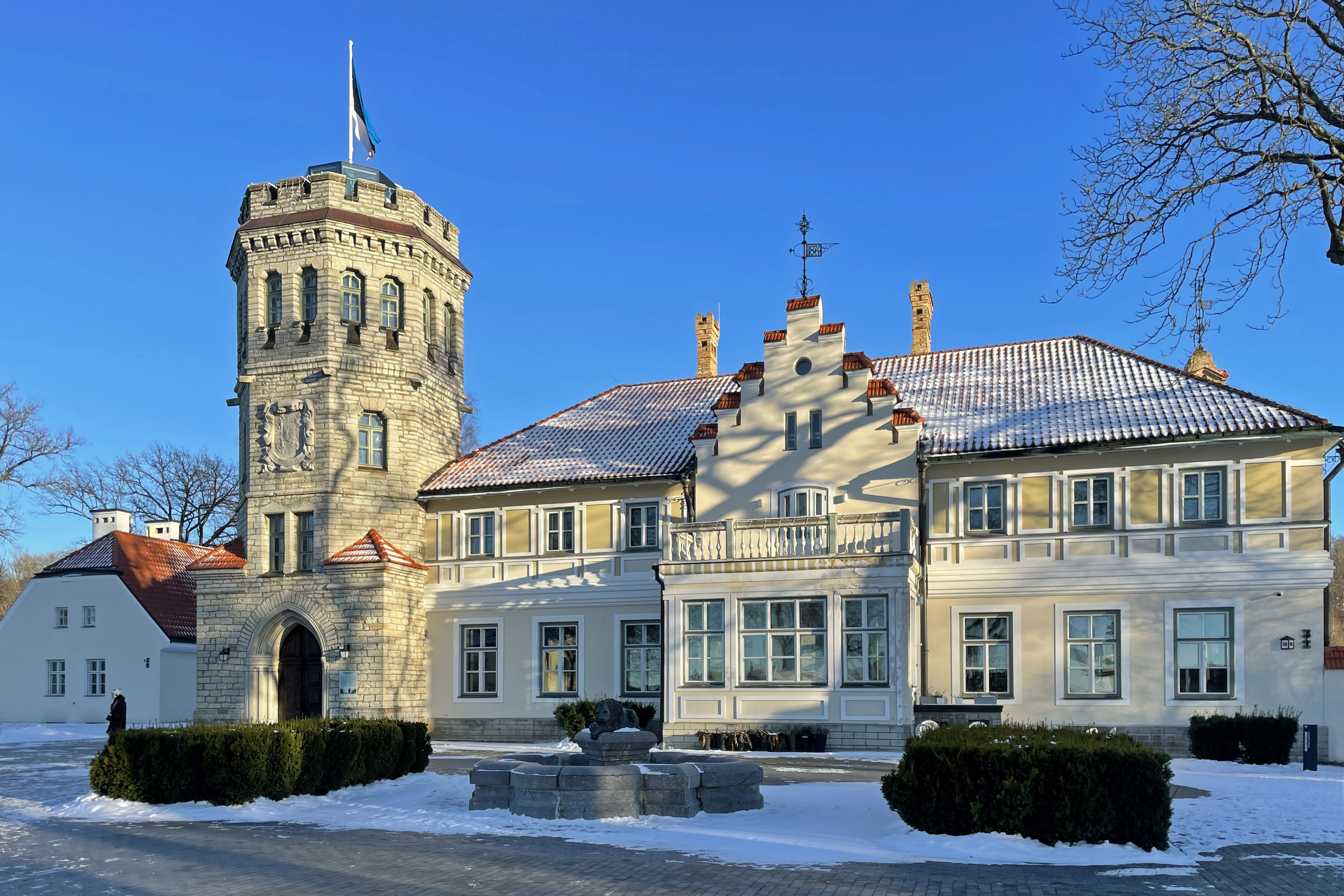
- Maarjamäe Palace in the winter
- Alternative names: Maarjamäe Castle

General information
- Architectural style: Historicist
- Location: Maarjamäe, Tallinn, Estonia
- Completed: 1872 (or 1874)

Design and construction
- Architect: Robert Gödicke

Maarjamäe Palace (or Maarjamäe Castle) is a building in Maarjamäe, Tallinn. The palace is located at the site of the earlier Maarjamäe summer manor (Estonian: Maarjamäe suvemõis), which is its main building. Today, the palace is used by the Estonian History Museum.

The palace was designed by the architect Robert Gödicke and built in 1872 (or 1874). The palace was designed in the historicist style. The park has an exhibition of Soviet-era statues dating from the Soviet occupation that were removed from other public spaces following the Estonian Sovereignty Declaration in 1988.
