= Beach Park (Pärnu) =

Park in Pärnu, Estonia

Coordinates: 58.379°N 24.491°E

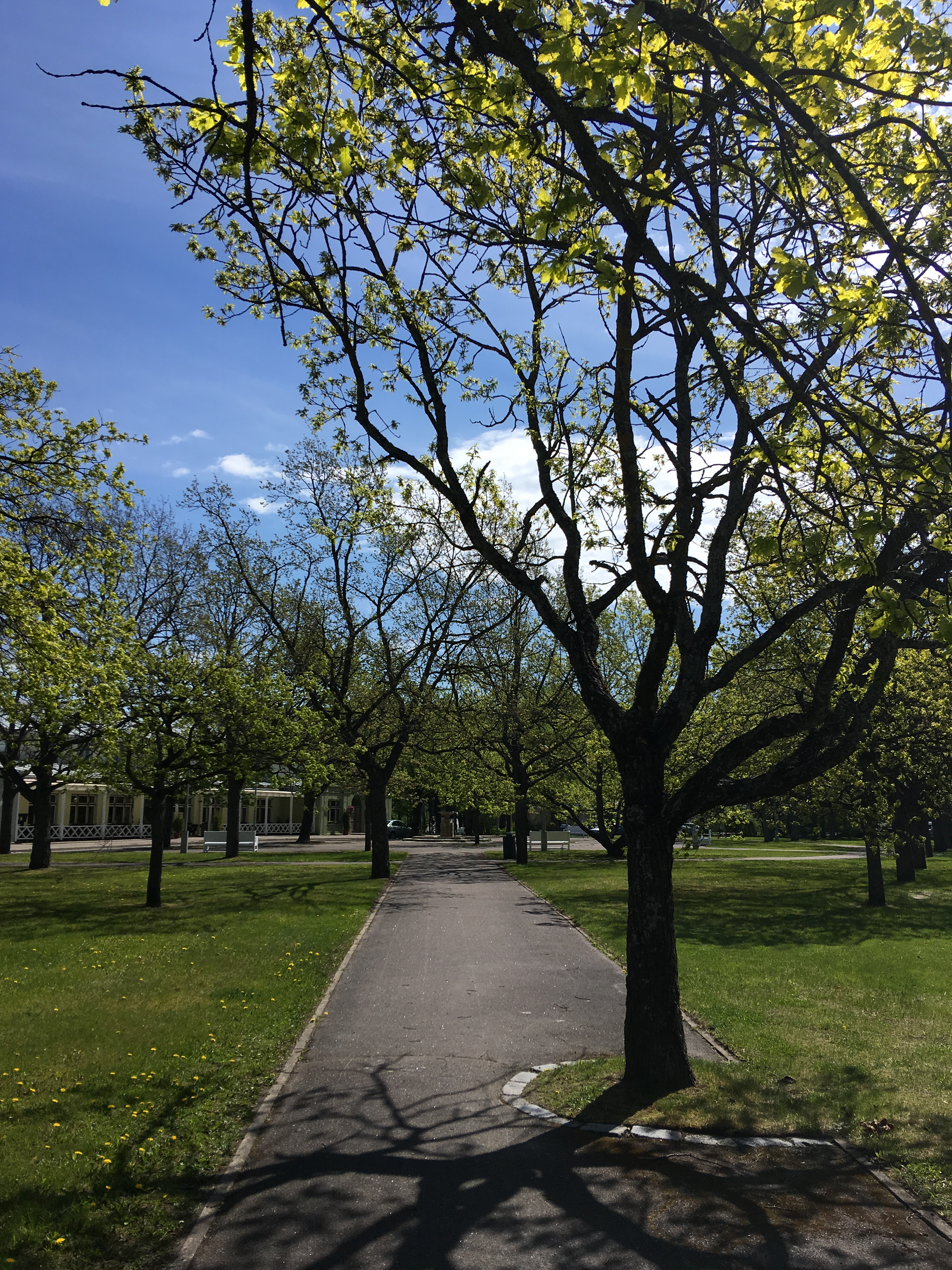
Pärnu Beach Park

Beach Park (Estonian: Pärnu rannapark) is a park near Pärnu Bay, administratively in Pärnu, Estonia. Taking into account its species richness, this park is the second town park in Estonia. The park is popular walking and recreation area. The area of the park is 45 ha.

The park was established in 1882.

In 1960, big renovation works took place. In 2010, the eastern part of the park was reconstructed.

In the park, there are located, for example, Pärnu Mud Baths, Beach Hotel, Beach Salon, Ammende Villa.
