= Maarjamäe Memorial =

Monument in Tallinn, Estonia

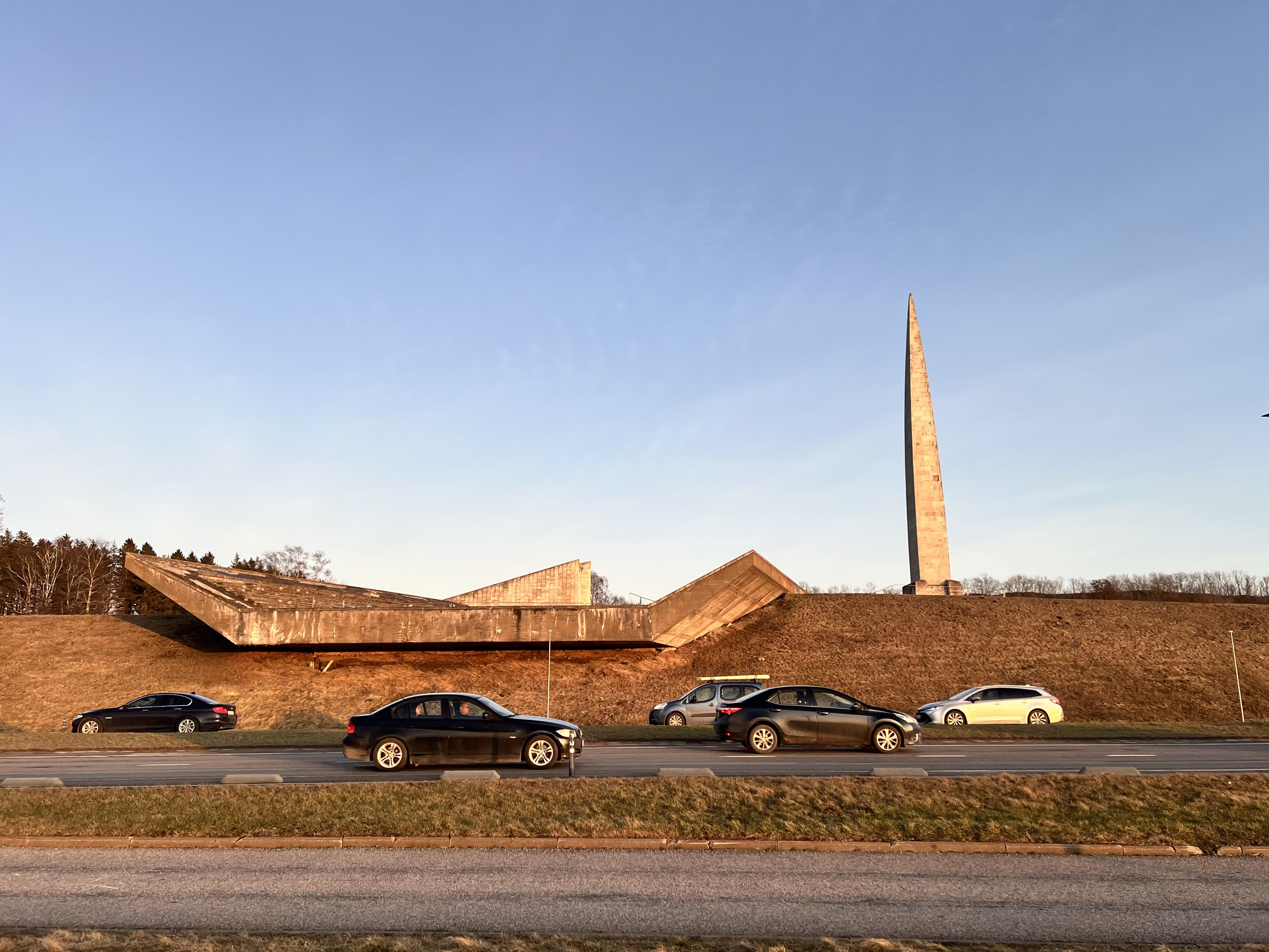
- Maarjamäe Memorial
- Interactive map of Maarjamäe Memorial
- Location: Pirita tee 80, Tallinn, Estonia
- Coordinates: 59°27′19″N 24°48′44″E

The Maarjamäe Memorial (Estonian: Maarjamäe memoriaal) is a memorial in Tallinn, Estonia. It is located on Pirita Road in the subdistrict of Kadriorg, between the Lasnamäe Plateau and Tallinn Bay. The memorial was constructed between 1960 and 1975, and is dedicated to soldiers who died fighting for the Soviet Union during World War II, as well as sailors who died during the 1918 Ice Cruise of the Baltic Fleet.

The memorial forms part of the Maarjamäe memorial complex, which also includes a German World War II cemetery and, since 2018, Estonia's Victims of Communism memorial.

== History ==
=== Soviet era (1940-1991) ===
A Soviet cemetery had existed at Maarjamäe in 1940, containing the graves of Red Army soldiers who had died fighting to control Tallinn in World War II. However, these graves were exhumed when the German Army took over the city in 1941.

The first stage of the memorial was built in 1960. A 35 m (115 ft) tall white obelisk was erected at the site, surrounded by bronze plaques which commemorated the lives lost in the Ice Cruise of the Baltic Fleet, an Imperial Russian naval retreat from Tallinn to Kronstadt in 1918. The obelisk was designed by architect Mart Port and sculptor Lembit Tolli.

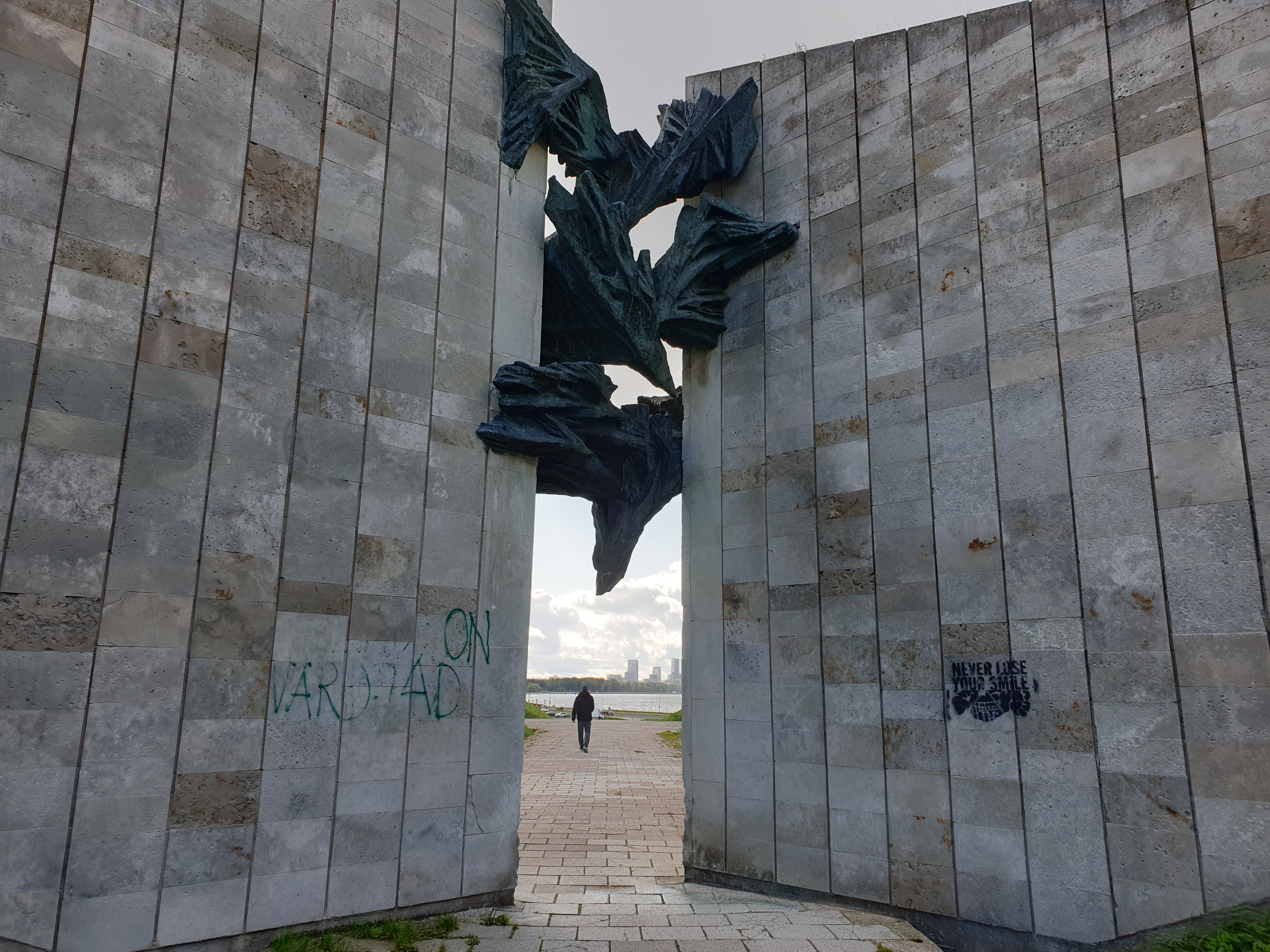
The Perishing Seagulls bronze sculpture

Between 1965 and 1975, new features were added to commemorate soldiers who had fallen in the course of the Soviet World War II campaign, known in Soviet history as the Great Patriotic War. These included a large ceremonial square ('Reconciliation Square') with stands of seating, a sculpture of two open palms above an eternal flame, a bronze rendition of three seagulls named 'Perishing Seagulls', and ten symbolic graves, among other architectural and landscaping features. These were primarily designed by architect Allan Murdmaa and sculptor Matti Varik. The memorial was initially intended to have further features which were not ultimately built; the project was prematurely halted in 1975 as a result of perceived religious undertones in aspects of the monument which had already been built.

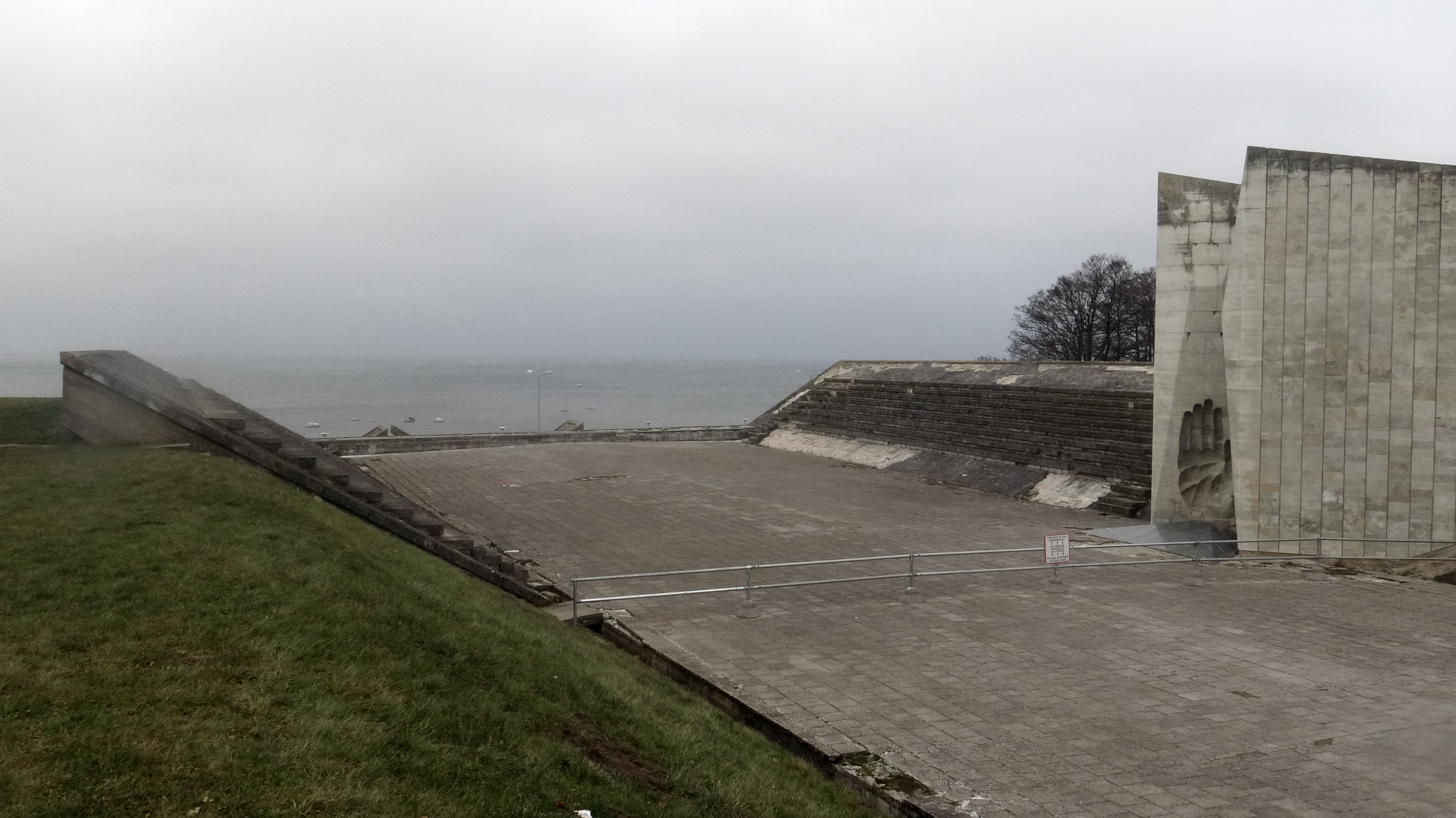
The ceremonial square behind a metal barrier, 2018

=== Post-independence era ===
Following Estonia's restoration of independence in 1991, the new government decided not to maintain the memorial and, following the Red Army's withdrawal from the country in 1994, components which had explicitly conveyed the site's ideological message, such as the eternal flame and bronze plaques, were removed. The memorial's physical condition has continued to deteriorate over time, and various barriers and warning signs have been used to warn visitors of dangerous areas as well as restrict access for safety reasons. As a result of this, it has also seen use 'informally' as an area for activities such as skateboarding and drinking.

In 2020, mayor of Tallinn Mihhail Kõlvart expressed support for the reconstruction of the memorial, ruling out the possibility of demolition under his watch; this followed comments made by the minister of the interior, Mart Helme, who had suggested that removing the site was the best course of action. Kõlvart further stated that the Estonian state ought to put forward 3-4 million euros for its repair. However land ownership discrepancies, among other things, have slowed progress; the obelisk is owned by the City of Tallinn but the rest of the site is owned by the state.
