= Estonian History Museum =

Museum in Tallinn, Estonia

- Eesti Ajaloomuuseum
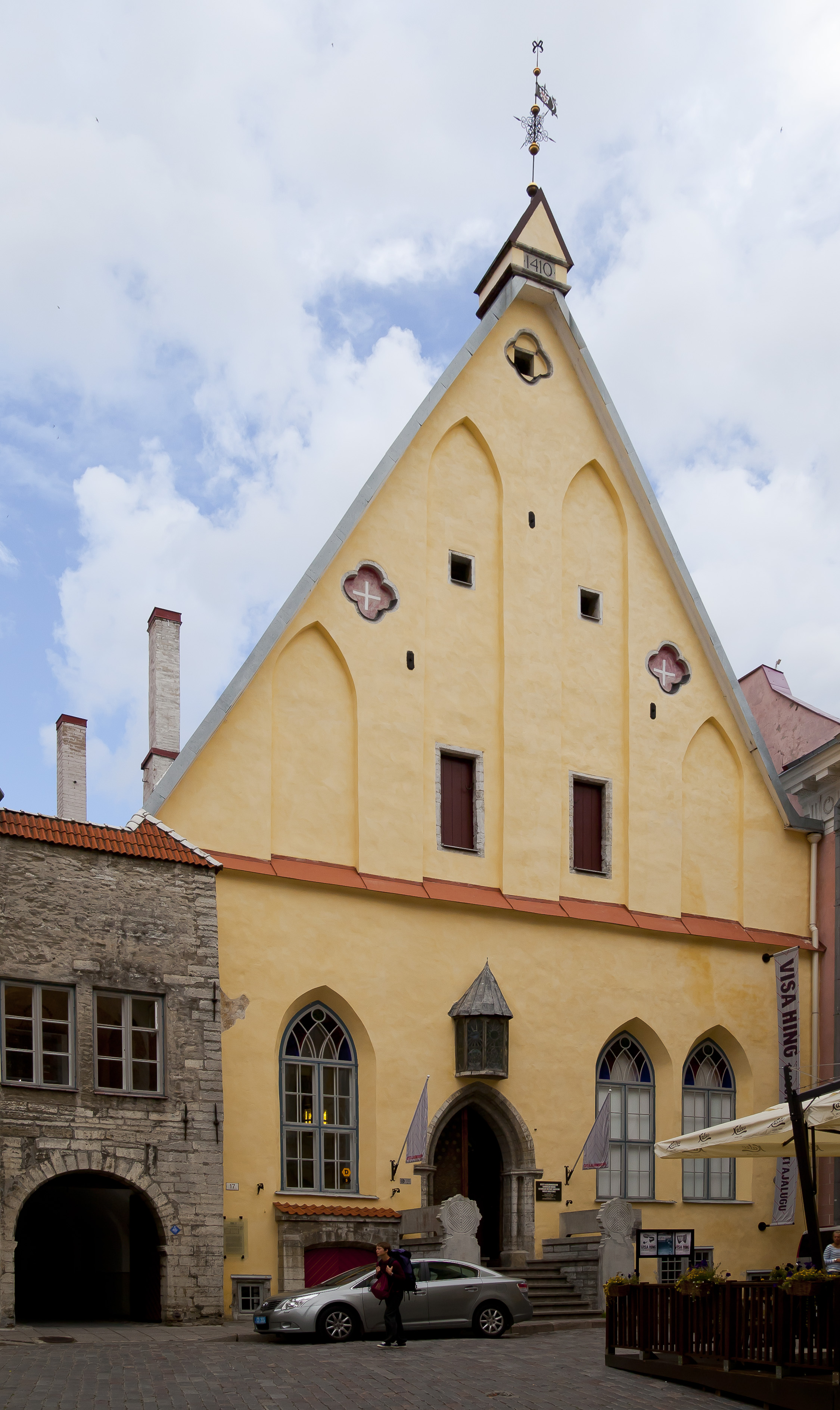
- The Great Guild hall
- Former name: Provincial Museum
- Established: 19 February 1864
- Location: Pikk 17 and Pirita tee 56, Tallinn, Estonia
- Coordinates: 59°26′18″N 24°44′41″E
- Type: History museum
- Collection size: 280,747 (2008)
- Visitors: 55,777 (2013)
- Founder: Estonian Literature Society
- Director: Sirje Karis
- Public transit access: Maarjamägi, TLT (The Maarjamäe Manor)
- Website: www.ajaloomuuseum.ee

Estonian History Museum (Estonian: Eesti Ajaloomuuseum) is a museum about the history of Estonia in Tallinn. It was initially established by the pharmacist Johann Burchart, who ran the town hall pharmacy known as the Raeapteek.

Inaugurated in 1987, it picks up where its counterpart leaves off in the mid-nineteenth century to cover the political and social upheavals of the twentieth century. Its exhibits include historically dressed mannequins and recreations of domestic interiors. The 1940s and 1950s are represented by army uniforms and weapons. There is an original hut used by the Forest Brothers, the legendary partisans who fought against the Soviet occupation, and a replica of a desk used by a communist party secretary.

The museum has four locations: Maarjamäe Palace, the Great Guild hall, the Film Museum, and the Theatre and Music Museum.

== History ==
In 1802, Tallinn pharmacist Johann Burchard started a collection called Mon Faible (My Weakness). Its first item was an opium pipe from China. In 1822, Buchard hosted an exhibition in the House of the Brotherhood of the Blackheads.

In 1842, the Estonian Literary Society (German: Estländische Literärische Gesellschaft) and began collecting materials to form a museum. In 1864, the Provincial Museum of the Estonian Literature Society was founded at Canute Guild.

During the Soviet occupation of Estonia, the museum was nationalized, and its collections given to other museums. Unfortunately, some of its materials were destroyed.

In 1952, the museum moved to the Great Guild Hall. In 1989, it was renamed the Estonian History Museum.

== Maarjamäe Palace ==
In 1873, Count Anatoli Orlov-Davydov (1837–1905) purchased the plot of land Maarjamäe Palace sits on today from Christian Abraham Rotermann, who had built a steam mill and factories on the land. Orlov-Davydov named the land Marienberg, likely in honor of his wife Maria. Maarjamäe is the Estonian version of Maria.

Due to the 1917 Revolution in Russia, the Orlov-Davydovs leased out the manor. From 1933 to 1937, the manor hosted a restaurant and hotel opened. The manor was then purchased by the Estonian government who used it to house the Military Aviation School of the Republic of Estonia. The school closed when the Soviets began occupying Estonia, and in 1940, the Soviet Army took over the building.

In 1987, the History of Revolution Museum of the Estonian SSR opened in the manor. When Estonia regained independence in 1991, the museum was renovated and updated.

The Film Museum, established in 2006, moved to the palace's complex in 2017. The park has an exhibition of Soviet-era statues by Estonian artists, dating from the Soviet occupation.

== Buildings ==
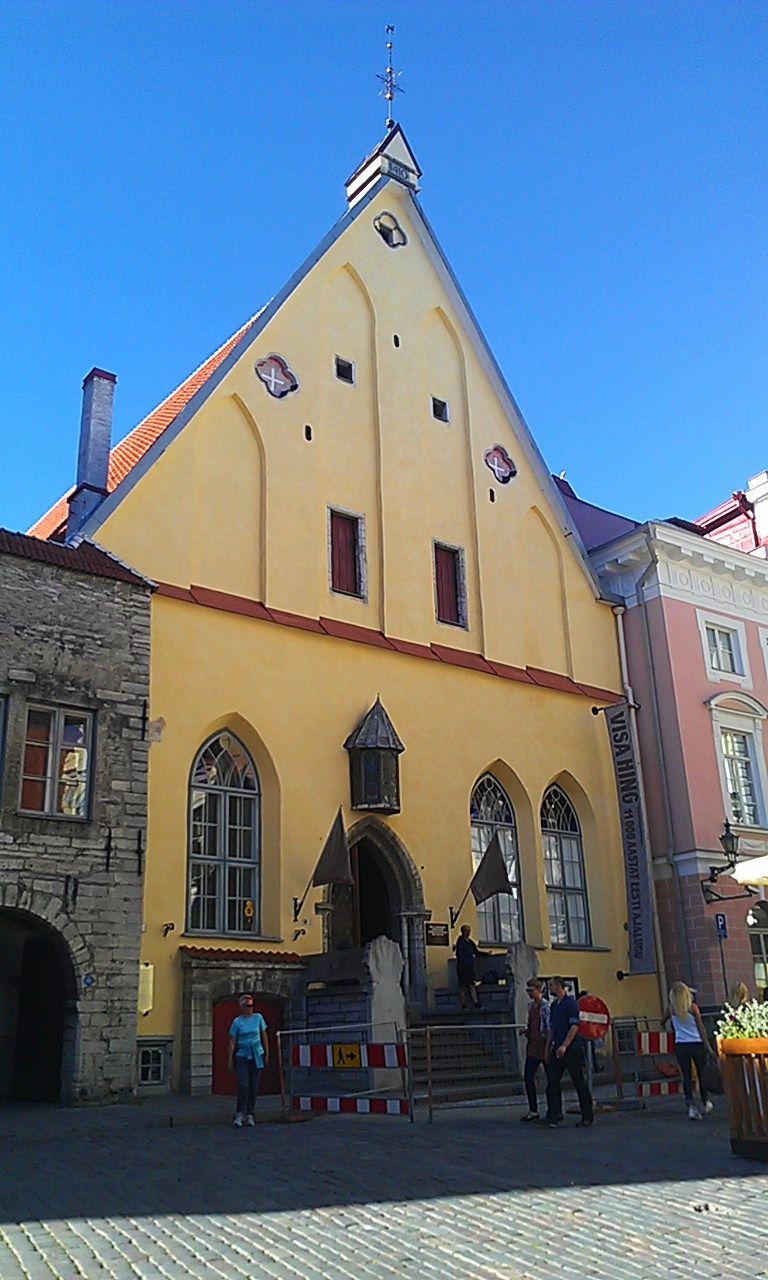
Entrance to Great Guild Hall in Tallinn old town

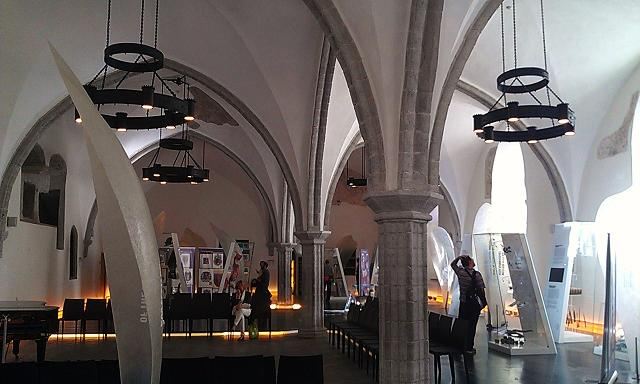
Interior of Guild Hall

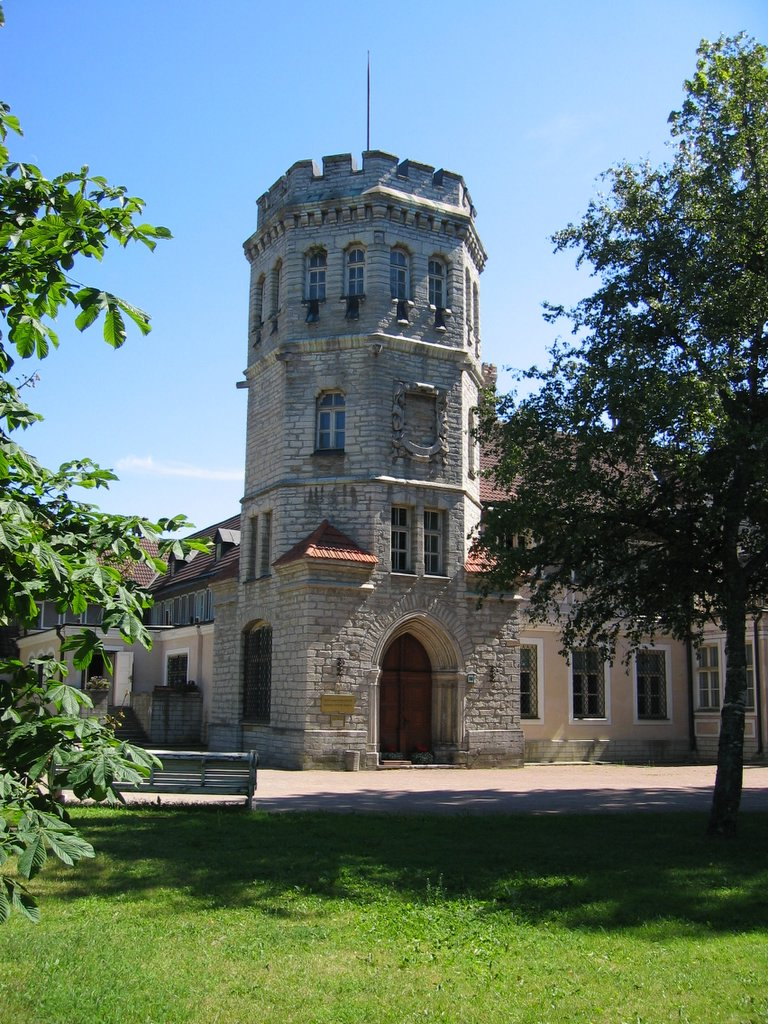
Maarjamäe Palace (Orlov Castle) in Maarjamäe

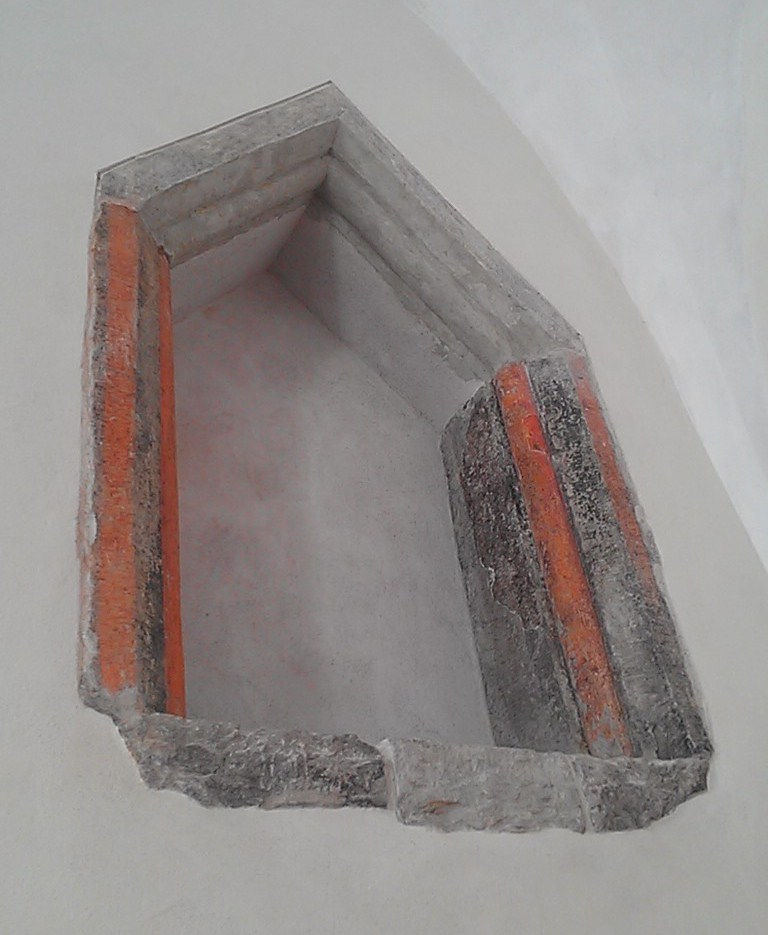
Niche in wall of Guild Hall

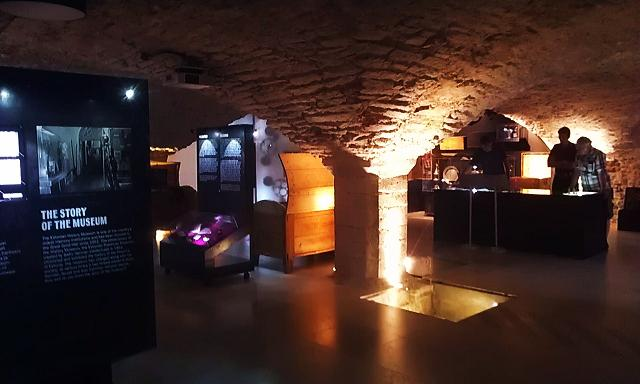
Basement of Guild Hall

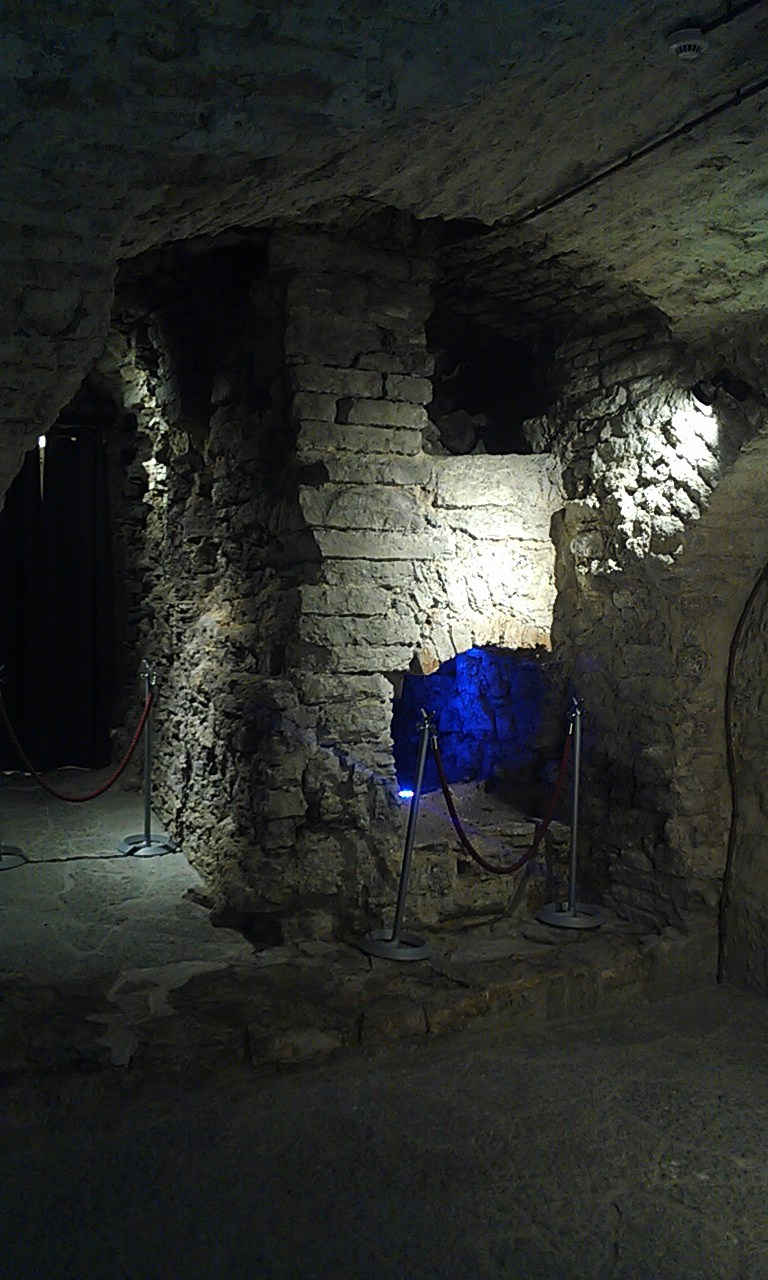
Medieval Stokers' Room
