= List of statues of Karl Marx =

This article lists statues of Karl Marx. Among the sites of statues of Marx are cities in Germany and Russia, including the capital of the defunct German Democratic Republic.

== Germany ==
Location	Main article	Image	Notes
Aken (Elbe)			
Berlin	Marx-Engels Forum		The statues of Karl Marx (foreground) and his collaborator Friedrich Engels in Marx-Engels-Forum in reunited Berlin. In the background is the dome of the Berlin Cathedral.
Berlin			Bust located on Strausberger Platz.
Berlin	Karl Marx Memorial in Berlin-Stralau		This monument designed in 1964 is located in Berlin-Stralau, where Marx lived as a student in 1837.
Chemnitz (formerly Karl-Marx-Stadt)	Karl Marx Monument		This famous 7.1m bust of Karl Marx, hewn from Ukrainian granite, is Chemnitz's most famous landmark.
Chemnitz (formerly Karl-Marx-Stadt)			1972 relief sculpture "Lob der Dialektik" (Praise of Dialectics) depicting Marx and Engels, forming part of a four-part monument based on the poems of Bertolt Brecht, modeled on designs by Joachim Jastram and located on Brückenstrasse.
Cologne			Statues of Karl Marx (right) and Heinrich Becker (left) on the tower of Cologne City Hall
Coswig (Anhalt)			Designed by Karl Kothe and erected in 1958 on the 75th anniversary of Marx's death.
Dessau			Erected in October 1984.
Döbeln			
Dresden	Karl Marx Monument (Dresden)		Installed on Unity Square (now Albertplatz) in 1953. It was ridiculed for its unusual proportions and was later demolished.
Frankfurt (Oder)	Karl Marx Monument, Frankfurt (Oder)		Bust designed in 1968 by Arnd Wittig, located in Lennépark on Karl-Marx-Straße.
Fürstenwalde	Karl Marx Monument (Fürstenwalde)		Originally installed in 1904 as a Bismarck monument, the stone was rededicated to Marx in the 1950s. It was renovated in 2003.
Gelsenkirchen			Installed in front of the Marxist–Leninist Party of Germany's headquarters in Gelsenkirchen in 2022, alongside a statue of Vladimir Lenin installed in 2020.
Leipzig	Bronzerelief Aufbruch		A 1973 relief depicting Marx originally installed on a building of the University of Leipzig but relocated in 2008.
Neubrandenburg	Karl Marx Monument (Neubrandenburg)		Originally stood from 1969-2001, reinstalled in a new location in 2018.
Neuruppin			Designed by Fritz Cremer, erected in 1954.
Rathenow			
Trier	Karl Marx Statue (Trier)		Created by Chinese artist Wu Weishan in 2018 and donated by China to Trier, the birthplace of Karl Marx. The unveiling of the statue was met with protests
Werder (Havel)			
Wernigerode	Karl Marx Monument (Wernigerode)		Bust created by Rudolf Wewerka and inaugurated on the 70th anniversary of Marx's death on November 7, 1953.
Wittenberge			Inscribed with Marx's quote: "Proletarier aller Länder vereinigt euch" (Proletarians of all countries, unite).

== Russia ==
Location	Main article	Image	Notes
Arzamas			
Balashikha			Located on Krupeshina street. It was established in 1919.
Belgorod			He changed his location in the city five times, suffered due to an attack by the Ukrainian Armed Forces, lost an arm and even completely fell apart.
Vyazma			
Glazov			
Kaliningrad			
Kaluga			Bust located on the corner of Lenin Street and Moscow Street.
Kamensk-Uralsky			The twin brother of the monument from Belgorod.
Kamensk-Shakhtinsky			
Karl Marx Settlement (Saratov Region)			Located in a village named after Karl Marx near the city of Engels, Saratov Oblast.
Kopeysk			Statue of Marx and Engels.
Kotovsk			
Krasnodar			
Marks			
Mineralnye Vody			
Moscow	Karl Marx monument		Located on Theatre Square near the Bolshoi
Novaya Ladoga			
Penza			Bust of Marx atop a tall plinth, dismantled in 2011. In 2014, it was moved to a different location.
Petrozavodsk			Statue of Marx and Engels seated at the intersection of Karl Marx Avenue and Kuibyshev Street.
Podolsk			
Rostov-on-Don	Karl Marx Monument (Rostov-on-Don)		Installed in Karl Marx Square in 1959 to replace a prior statue installed in 1925 that was destroyed during World War 2, which had itself replaced a monument to Catherine II demolished by the Bolsheviks.
Saint Petersburg			Bust located at the Smolny Institute
Sobinka			Completed in 1923
Stavropol			
Suponevo			
Tashir			Large sculpture of Marx's head, located in the middle of Tashir in the Republic of Buryatia.
Tolyatti			Bust located on Liberty Square
Tula			
Tver			
Ulyanovsk			Completed in 1920
Elektrostal			
Yaroslavl			

== Other countries ==
Country	Location	Image	Description
Belarus	Luninets		Bust of Marx.
Belarus	Vitebsk		Bust of Marx.
Bulgaria	University of National and World Economy in Sofia		Bust of Marx.
China	Fuxing Park, Shanghai		Statue of Marx and Engels.
China	Compilation and Translation Bureau, Beijing		Statue of Marx seated and Engels standing.
China	Foshan University in Foshan, Guangdong Province		Relief sculpture of Marx and Copernicus.
Czech Republic	Karlovy Vary		Karl Marx monument near the orthodox church of St. Peter and Paul.
Czech Republic	Háj u Duchcova		
Ethiopia	Addis Ababa University		Relief sculpture of Marx's face, gifted by the government of East Germany to celebrate the 10th anniversary of the Ethiopian Revolution and establishment of the Derg.
Hungary	Memento Park, Budapest		Marx and Engels statue.
Hungary	Corvinus University of Budapest		Marx seated inside Corvinus University (formerly Karl Marx University), removed in 2014.
India	Kolkata, West Bengal		Marx and Engels statue.
Italy	Riccione		Bust of Marx.
Kyrgyzstan	Bishkek		Statue of Marx and Engels seated in discussion.
Lithuania	Grūtas Park, Druskininkai		Busts of Marx and Engels alongside Lenin, Dzerzhinsky and Stalin.
Lithuania	Grūtas Park, Druskininkai		Statue of Marx.
Moldova	Chișinău		Bust of Marx
Spain	Kepa Enbeita Urretxindorra Square, Bilbao		Busts of Marx and Lenin.
Turkey	Middle East Technical University in Ankara		
Ukraine	Hadiach		Bust of Marx.
Ukraine	Markivka		Statue of Marx.
Ukraine	Pyriatyn		Bust of Marx.
Ukraine	Voronky		Statue of Marx.
Ukraine	Zhytomyr		Bust of Marx.
United Kingdom	Highgate Cemetery, London		Bust at the tomb of Marx.
Uzbekistan	Tashkent		Large bust on Amir Temur Square (formerly Revolution Square), removed in 1993.
Venezuela	Maracay		Bust of Marx.

== See also ==
- List of statues of Lenin
- List of statues of Stalin
- Monument to Friedrich Engels, Moscow
- Statue of Friedrich Engels, Manchester
- Chiang Kai-shek statues
