= Statue of Friedrich Engels =

Statue of Friedrich Engels may refer to:

- Statue of Friedrich Engels, Manchester
- Monument to Friedrich Engels, Moscow
