= Karl Marx monument, Moscow =

Statue of Karl Marx in Moscow, Russia

Monument to Karl Marx in Moscow
- Памятник Карлу Марксу
- Interactive map of Monument to Karl Marx in Moscow
- Location: Theatre Square, Moscow, Russia
- Coordinates: 55°45′30″N 37°37′10″E
- Designer: Lev Kerbel
- Type: Statue
- Material: Granite
- Opening date: 1961
- Dedicated to: Karl Marx

The Monument to Karl Marx (Russian: Памятник Карлу Марксу) in Moscow is a monument completed in 1961 by Soviet sculptor Lev Kerbel. It is located near the Bolshoi Theatre in Theatre Square.

The monument, weighing 160 tons, is made of a monolithic block of gray granite, mined near Dnepropetrovsk (now Dnipro, Ukraine) in the Kudashevsky mine quarry. Marx is depicted as a speaker standing on the podium, as if addressing the working people with a speech. The monument is decorated bearing the motto of the USSR "Proletarians of All Countries, Unite!" on the front. The sculptural composition is complemented by two granite pylons on both sides of the monument. One of them is carved with the words of Friedrich Engels, said at Marx's funeral: "His name and deed will outlive for centuries"; on the other - Lenin's phrase "The teaching of Marx is omnipotent because it is true."

== History ==
At the beginning of 1957, a new open all-Union competition was held for the best project for a monument to Marx; its winner was a creative team led by sculptor Lev Kerbel, and architects Ruben Begunts, Nikolai Kovalchuk, Vadim Makarevich and Vladimir Morgulis.

In October 1961 Nikita Khrushchev inaugurated the monument.

The monument was given protected status as an object of cultural significance by the government of the RSFSR in 1974, and has been included on the Russian cultural heritage register with a federal level of protection since 2016.

== In popular culture ==
In the opening credits of 1988 action film Red Heat, the monument is shown in wintertime, snow covering the front of the foundations.

Soviet actress Faina Ranevskaya notably described the monument as "a refrigerator with a beard".

== See also ==
- List of statues of Karl Marx
- Soviet-era statues
