= Karl Marx Year =

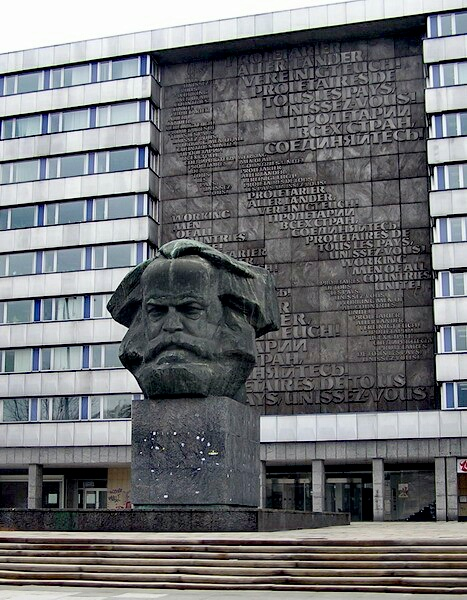
Karl Marx Monument in Chemnitz, commissioned in 1953 (erected 1971) with renaming of the city to Karl-Marx-Stadt.

Karl Marx Year (German: Karl-Marx-Jahr) was a series of anniversaries of Karl Marx commemorated by East Germany in 1953, 1968, and 1983. The most prominent was in 1953, for the 70th anniversary of Marx's death, and included the renaming of Chemnitz as Karl-Marx Stadt and of Leipzig University as Karl Marx University, the founding of the Order of Karl Marx, and the initiation of the Marx-Engels-Werke project of Marx and Engels' works. The 1968 commemoration marked the 150th anniversary of his birth, and 1983 the 100th anniversary of his death.

West Germany also commemorated Marx in anniversary years, with prominent renovations/reopenings of the Karl Marx House in 1968 and 1983. In 2018, Trier launched its own Karl Marx Year for the 200th anniversary of his birth.
