= 1987 visit by Erich Honecker to West Germany =

Visit of Erich Honecker to West Germany

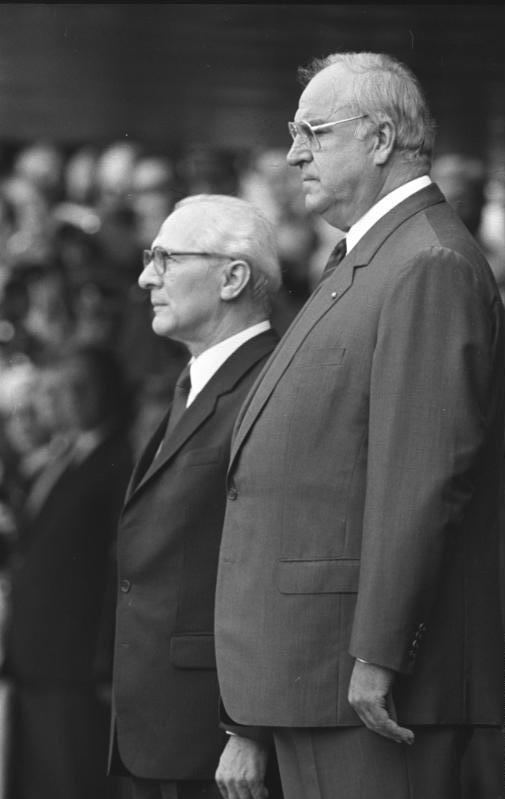
Honecker and Helmut Kohl at the Federal Chancellery in Bonn.

The visit of Erich Honecker to West Germany took place between 7–11 September 1987 in his official capacity as General Secretary of the Socialist Unity Party of Germany (SED) and Chairman of the State Council (president) of the German Democratic Republic (East Germany). It was the first and only visit undertaken by an East German leader during the partition of Germany. The five-day event was rated as an important step in the development of cross-German relations as well as Ostpolitik, which was implemented beginning with Willy Brandt, Chancellor of West Germany from 1969 to 1974.

== Preparations ==
Until 1986, Moscow blocked a possible visit by Honecker to the FRG. In 1984, Soviet leader Konstantin Chernenko and Honecker announced at a summit meeting that "the goal is not cooperation but demarcation". Soviet objections to Honecker's travel to the west were related both to Soviet interests in the block confrontation and to the policies of the Schmidt and Kohl governments in the NATO Double-Track Decision. It was also related to efforts to expand East Germany's limited independence in the realm of foreign policy. In March 1985, Chancellor Kohl renewed his invitation for Honecker to visit Bonn during Chernenko's state funeral. In autumn 1986, Mikhail Gorbachev sent a message to Honecker giving him consent to visit Bonn, which was a result of his own efforts to establish closer contacts with Western countries as part of the reorientation of Soviet politics through the policies of Glasnost and Perestroika. Discussions began in May 1987 on the organization of the visit to the FRG. To solidify this, Federal President Richard von Weizsäcker was received by Gorbachev in the Moscow Kremlin on 7 July 1987 to discuss the visit. The announcement of the abolition of capital punishment in the GDR on 17 July 1987 by the State Council was also related to Honecker's planned visit.

== Meetings and ceremonies ==
=== 7 September ===
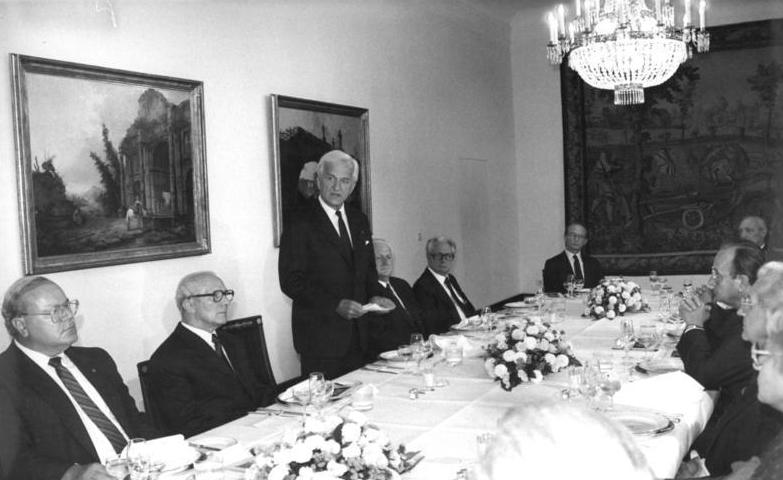
The dinner on 7 September. Honecker and Weizsäcker are seen in the center while other officials such as Günter Mittag and Vogel are also seen.

Honecker arrived at Cologne Bonn Airport in a Transportfliegergeschwader 44 Ilyushin Il-62. He was officially met by Wolfgang Schäuble, Chief of the Chancellery. From there he was transported in a motorcade to the Federal Chancellery where he arrived at half past nine in the morning. Upon his arrival, he was met by West German Chancellor Helmut Kohl and was given full state honours.

After an initial exchange of pleasantries between the two leaders, Honecker was invited into the neighboring Hammerschmidt Villa for a meeting with Federal President Weizsäcker for a working lunch. In his speech to the table Weizsäcker welcomed the guest as a "German among Germans" and called for further "system-opening cooperation". The afternoon of the first day of visit was mainly devoted to discussions in the Federal Chancellery, where it mainly went to topics such as travel and visitor traffic, border determination in the Elbe section, minimum exchange, town twinning and the shooting order.

In the evening, the federal government hosted a dinner for the delegations in the Redoute, where in the table speeches the basic political positions of the heads of state were exchanged. Chancellor Kohl had insisted in advance that the table speeches of the two heads of government are broadcast live on state television both in the FRG and in the GDR. The Chancellor emphasized the "awareness of the unity of the nation" and followed that up by saying that "the will to preserve it is unbroken". Honecker spent the night at Schloss Gymnich, which was used at that time as a state guest house.

=== 8 September ===
After the drive from Schloss Gymnich to Bonn's government district, Honecker conferred once again with Kohl and Schäuble in a small meeting. The Palais Schaumburg was also used during the visit for political discussions, receptions and contract signings. It was followed by Honecker meeting with Bundestag President Philipp Jenninger, and former President Karl Carstens as well as the chairmen of the parties represented in the Bundestag, including the Leader of the Social Democratic Party Hans-Jochen Vogel.

In the evening, Honecker gave a counter invitation to dinner at the Hotel Bristol, where he delivered a speech with Kohl. Also on 8 September a joint communiqué was published, in which the governments of the FRG and the GDR affirmed their intention "to develop normal good neighborly relations based on equality within the meaning of the Basic Treaty".

=== 9 September ===
On the third day Honecker visited North Rhine-Westphalia. He flew to Nörvenich Air Base by a helicopter provided by the Federal Border Police and then was driven to Düsseldorf, where he with Minister-President Johannes Rau met at Schloss Benrath. With 200 guests with Honecker and Rau during their lunch, where, among other things, Sauerbraten was served. Honecker and Rau agreed at the meeting, in the future, at least every six months to make contact talks especially on environmental protection techniques.

Honecker's journey then led to Essen, where he landed in front of Villa Hügel. In the villa he met with leading representatives of the German economy, including Berthold Beitz, head of the Krupp steel conglomerate) and Carl H. Hahn of Volkswagen. In the Cologne Chamber of Commerce, Honecker met with over 300 representatives of large-scale industry and medium-sized businesses. In Wuppertal, Honecker together with Minister Rau visited the house in which Friedrich Engels had grown up.

=== 10 September ===
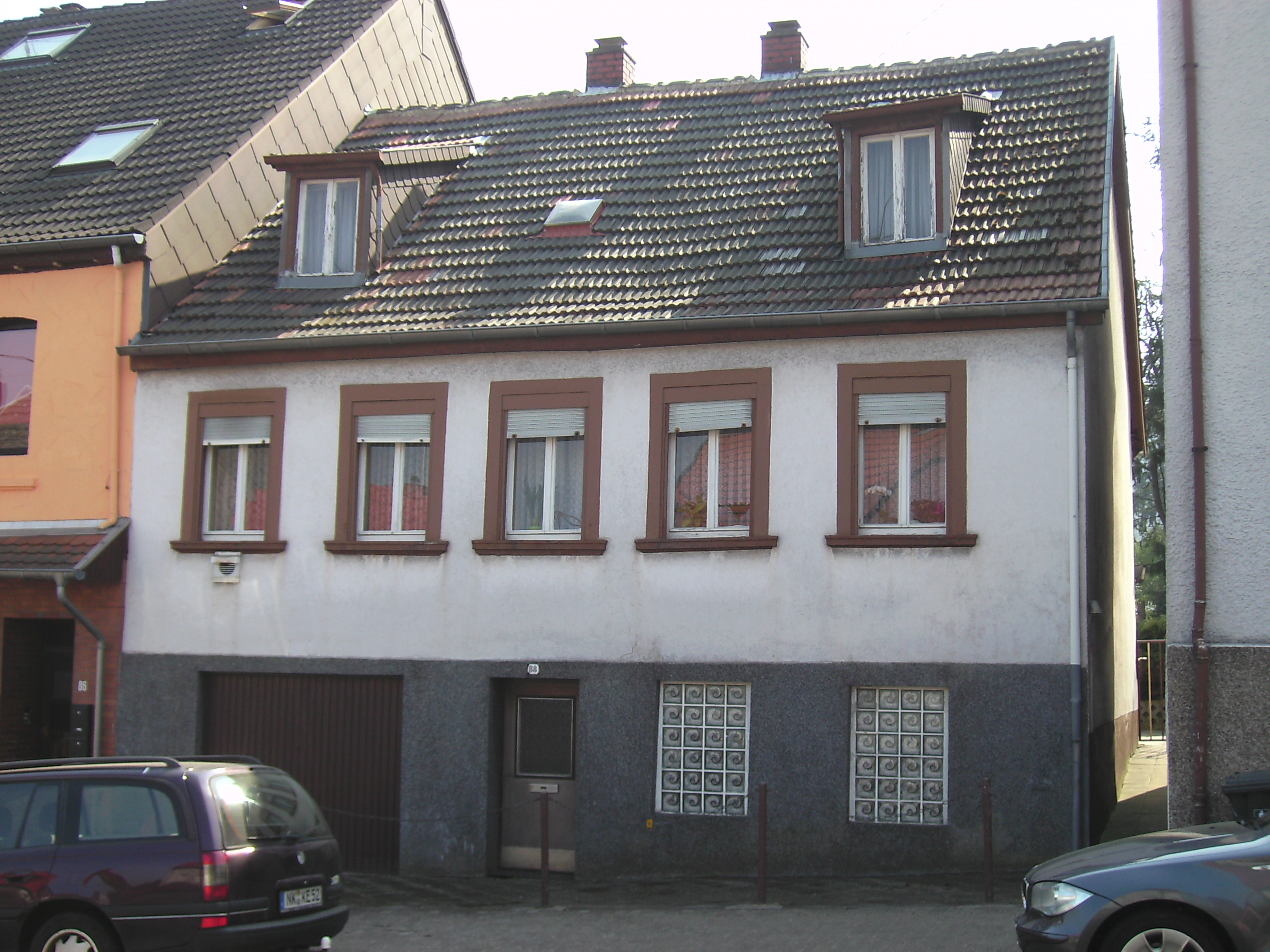
Honecker's childhood home in Wiebelskirchen

On the fourth day of his visit, Honecker went to Trier, where he was received by Minister President of Rhineland-Palatinate Bernhard Vogel in front of the Electoral Palace. With Vogel he then discussed opportunities for economic and cultural relations between the GDR and the state, followed by a working lunch. In the afternoon, Honecker visited the Karl Marx House Museum, the birthplace of Karl Marx and laid down 50 roses there.

From Trier, Honecker traveled via a German Air Force Boeing 707 to Saarland, where he was received at the Saarbrücken Airport by Minister President Oskar Lafontaine with military honours from the German Army and then officially welcomed in the State Chancellery. From there Honecker traveled by motorcade to Neunkirchen, where he visited in the Wiebelskirchen district his younger sister Gertrud Hoppstädter (1917-2010) and the grave of his parents Wilhelm (1881-1969) and Caroline Catharina Honecker (1883-1963). Honecker also met childhood friends. The day after his visit to the city, the Bavarian leader told Honecker the importance of his visit to his hometown, telling him "Maybe it would be a sign of your comprehension if the same desires could be realized by our countrymen", hinting at a policy of the reunification of families.

The visit ended with a reception by the Lord Mayor Neuber in the community center of Neunkirchen. In his speech there, Honecker gave an emotional speech in which he spoke of a day when Germans would no longer be separated by borders. He said specifically:

"The day will come when borders no longer separate us, but unite us, just like the border between the German Democratic Republic and Poland."

After this private part of the visit, Honecker participated in a dinner with Minister President Lafontaine and representatives of the Saarland business and political community at the Dillinger Hütte Casino.

=== 11 September ===
On 11 September 1987, at 11 o'clock in the morning, Honecker left Saarland aboard the same passenger aircraft he used to arrive in the city. Honecker's last day during his visit to the FRG was spent in Munich, Bavaria, where Minister-President of Bavaria Franz Josef Strauss picked him up at Munich-Riem Airport and conferred with him in the Bavarian State Chancellery. Strauss then hosted a lunch in honor of Honecker in the Hall of the Antiquarium in the Munich Residenz, at which about 130 representatives from Bavarian politics and the economic sphere attended. He then visited the Dachau concentration camp where he met with survivors of the camp. After the farewell he was given in the afternoon, Honecker flew from Munich back to East Berlin on a Soviet Ilyushin Il-62, landing at Berlin Schönefeld Airport a short time later.

== Protocol ==
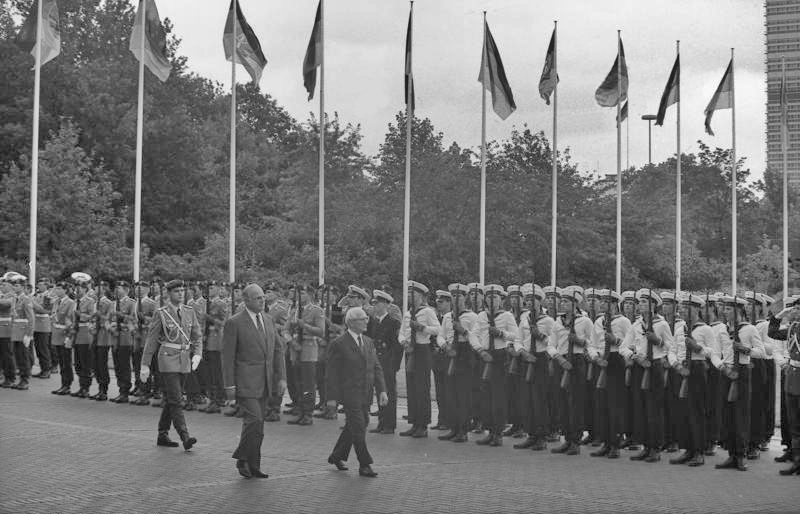
Honecker and Kohl inspecting the guard of honour at the Federal Chancellory.

As the visit was already controversial as it deemed to confirm West Germany's acceptance of East Germany's existence, the former's government went to great lengths to lower its status. The differing views on the significance of Honecker's visit gave diplomatic protocol services particular challenges. While the political leadership of the GDR expected that Honecker would receive customary diplomatic practices in accordance with the internationally recognized institutions, the West Germans tried to avoid such a protocol which would be considered a recognition of the GDR as an independent state and an endorsement of the communist system. Honecker arrived at the chancellery in a Mercedes-Benz 600, where he was treated to a welcoming ceremony. The Wachbataillon from the Federal Ministry of Defence provided the honours for the ceremony and the Staff Band of the Bundeswehr performed Auferstanden aus Ruinen and Deutschlandlied. As a concession to West German concerns, the red carpet was a few feet shorter than usual on official state visits, the motorcycle escort had 17 policemen instead of 21 and the two aforementioned pieces of music played at the military reception were mentioned in the official program merely as "hymns" instead of "national anthems". In accordance with the protocol of the Federal Chancellery, Weizsäcker referred to Honecker as "Mr. General Secretary" instead of "Mr. Chairman" as the latter implies Honecker's head of state status.

== Media reception and West German reactions ==
The visit of Honecker in the Federal Republic enjoyed worldwide attention, with approximately 2,400 journalists were accredited. The "symbolism of the recognition of German dual nationality" dominated the media coverage. Zweites Deutsches Fernsehen (ZDF), a West German television network said his comments in Saarland were "the most important made by Honecker during his visit". A government spokesman reinforced this belief by saying that it "indicated East Germany was moving in the right direction".
