= Masalitina House =

Building in Rostov-on-Don, Russia

- Дом Масалитиной
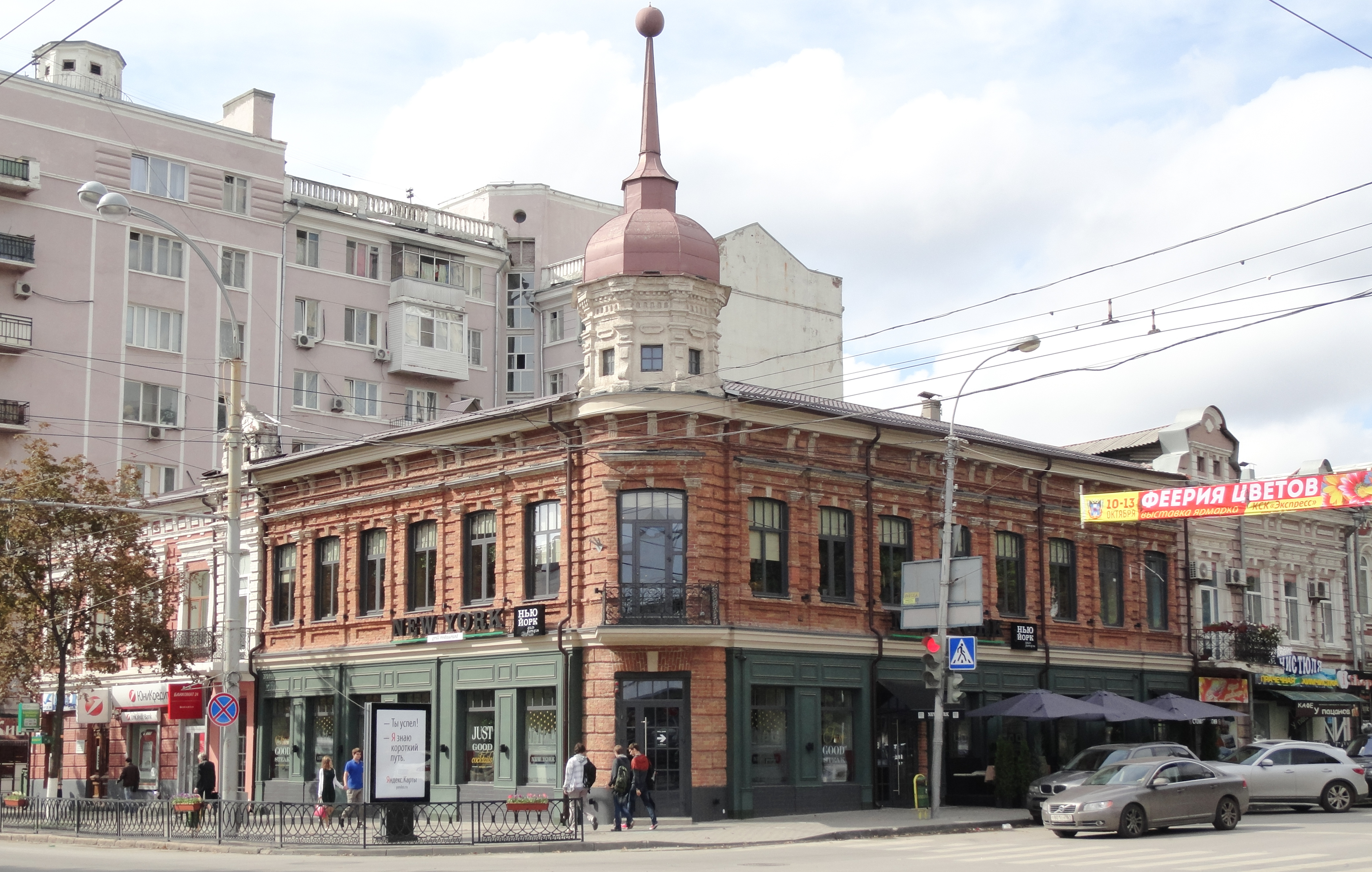
- 47°13′30″N 39°43′49″E
- Location: 113, Bolshaya Sadovaya Street, Rostov-on-Don
- Completion date: 1890

The Masalitina House (Russian: Дом Масалитиной), also known as the Vorozhein House (Russian: Дом Ворожеина) is a building in Rostov-on-Don located at the intersection of Bolshaya Sadovaya Street and Kirovsky Prospekt. It was built in 1890 to the design of architect Grigory Vasilyev in the eclectic style. At the beginning of the 20th century, the house belonged to the merchant P. K. Masalitina. The building is currently occupied by the restaurant "New York". The Masalitina House has the status of an object of cultural heritage of regional significance.

== History ==
The structure was built in 1890 as a revenue house for K. A. Vorozhein, to the design of architect Grigory Vasilyev. By 1913-1914 the house was owned by P. K. Masalitina. It was occupied by a number of companies, including Kh. Mermelstein's haberdashery, N. M. Masalitin's halvah factory, Beytlan and Kyuntselm's sausage factory, N. I. Kravchenko's envelope factory, F. Voloshinova's watch shop, and the Veydenbakh partnership.

In the 1920s after the establishment of the Soviet Union, the house was nationalized. Residential apartments were located on the second floor. During the Great Patriotic War, the corner cupola was lost. It was restored after the war in a simplified form. In the 1950s, the ground floor of the building was occupied by a hairdresser, sweet shop, and a beer shop.

The ownership of the building changed several times during the 1990s-2000s, each of the new owners making changes to the appearance of the building. In the early 2010s, the building was renovated. The builders deviated from the design, and the original colour scheme was altered, the grounfd floor being painted green. On 28 September 2013 a fire broke out in the building.

== Description ==
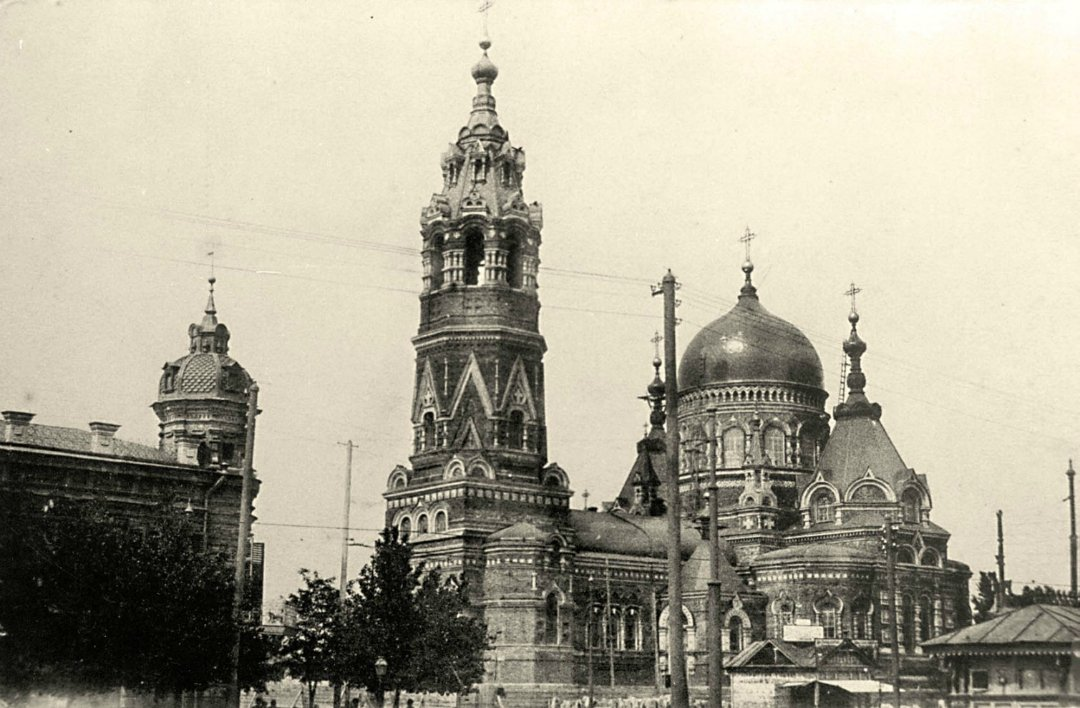
New Church of the Intercession (on the right) and the Masalitina House (at the left) in a pre-revolutionary photo

The mansion occupies the end of the block at the intersection of Bolshaya Sadovaya Street and Kirovsky Prospekt. The building is a two-storey brick structure.

The Masalitina House is built in the eclectic style, its architecture and design combine elements of baroque and classicism. The compositional core of the mansion is a belvedere on the corner, with a cupola and a spire. Originally the dome had a more elaborate design: it was covered with "scales", and there were four dormer windows on the sides. The cupola culminated in an octahedral level, decorated with bas-reliefs in the form of vases. A spire topped with a ball stoof on top of this level.

The facades of the building are decorated in a brick finish. The first floor is rusticated. The main entrances are highlighted with risalits, completed by attics of a complex configuration. Window are decorated with profiled platbands, sandrids and window niches. Among the decorative elements of the building are interfloor traction, decorative brackets, friezes, profiled cornices, and pilasters.
