= Berg house =

Regional type of house found in Bergisches Land, Germany

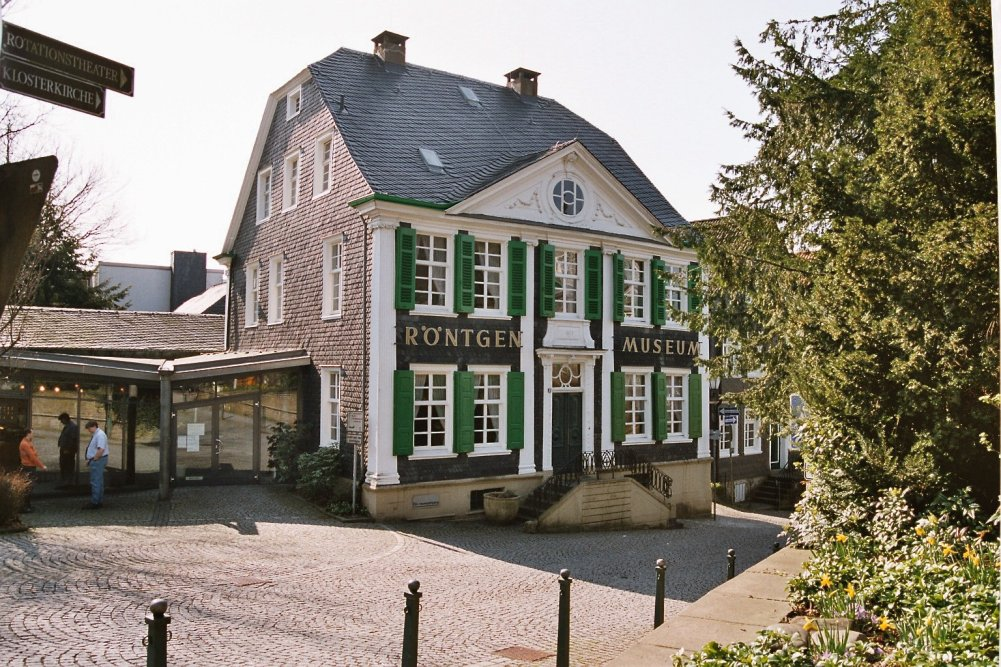
The German X-Ray Museum in Remscheid-Lennep is housed in a fully slate-clad patrician's house in the style of the Bergisches Land

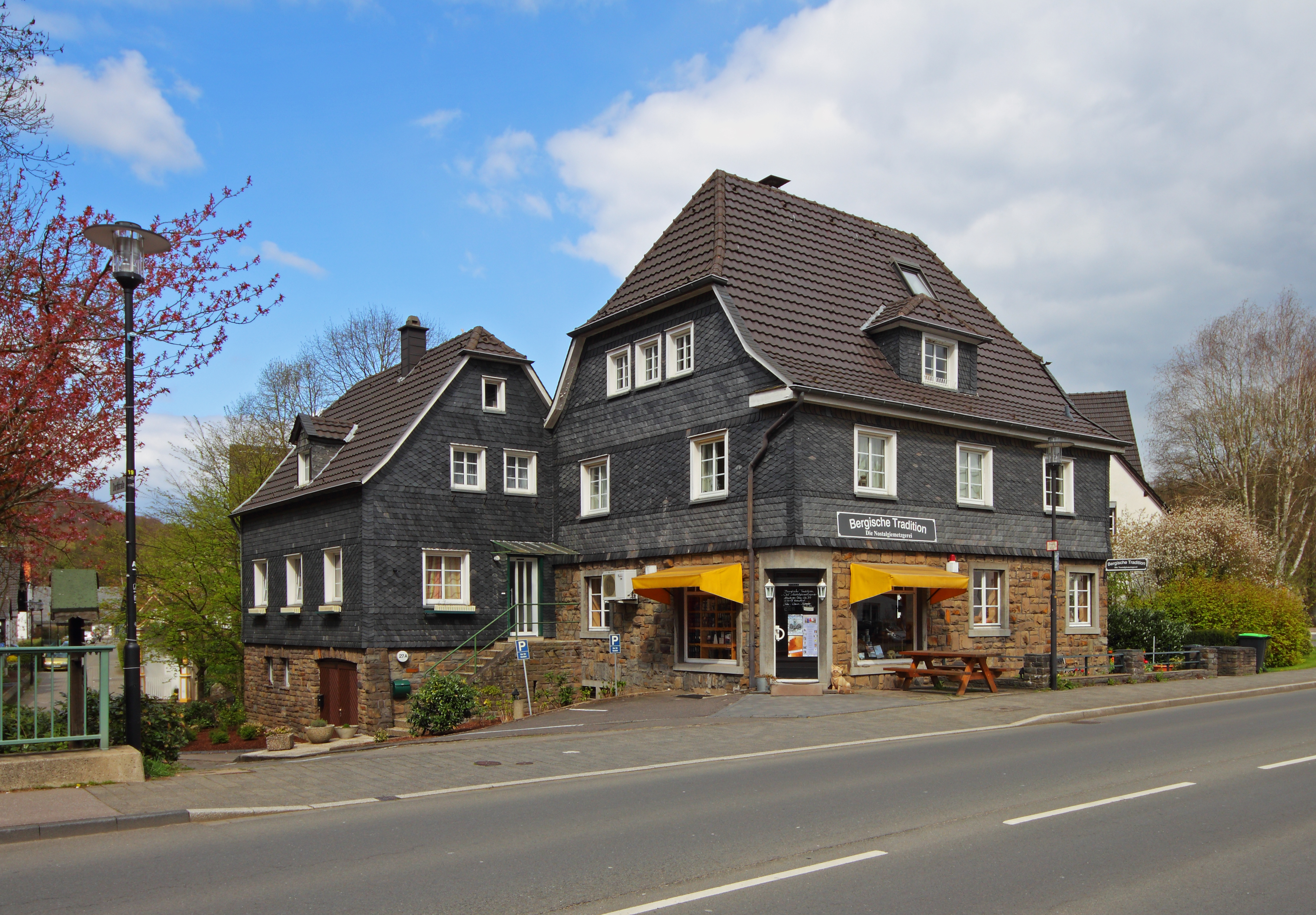
House with a "Bergisch heritage pork butcher's" in Odenthal

The Berg house (German: Bergisches Haus, also Bergischer Dreiklang or Bergische Bauweise) is a type of timber framed house that is widespread in the German region of Bergisches Land. Typical of its timber framed post construction are the green window shutters (Schlagläden in the local dialect), white door lintels and window frames combined with black frame work and white plaster infill, as well as grey-black slate façades and/or rubble stone plinth. A stone staircase often leads to the front door.

== Design ==
The slate façade serves to protect the infill or nogging against the weather and was either applied on the side facing the prevailing wind or on all four sides, depending on the status and wealth of the owner. The slates bear witness to the regional relationship of the houses with the geological unit of the Rhenish Massif, known as the Rhenish Slate Mountains (Rheinisches Schiefergebirge).

On the farmhouse variant (by contrast with the otherwise identical, but slightly larger small town variant), the green timber framed door, with its stable door design (separate upper and lower door), is another feature of the Berg house.

== Movement ==
Around 1900, as part of the heritage conservation movement (Heimatschutzbewegung), attempts were made to collect, preserve and promote examples of what was seen as Bergisch architecture. This was not just based on the rural farmhouse type, which also occurred in the villages in a smaller version, but also typical Bergisch buildings like Schleifkotten ("grinder's cottages"), Hammerkotten ("hammersmith's cottages") or the Bleicherhaus ("bleaching house").

In Bergisch towns, with the exception of the Rhenish parts of the former Duchy of Berg, 2½ to 3½ storey houses built in the period from 1750 to 1850 with features in the Late Baroque/Rococo and Empire styles, heavily dominated local architecture. In 1903, this particular type was proposed and promoted as a prototype to the Bergisch Historical Association (Bergischer Geschichtsverein) by curator of monuments, Paul Clemen, because it seemed more appropriate to contemporary needs. It was only an option in new residential areas on the outskirts of towns, however, because, in the town centres, houses, 4½ to 5½ storeys high, had already been built.

At the same time "Bergisch Rooms" (Bergische Stuben) were created, where traditional furniture was collected and exhibited. Advocates of Bergisch architecture for industrial buildings were Otto Schell and Friedrich Wilhelm Bredt.

== Literature ==
- R. Schmidt-de Bruyn: Das Bergische Patrizierhaus bis 1800. Cologne, 1983
- J. de Jonge: Beschreibung des Bergischen Bürgerhauses. In: Bergische Bauweise, hrsg. v. Ausschuß zur Förderung Bergischer Bauweise, p. 6
- Florian Speer: Heimatschutz-Stil. Anmerkungen zu einem Stilphänomen in der Architektur der Jahrhundertwende. Hausarbeit zum Seminar "Kunst in der Wupperregion". 1994–95

== Examples ==
- Engels-Haus
