= Karl Marx statue =

Statue of Karl Marx in Trier

Coordinates: 49°45′34″N 6°38′34″E

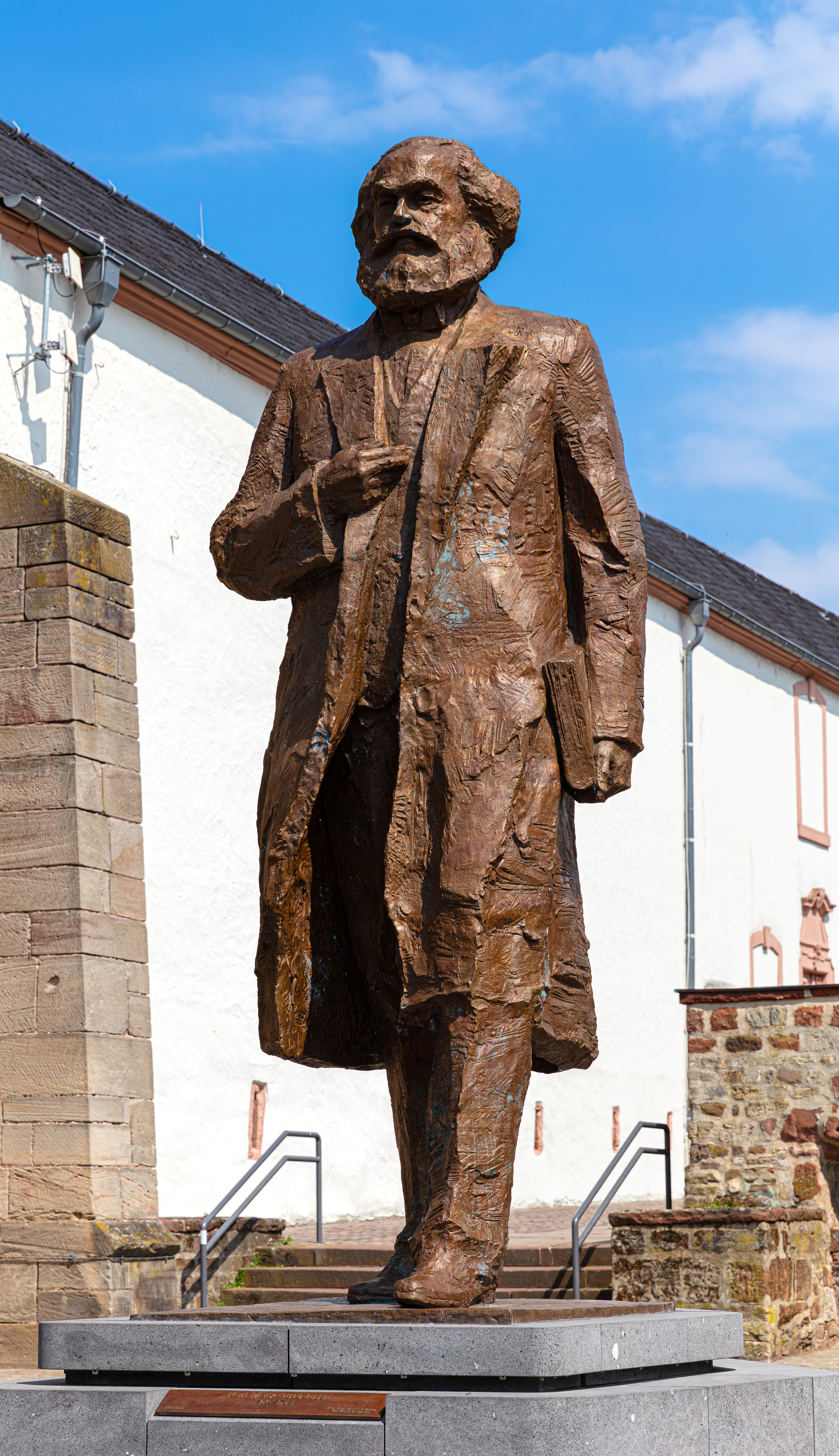
The Karl Marx statue in Trier (2018)

The Karl Marx statue is a monument located on Simeonstiftplatz in Trier, Rhineland-Palatinate, Germany. It was unveiled on May 5, 2018, to mark the 200th anniversary of Karl Marx's birth in his hometown. The work by sculptor Wu Weishan is a gift from the People's Republic of China.

== Description ==
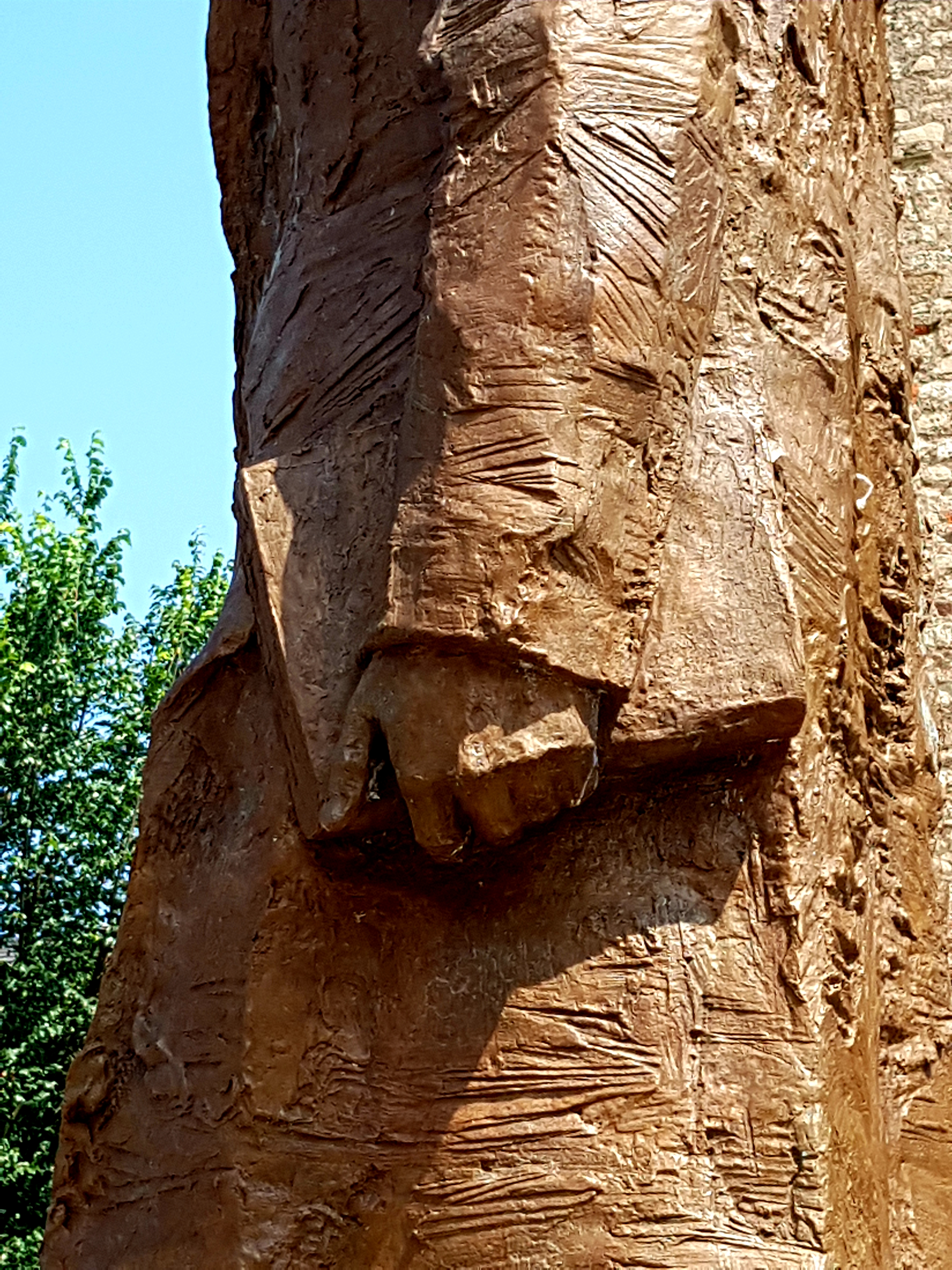
Surface structure, detail: left hand holding a book symbolizing the advancement of humanity (2018)

The bronze statue weighs 2.3 tons and, including its base, is 5.50 meters high, an allusion to Marx's birth date of May 5, 1818. The pentagonal base is made of concrete clad with basalt slabs, while the statue itself is made of bronze.

The figure depicts Marx in his later years striding forward with a book in his left hand. Wu gave him the book as a symbol of the advancement of humanity. Marx's right hand reaches for the lapel of his frock coat. His gaze is directed into the distance, his chin slightly protruding, his brow furrowed.

The five corners of the stepped base point to the cities where Marx worked or to which he had a special connection: Trier, Berlin, Hamburg as the seat of his publisher Otto Meissner, Paris and finally London.

According to the artist's description, the statue is based on "Western realism," which was prevalent in Marx's time, combined with "Chinese impressionism." Elsewhere he wrote: "The statue is modeled in the modern Chinese freehand expressionist Xieyi style, which not only accurately and subtly represents the figure of Karl Marx, but also strives to depict his intellectual world!"

Wu's intention was to depict Marx in all his grandeur, with a determined gaze. The long hair and coat were meant to embody his wisdom. During the creation process, Wu explained what the work should show: "Karl Marx's thoughts revolve around the world. He is convinced that everything is in motion and changing." Wu chose to show Marx moving forward in order to demonstrate his significance not only in his time but also for the future.

== Background ==
Originally, the 200th anniversary of Marx's birth was to be used as an occasion to erect a life-size monument in front of the Karl Marx House, his birthplace, which the People's Republic of China intended to donate. Then China announced a much larger statue, for which there would not have been enough space in front of the building. So another location had to be found.

Wu himself pointed out to readers of the China Daily in a preview of the monument's unveiling that such a project required social participation in Germany. He explained that before a monument is erected in a public space, there are repeated discussions in the media and a parliamentary decision. The monument was controversial before its installation. The city council debated whether to accept a gift from China created by a state-affiliated artist. Wu is a member of the Chinese Communist Party and one of the artists favored by the state for politically important statues. It was referred to as a "poisoned gift" in Trier's city council; accepting it would honor the donor, something the Chinese Communist Party did not deserve. A majority of the SPD, CDU, the Left Party, and parts of the Green Party voted in favor of the monument, while a minority from the Green Party, the FDP, and the AfD rejected the proposal.

=== Costs ===
The People's Republic of China covered the costs of producing the monument, its base, and transporting it from China to Trier. The city of Trier covered the costs of the earthworks, foundation, paving, and lighting, amounting to €39,000. The monument cost a total of €92,500.

=== Gifting as part of Chinese foreign policy ===
These and other gifts of Marx and Engels statues are seen as part of a new Chinese foreign policy under Xi Jinping, the General Secretary of the Chinese Communist Party since 2012. China aims to enhance its prestige, rather than simply promoting infrastructure projects in Eastern Europe and Africa as in the past, to expand its global influence, and to assume the leadership role it believes it is finally entitled to due to its economic strength.

The Engels monument in Wuppertal is also a gift from China. The city did not prevail against China's wishes to depict Friedrich Engels as a young revolutionary, life-size, rather than larger-than-life and as an old man. However, they did succeed in preventing Engels from being placed on a pedestal.

== Unveiling ==
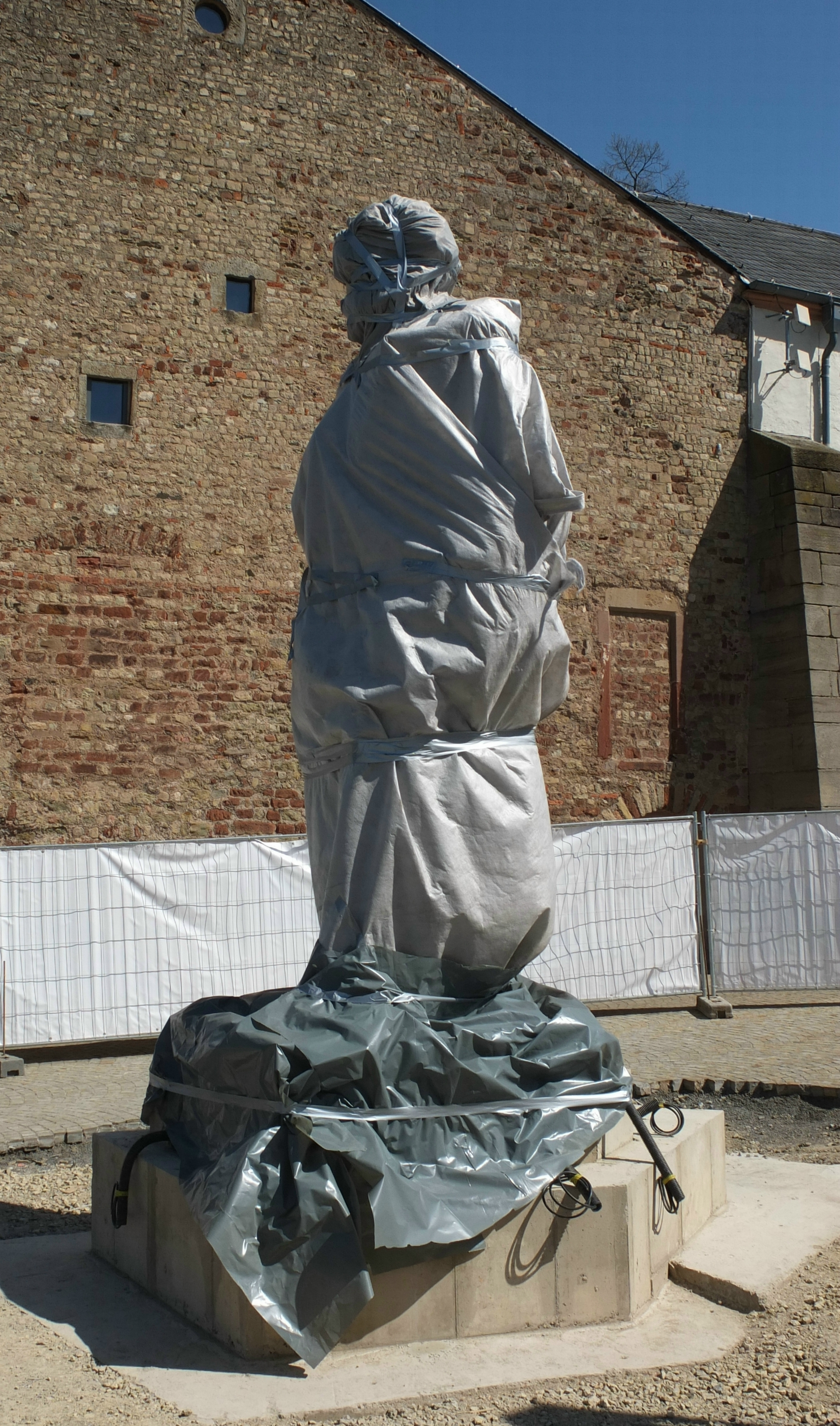
The statue was shrouded before its unveiling (2018).

Numerous dignitaries attended the unveiling on May 5, 2018. Speakers included Mayor Wolfram Leibe, Trier's Head of Construction Andreas Ludwig, Rhineland-Palatinate's Minister-President Malu Dreyer, Shi Mingde, Chinese Ambassador to Berlin, Guo Weimin, Vice Minister of the Information Bureau of the State Council of the People's Republic of China, and the statue's creator, sculptor Wu Weishan.

=== Reactions ===
Before the unveiling of the memorial, Ralf Nestmeyer, Vice President and Writers-in-Prison Officer of PEN Germany, wrote an open letter to Trier's Mayor Wolfram Leibe. Nestmeyer called for the memorial to remain ununveiled until the Chinese poet and painter Liu Xia, widow of Nobel Peace Prize laureate Liu Xiaobo, was released from house arrest and allowed to leave China. Liu Xia was placed under house arrest in 2010; she is an honorary member of PEN Germany.

Historian Hubertus Knabe, director of the Berlin-Hohenschönhausen Memorial, spoke out against the erection of a "colossal statue" in Trier. He argued that such statues were typical of monarchies and dictatorships, not democracies. He stated that for many victims of communism, it was difficult to bear the idea of such a monument being erected again in a West German city. Ulrich Delius of the Society for Threatened Peoples, like Trier city politicians, referred to it as a "poisoned gift," as it came from a country that perpetrated state terror against its own population.

On the day of the unveiling, several demonstrations took place in Trier. Activists from the Falun Gong movement, which is banned in China, held a vigil. A demonstration organized by an alliance of left-wing groups and the German Communist Party (DKP) was held under the motto "A sign against capitalism and exploitation." The Alternative for Germany (AfD) held a silent protest to commemorate the victims of communism. There was also another demonstration against the AfD's appearance.

On May 10, 2018, a banner attached to the statue was set on fire; the fire brigade extinguished the blaze. According to the police, no further damage was caused.
