= Karl Marx Monument, Chemnitz =

Monument in Chemnitz

Coordinates: 50°50′9″N 12°55′24″E

Karl Marx Monument
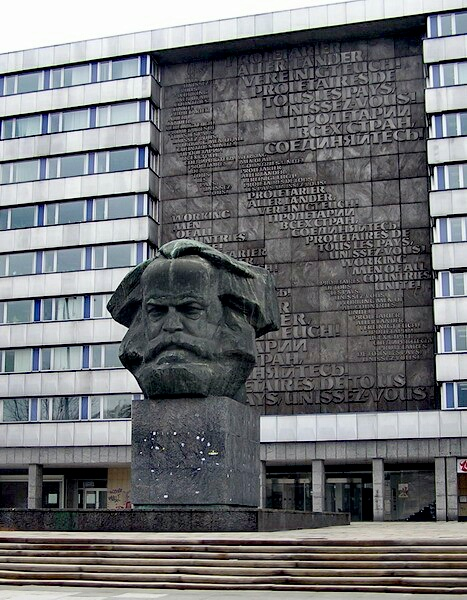
- Karl-Marx-Monument in Chemnitz
- Interactive map of Karl Marx Monument
- Location: Chemnitz
- Designer: Lev Kerbel
- Type: Stylized head
- Material: Bronze
- Height: 7.10 m (23.3 ft)
- Beginning date: 10 May 1953
- Opening date: 9 October 1971
- Dedicated to: Karl Marx

The Karl Marx Monument (German: Karl-Marx-Monument) is a 7.10-metre-tall (23-foot-4-inch) stylized head of Karl Marx in Chemnitz, Germany. The heavy-duty sculpture, together with the base platform, stand over 13 m (43 ft) tall and weighs approximately 40 tonnes. On a wall just behind the monument, the phrase "Workers of the world, unite!" (from the Communist Manifesto) is inscripted in four languages: German, English, French and Russian.

It is the most famous monument in the inner city of Chemnitz, where it has gained the nickname "Nischel", which is derived from the Saxon term for head or skull.

== History ==
After renaming the city and the district of Chemnitz to Karl-Marx-Stadt on 10 May 1953 for Karl Marx Year, the East German government decided to honour the namesake of the city, and hired a Soviet sculptor, Lev Kerbel, to design a monument.

The monument was cast in the art foundry Monument Skulptura in Leningrad in bronze and then broken down into 95 pieces. In Karl-Marx-Stadt, these items were to be welded together again, but the Soviet technology was not suitable. Instead, it was decided to transfer the job to the VEB Germania. The monument stands on two pedestals with Korninskij granite, named after the mining region in southern Ukraine.

On 9 October 1971, the monument was inaugurated before a crowd of around 250,000 people along Karl-Marx-Allee (popularly referred to as "Nischelgasse" ("Skull Alley"), today's Brückenstraße).

As the landmark of the city, it served during holidays in the German Democratic Republic as a backdrop for pageants and other mass events. The monument remained intact after German reunification, although the proposed demolition of the monument led to a heated debate when Karl-Marx-Stadt returned to its former name of Chemnitz. Many other cities around the world at that time reported interest in buying the monument; there have been discussions about a sale to Cologne.

Until 2007, the motto of the city was "Stadt mit Köpfchen" (the city with heads/brains), referring to the monument.

== See also ==
- List of statues of Karl Marx
- List of statues of Vladimir Lenin
- List of statues of Joseph Stalin
