= Engels-Haus =

Museum in Wuppertal, Germany

Coordinates: 51°15′59″N 7°11′27″E

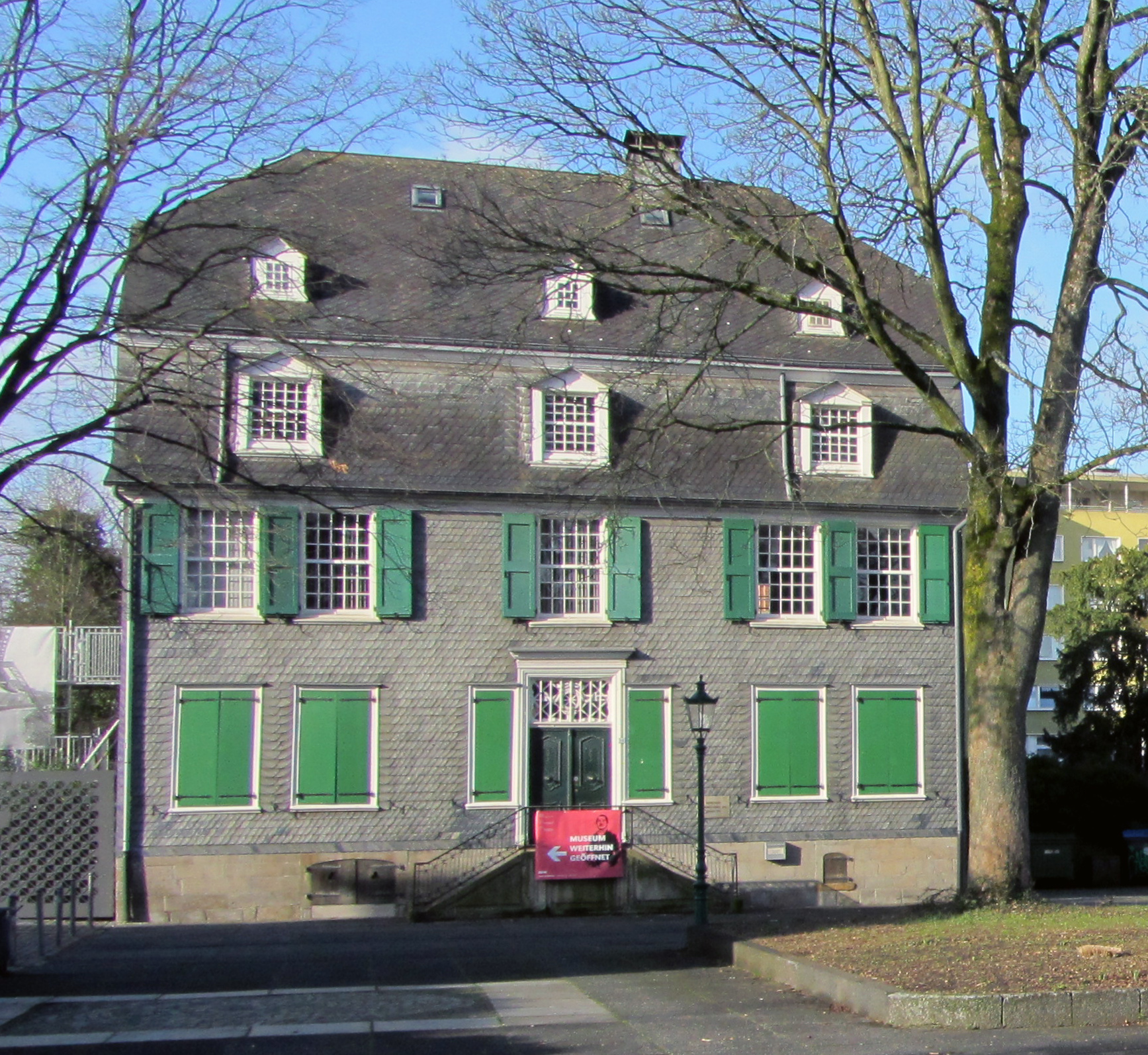
Engels-Haus in 2017

Engels-Haus is a museum in Wuppertal, Germany, of the house where German philosopher and political theorist Friedrich Engels (1820–1895) grew up. The museum is a constituent member of the Museum of Industrial Culture in Wuppertal.

The late baroque Berg house was built in 1775 by Eberhard Haarmann in what was then Barmen, Berg. The father of Engels, Friedrich Engels Sr, was born in the house in 1796. Engels himself was born in a different house owned by the family approximately 100 m (330 ft) to the east that was destroyed in World War II but spent his youth growing up at Engels-Haus.

The museum was opened in 1970 on the 150th anniversary of Engels' birth and became a popular tourist destination for citizens of communist and socialist countries. The museum was closed in 2016 for refurbishment. The museum's planned reopening in 2020 for the 200th anniversary of Engels' birth was cancelled owing to the COVID-19 pandemic. Nevertheless, in the presence of the Minister for Culture and Science of the State of North Rhine-Westphalia, Isabel Pfeiffer-Poensgen, and more than 300 guests, the museum was reopened with the new permanent exhibition on the life and work of Friedrich Engels on 11 September 2021. The highlight of this event was the unveiling of the international art project Inside out Engels.

Noteworthy for visitors to the house is the nearby pedestrian crossing from the Adlerbrücke station, the traffic lights of which feature the face of a young Friedrich Engels.

== See also ==
- Museum Industriekultur Wuppertal
- Friedrich Engels
- Karl Marx House
