= Monument to Sergey Kirov =

- Russian: Памятник Сергею Мироновичу Кирову
- Interactive map of Monument to Sergey Kirov
- Location: Rostov-on-Don, Rostov Oblast, Russia
- Coordinates: 47°08′03″N 39°26′03″E
- Builder: Zinovy Vilensky (sculptor); Viktor Barinov (architect)
- Material: bronze
- Opening date: 1939

Monument to Sergey Kirov (Russian: Памятник Сергею Мироновичу Кирову) is a monument in the city of Rostov-on-Don, Rostov Oblast, Russia. It was opened in 1939.

== Description ==
The monument was created by sculptor Zinovy Vilensky and architect Viktor Barinov. The bronze figure with a raised right hand is set on a high pedestal made of red granite. Kirov is depicted with a kind smile and a cheerful face. On the pedestal there is inscribed a quote from the speech of Kirov, deliver at the 17th Congress of the All-Union Communist Party (Bolsheviks): "Our successes are truly tremendous. The devil knows – to put it humanly, one wants just to live and live..."

== History ==
Sergei Mironovich Kirov was in Rostov in the spring of 1918. Then he participated in the First Congress of Soviets of the Don Republic.

The Monument to Kirov was opened on April 30, 1939. The monument was installed in the park, which was named after Kirov as well. Earlier in this square stood the Church of the Intercession, which was demolished in 1930. According to a city legend, the marble slabs remaining from the church were used as a material for the monument.

During the Great Patriotic War, the inhabitants of Rostov savedthe monument from destruction and buried it. Already in 1945 the monument was restored again.

The Monument to Kirov was previously declared an object of cultural heritage of Federal significance, but in 1997 its status was reduced to of Local significance.

In 2003 the Cossack Society "Don Cossack Host" wished to restore the Church of the Intercession at Kirov Square and move the monument to another place. This proposal was supported by Archbishop Panteleimon of Rostov and Novocherkassk. Members of CPRF and representatives of the Rostov branch of All-Russian Society for the Protection of Monuments of History and Culture were against this idea. Public hearings were appointed, and as a result, it was decided to move the monument to the square which is situated at the corner of Kirovsky Avenue and Pushkinskaya Street.

In October 2005, the monument to Kirov was dismantled and moved to a workshop for restoration. In December of the same year, the monument was set in the new place.
