= Karl Marx Monument (Rostov-on-Don) =

- Russian: Памятник Карлу Марксу
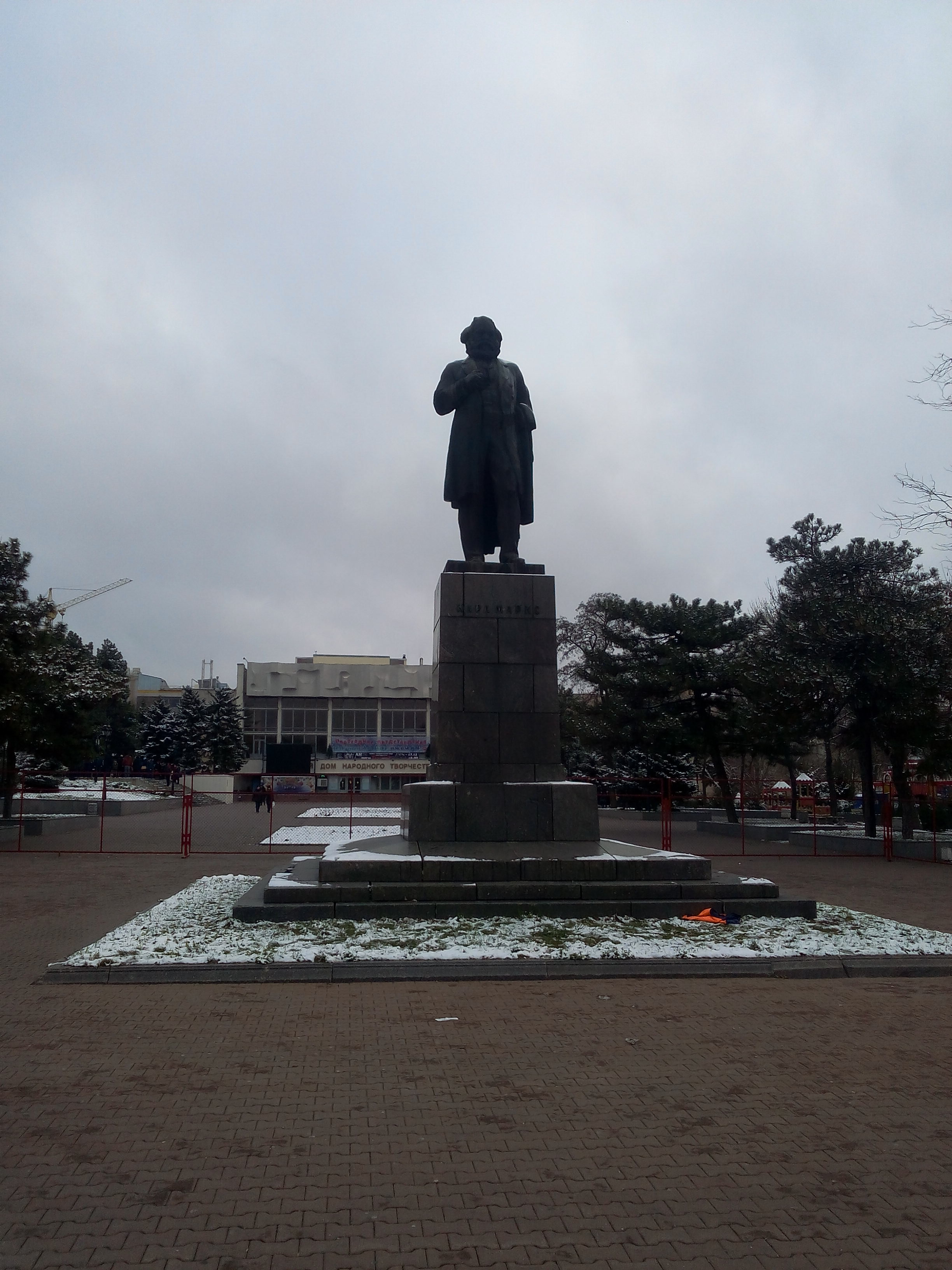
- Interactive map of Karl Marx Monument
- Location: Rostov-on-Don, Rostov Oblast, Russia
- Coordinates: 47°08′06″N 39°27′16″E
- Opening date: 1959

Monument to Karl Marx (Russian: Памятник Карлу Марксу) is a monument situated at Karl Marx Square in the city of Rostov-on-Don, Rostov Oblast, Russia. It was installed in 1959 at the site of the old Karl Marx Monument, which was destroyed during World War II. It is officially declared as an object of Cultural heritage of Russia.

== History ==
The monument to Karl Marx was opened on June 28, 1925 at the central square of Nakhichevan-on-Don (now part of the Proletarsky district of Rostov-on-Don). The monument was installed on the pedestal of the Monument to Catherine II, which was earlier demolished by the Bolsheviks. The square around the monument later was also named after Karl Marx.

The old sculpture was cast by Dvigatel Technical Association. The author of the monument was sculptor Vladimir Bibaev. The right hand of Marx was laid over the side of his coat, while the left one rested on a pile of books. On the pedestal there was a memorial plaque with the inscription: "The monument was built by the workers of Nakhichevan district according to the resolution of the 2nd broad working conference issued on November 23, 1924".

During the Great Patriotic War, the monument was destroyed by the troops of the Wehrmacht who captured the city: the sculpture was shot from a tank. After the war, a smaller version of the monument was erected on the square. The memorial plaque from the old monument had been preserved and was transferred to a Rostov museum. The surviving part of the pedestal was moved to the square near the Rostov Cinema (it is situated opposite the Rostov State University) and Mikhail Lomonosov sculpture was installed on it.

The existing monument was constructed at Karl Marx Square in 1959. The authors of the monument were sculptor Moisey Altshuler and architect Mikail Minkus. The bronze figure of Marx was mounted on a high granite pedestal and was cast in Leningrad.

The monument to Karl Marx was earlier declared as an object of cultural heritage of Federal significance, but in 1997 its status was reduced to of Local significance.

In the late 1990s, representatives of the local Armenian diaspora wished to restore the Monument to Catherine II at the same place, but this initiative did not gain enough support. The issue of transfer of Karl Marx Monument and the restoration of the Monument to Catherine II again began to be actively discussed in 2005, when a Monument to Sergey Kirov was moved to Rostov-on-Don. According to surveys, against the transfer of the Monument to Marx was the majority of the inhabitants of Proletarsky District. According to preliminary estimates, the work on the transfer of the monument would cost 1 million rubles. According to one of the projects, the monument to Marx can be moved to the corner of Sholokhov Avenue and the 20th Line. In 2014, the communist public movement "The Essence of Time" collected 1500 signatures and presented them to the Governor of the Rostov Oblast and spoke against the transfer of the monument.
