= Statue of Friedrich Engels, Manchester =

Statue of Friedrich Engels in Manchester, England

Statue of Friedrich Engels
- Пам'ятник Ф.Енгельсу
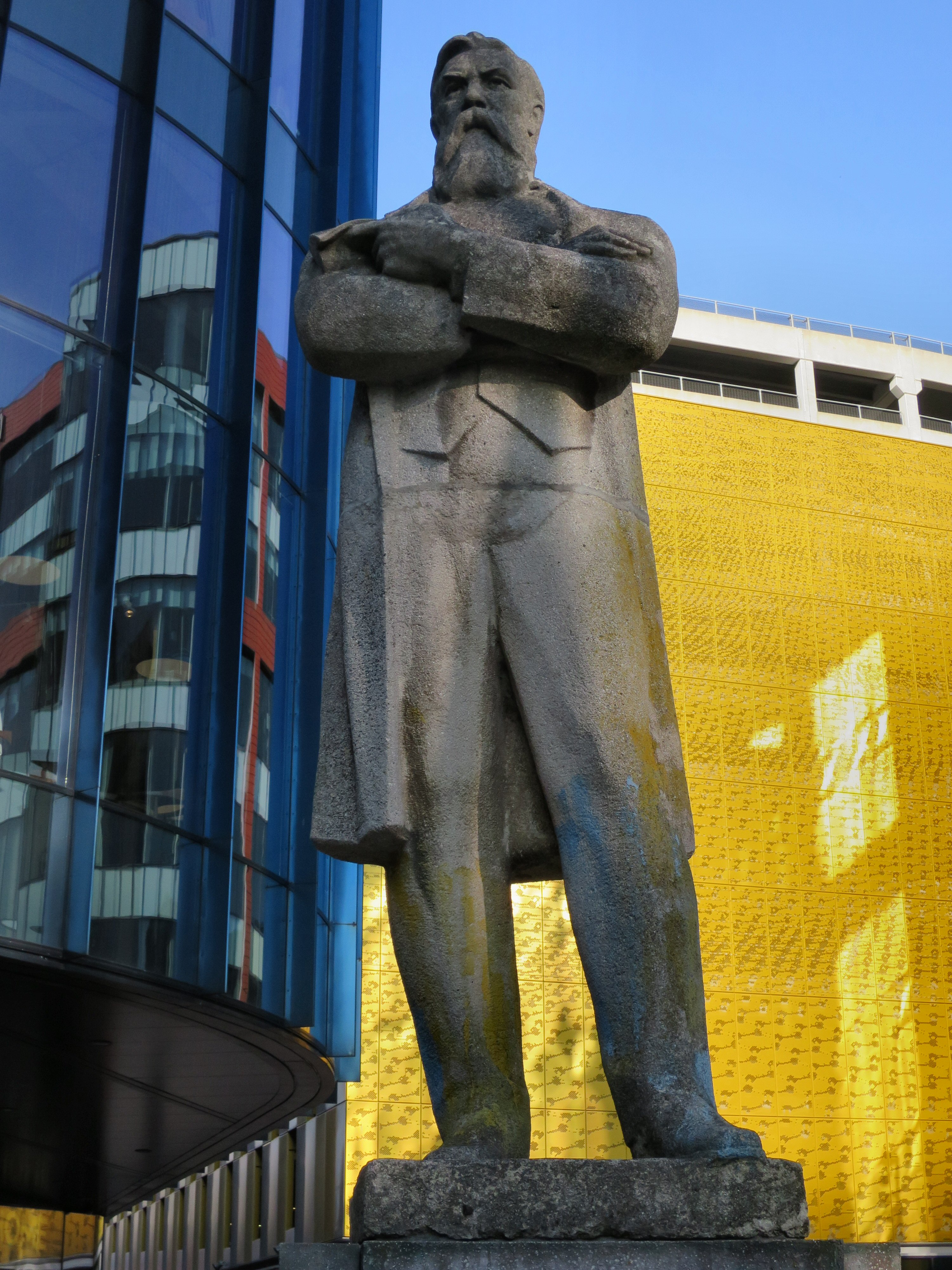
- Interactive map of Statue of Friedrich Engels
- Location: Tony Wilson Place, Manchester, United Kingdom
- Coordinates: 53°28′24″N 2°14′49″W
- Type: Statue
- Material: Concrete
- Height: 3.7 m (12 ft)
- Completion date: ~1970s
- Restored date: 2017
- Dedicated to: Friedrich Engels

The statue of Friedrich Engels is a 12 ft (3.7 m) concrete statue of German philosopher Friedrich Engels currently located at Tony Wilson Place in Manchester, England.

The Soviet-era statue depicts Engels in a standing pose with his arms crossed, and stands on a pedestal bearing the Cyrillic inscription "Ф. ЭНГЕЛЬС" ("F. ENGELS").

== History ==
First constructed in the 1970s, the statue was originally installed in the village of Mala Pereschepyna in the Poltava Oblast of the Ukrainian SSR. In 2015 Ukraine passed a series of laws that outlawed the public display of Soviet symbols, and the statue was consequently removed from its original position and discarded in a field, having been cut in half at the waist.

The removal of so many Soviet-era monuments in Ukraine prompted the artist Phil Collins to begin searching for a statue of Engels to bring to Manchester, the city in which Engels had been living when he wrote The Condition of the Working Class in England between 1842 and 1844. After two years of searching for a suitable statue of Engels, Collins discovered the statue in its abandoned state and after eight months of negotiations was able to secure permission to transport the statue to England.

The statue was temporarily displayed at several locations across Europe on the journey to England. It was unveiled in its new location in front of HOME on the last day of the 2017 Manchester International Festival.

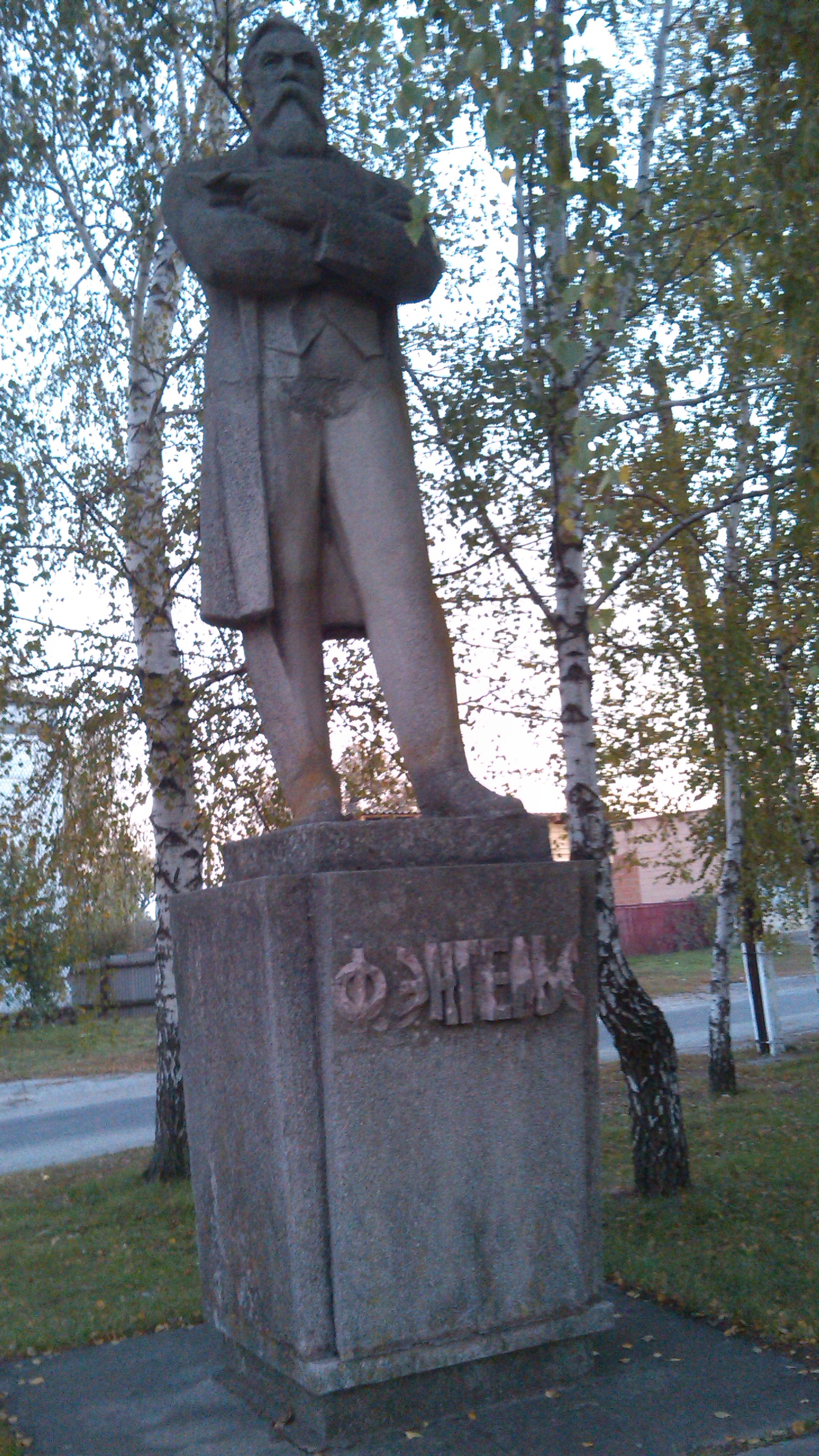
The statue in its original location in Poltava Oblast, Ukraine

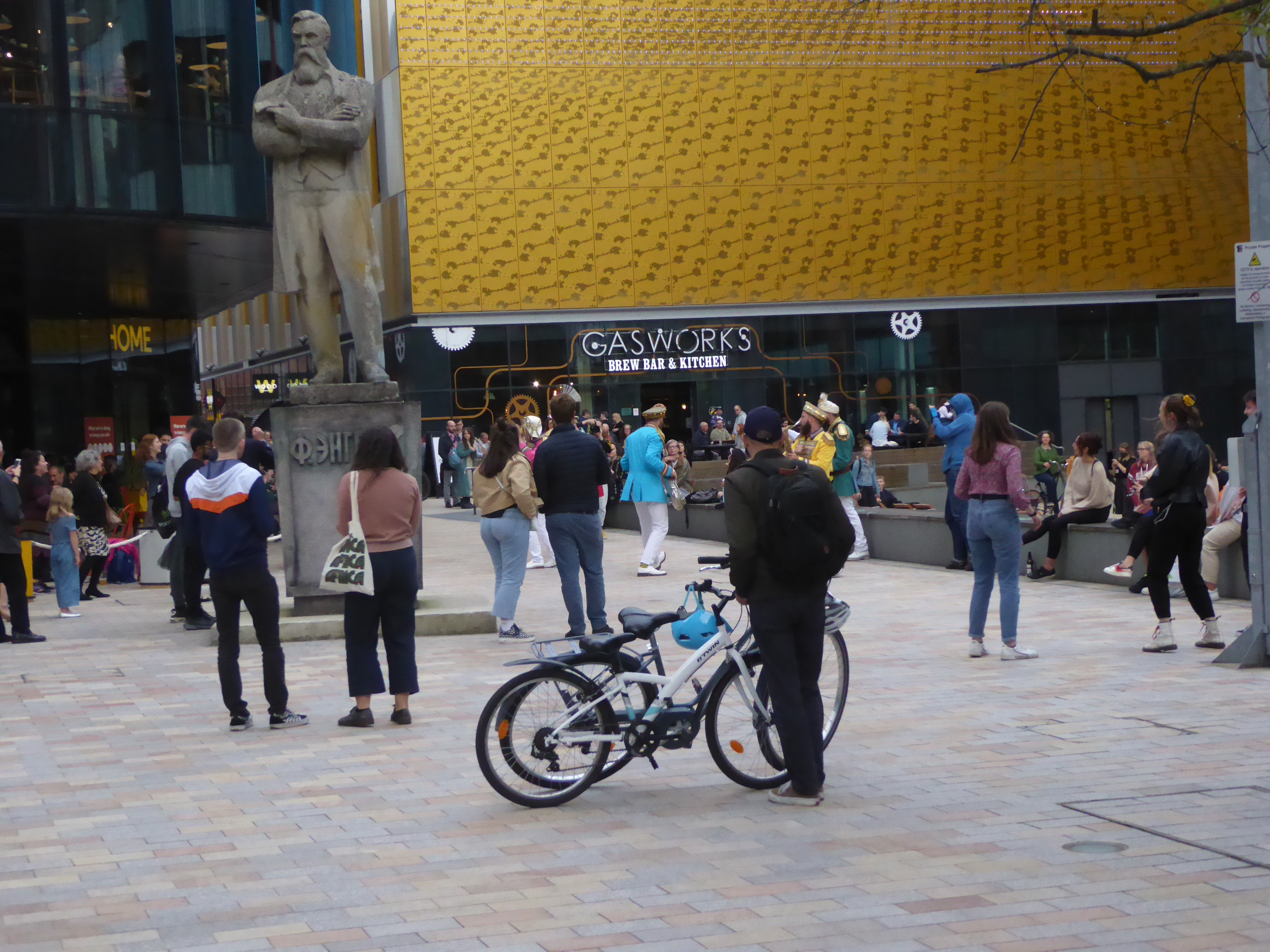
The statue in its current location on Tony Wilson Place, Manchester

== See also ==
- Monument to Friedrich Engels (Moscow)
- List of statues of Karl Marx
