= Lev Kerbel =

Russian sculptor

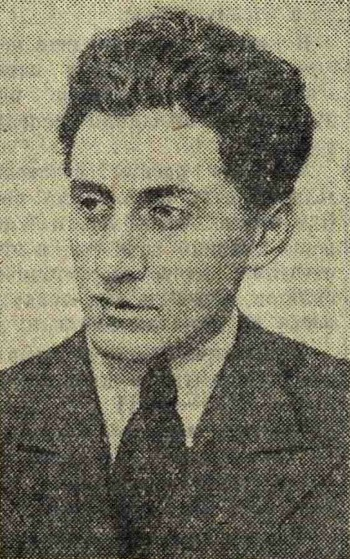
- Born: November 7, 1917; Semyonovka, Chernigov Governorate, Russian Republic
- Died: August 14, 2003 (aged 86); Moscow, Russia
- Citizenship: Soviet
- Education: Moscow Surikov State Academic Institute of Fine Arts; Repin Institute of Arts
- Style: Socialist realism

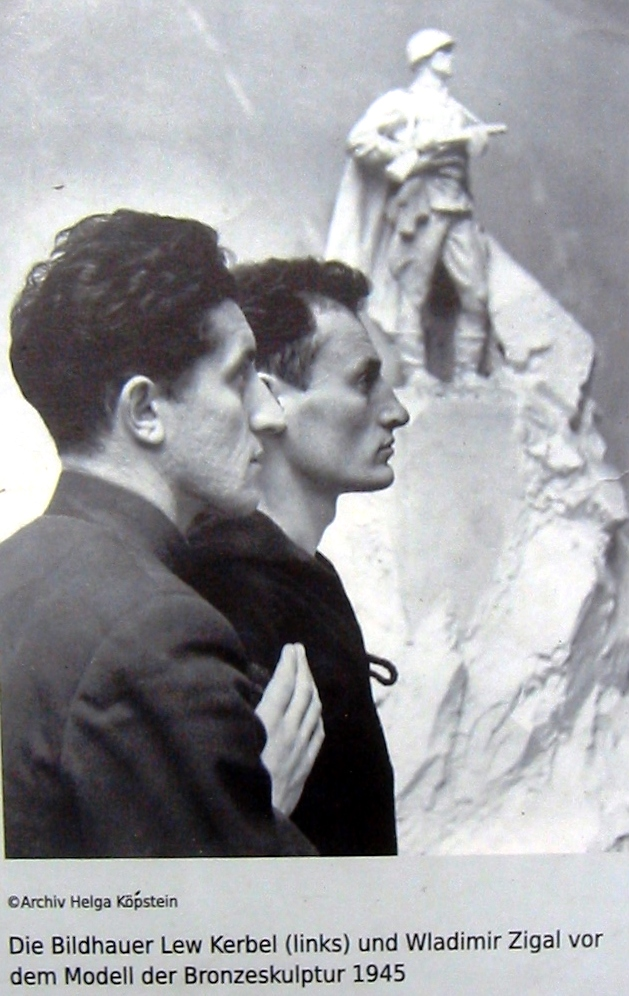
Kerbel (left) together with fellow Soviet sculptor Vladimir Tsigal, 1945

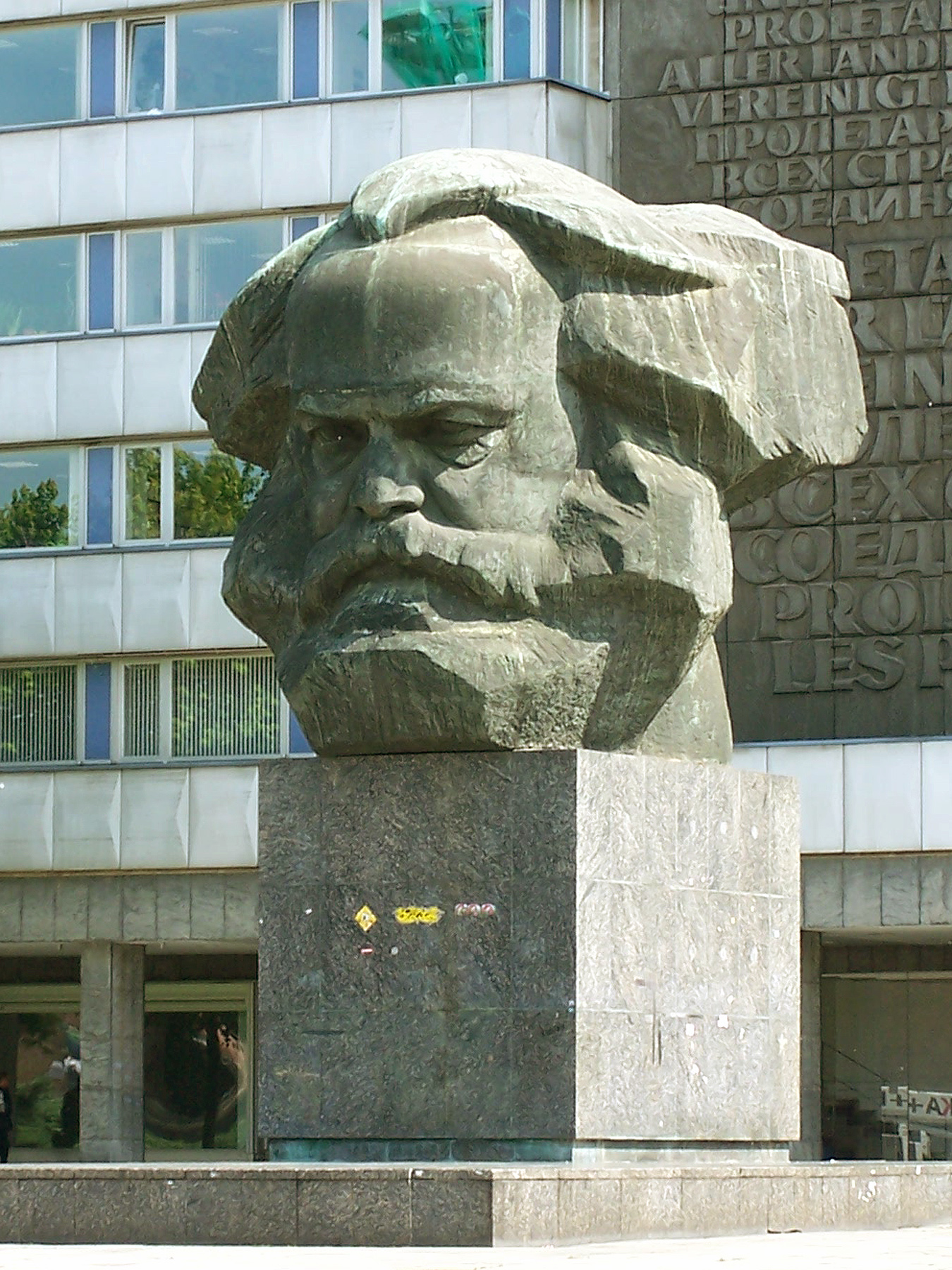
Lev Kerbel's monumental bust of Karl Marx in Chemnitz, Germany

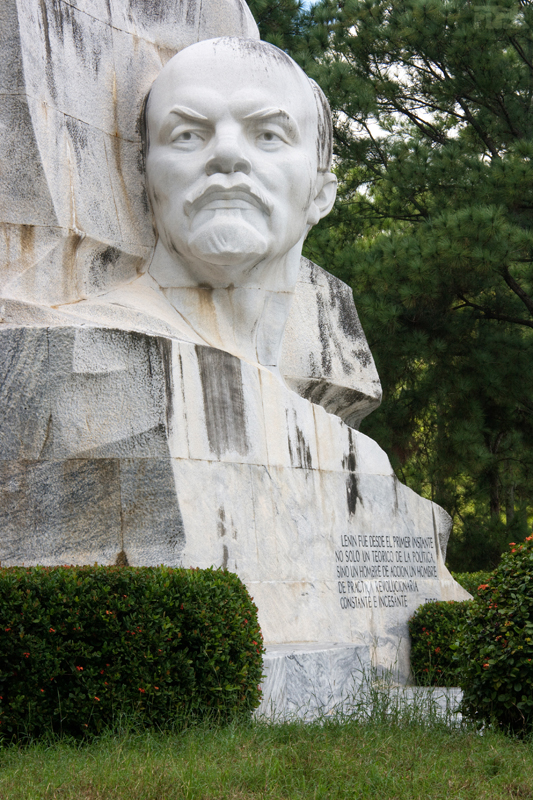
The Lenin Monument in Parque Lenin, Havana, Cuba (1984, sculptor: Lev Kerbel; architect: A. Quintana)

Lev Yefimovich Kerbel (Russian: Лев Ефимович Кербель; 7 November [O.S. 25 October] 1917 – 14 August 2003) was a Soviet and Russian sculptor of socialist realist works. Kerbel's creations included statues of Karl Marx, Vladimir Lenin, Yuri Gagarin, which were sent by Soviet Government as gifts to socialist and the Third World countries across the world.

Kerbel was born to a Jewish family in the village of Semyonovka in Chernigov Governorate, Russian Republic (currently Semenivka, Chernihiv Oblast, Ukraine), on the day that the Winter Palace in Petrograd was stormed by the Bolsheviks. Lev's family moved to the Smolensk region, where he began sculpting as a child. He continued to sculpt and in 1934 he won an award from the Komsomol (Young Communist League) for a plaque of Lenin.

During World War II, Kerbel helped build the defenses for the Battle of Moscow, then served in the Northern Fleet, gaining renown as a military artist.

After the war, Kerbel's career took off with a wide range of commissions. In 1958 he sculpted a statue in Shanghai that depicted a huge Soviet and an equally large Chinese worker hand in hand. When Soviet-Chinese relations foundered a few years later, the statue was torn down by a mob.

In the 1950s to 1970s, Kerbel sculpted many portraits of Soviet and foreign intellectuals: writer Boris Lavrenyov and violinist David Oistrakh, Canadian clergyman James Gareth Endicott, Giacomo Manzù (sculptor) and Pietro Orgento (orchestral conductor) from Italy and many others. Another example of Kerbel's sculptures is the Lenin Monument in the Parque Lenin area of Havana, Cuba. In 1976 the Council of Ministers of the Soviet Union presented the Government of Sri Lanka the monument of Solomon Bandaranaike, the late Prime minister of the country, carved by Lev Kerbel.

While some people dismiss Kerbel's works as a form of flat Communist propaganda, Kerbel himself said that he was always more interested in art than politics. Many people now view his few remaining statues with nostalgia, particularly in Chemnitz, where his bust of Karl Marx is referred to as 'the head'. Among the monuments on the graves of the Soviet soldiers carefully preserved in Germany are Kerbel sculptures in Berlin and on Seelow Heights.

In the 1990s following the collapse of the socialist bloc many of his works of art were destroyed. However, his enormous Karl Marx Monument has been preserved as a cultural monument. One of Kerbel's last works was the memorial to the crew of the Kursk submarine, inaugurated in Moscow on August 12, 2002.

== Honours and awards ==
- Hero of Socialist Labour (1985)
- Order "For Merit to the Fatherland", 3rd class (5 November 1997) – for services to the state and personal contribution to the development of the national fine arts
- Order of Friendship of Peoples (6 May 1993) – for the great achievements in art, to strengthen international cultural relations and fruitful pedagogical activity
- Order of Lenin
- Order of the Red Banner of Labour
- Order of the Patriotic War, 2nd class
- Order of the Red Star
- Lenin Prize (1962) – a monument to Karl Marx Square named after Sverdlov, in Moscow (1961)
- Stalin Prize, 1st class (1950) – sculptural reliefs "Lenin and Stalin – founders and leaders of the Soviet state"
- People's Artist of the RSFSR (visual arts) (1967)
- People's Artist of the USSR (visual arts) (1977)
- Order of Karl Marx (East Germany)
- Goethe Prize winner (Germany)
- Medal "For the Defence of Moscow"
- Medal "For the Defence of the Soviet Transarctic"
- Medal "For the Capture of Berlin"
- Honorary Citizen of Smolensk and Polyarny
- Honorary Citizen of Karl-Marx-Stadt (presently Chemnitz)
- Honorary Citizen of Sofia (Bulgaria)
- Medal "For the Victory over Germany in the Great Patriotic War 1941–1945"
- Jubilee Medal "Twenty Years of Victory in the Great Patriotic War 1941–1945"
- Jubilee Medal "Thirty Years of Victory in the Great Patriotic War 1941–1945"
- Jubilee Medal "Forty Years of Victory in the Great Patriotic War 1941–1945"
- Jubilee Medal "50 Years of Victory in the Great Patriotic War 1941–1945"
- Jubilee Medal "60 Years of Victory in the Great Patriotic War 1941–1945"
