= Church of the Intercession, Rostov-on-Don =

Church in Rostov Oblast, Russia

Coordinates: 47.2259°N 39.7321°E

Church of the Intercession of the Holy Virgin
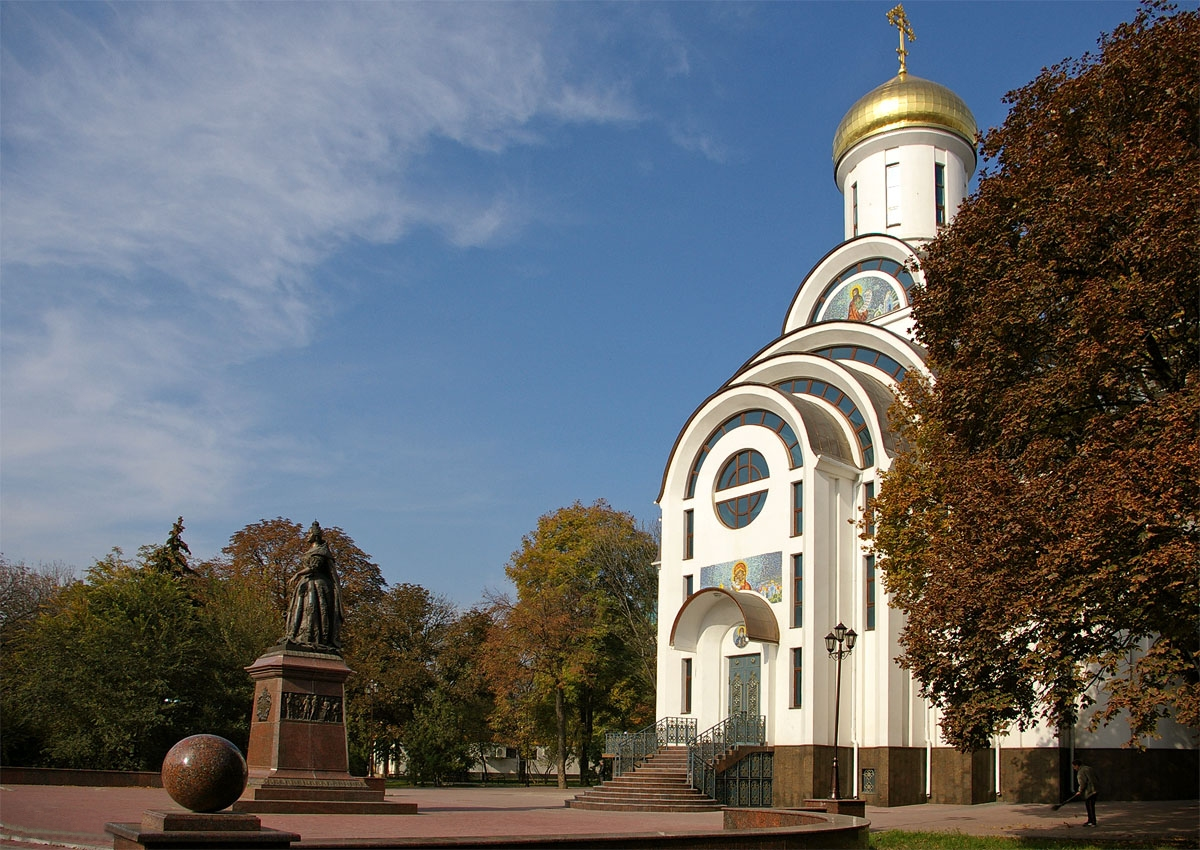

Religion
- Affiliation: Russian Orthodox

Location
- Location: Rostov-on-Don, Rostov Oblast Russia
- Interactive map of Church of the Intercession of the Holy Virgin

Architecture
- Architect: G.A. Shevchenko
- Completed: 2007

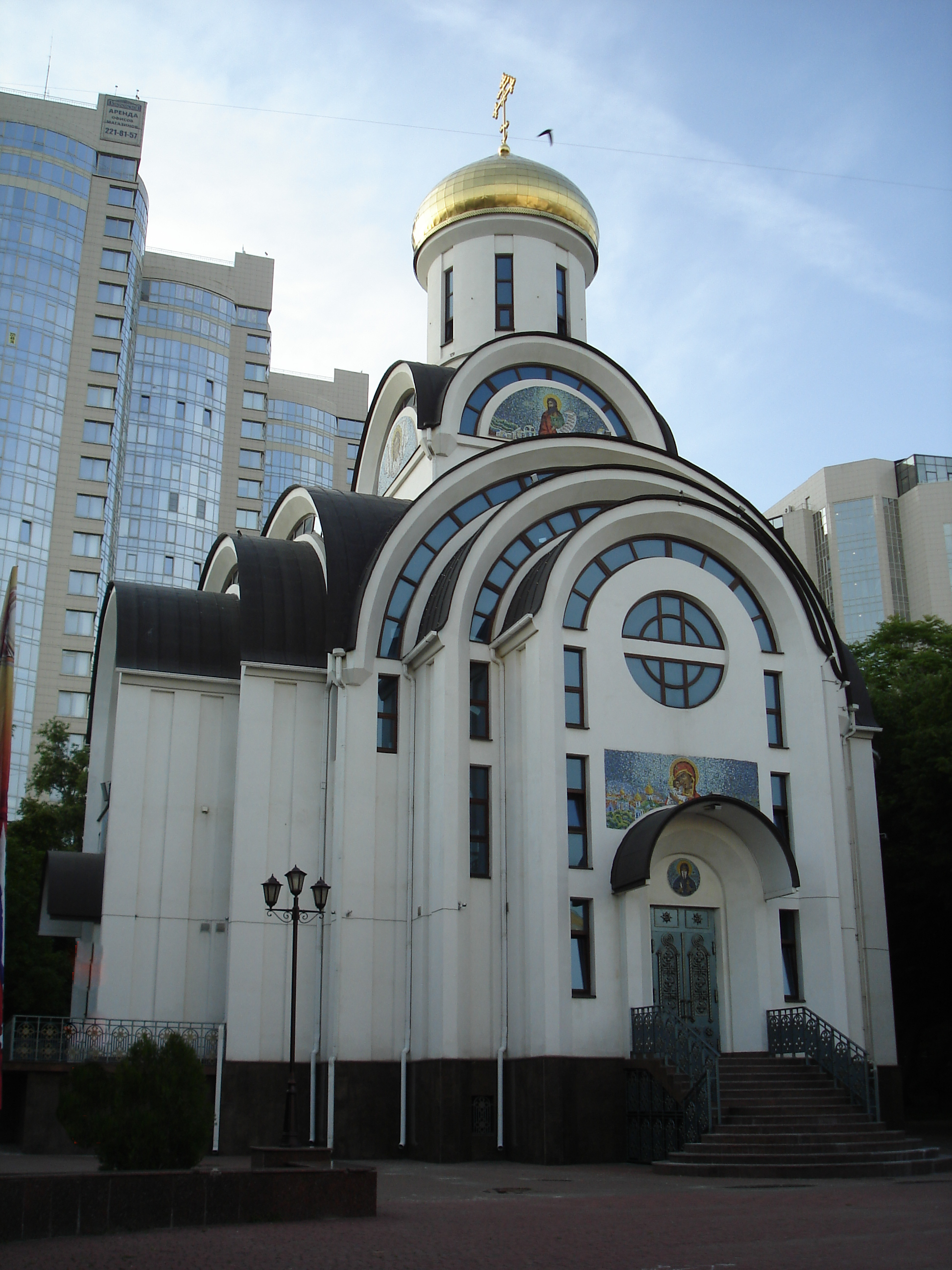
Church of the Intercession of the Holy Virgin, 2016

Church of the Intercession of the Holy Virgin (Russian: Церковь во имя Покрова Пресвятой Богородицы) is one of the oldest churches in Rostov-on-Don (there is a common misconception that it was the first church in the city). The original building was situated approximately at the corner of Bolshaya Sadovaya street. Over time, it has somewhat shifted towards Bogatyanovsky Lane (now Kirov Avenue).

== History ==
In 1762, after the demolition of St. Anne fortress, located near Cherkassk (nowadays ― Starocherkasskaya village) on Vasilyevsky hills, it was decided to transport the Holy Protection Church located therein to the newly built St. Dimitry of Rostov fortress. The church was dismantled, all logs were numbered and transported to the chosen place.

In 1781 the chief commandant Major General Simon Guryev sent a petition to Archbishop Nikiforov, head of the Slovenian and Kherson diocese, "for permission to organize a new and bigger church, to replace the dilapidated one." In 1782, the permission was granted. The old church building was dismantled and almost at the same place a new building (also wooden) was constructed. The consecration of the church took place on September 28, 1784.

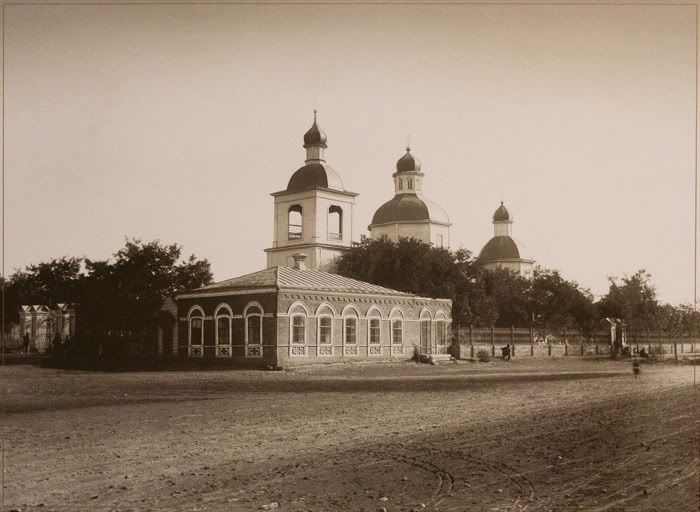
Old Church of the Intercession

On November 2, 1895 due to the negligence of the caretaker there was a fire, which has burned down the bell tower and damaged the building of the church itself.

On August 10, 1897 a new stone building was constructed on the project of architect Nikolay Sokolov.

However, the old damaged church had still stood for quite a long time and was demolished only in 1917.

== Description of the church built in 1909 ==
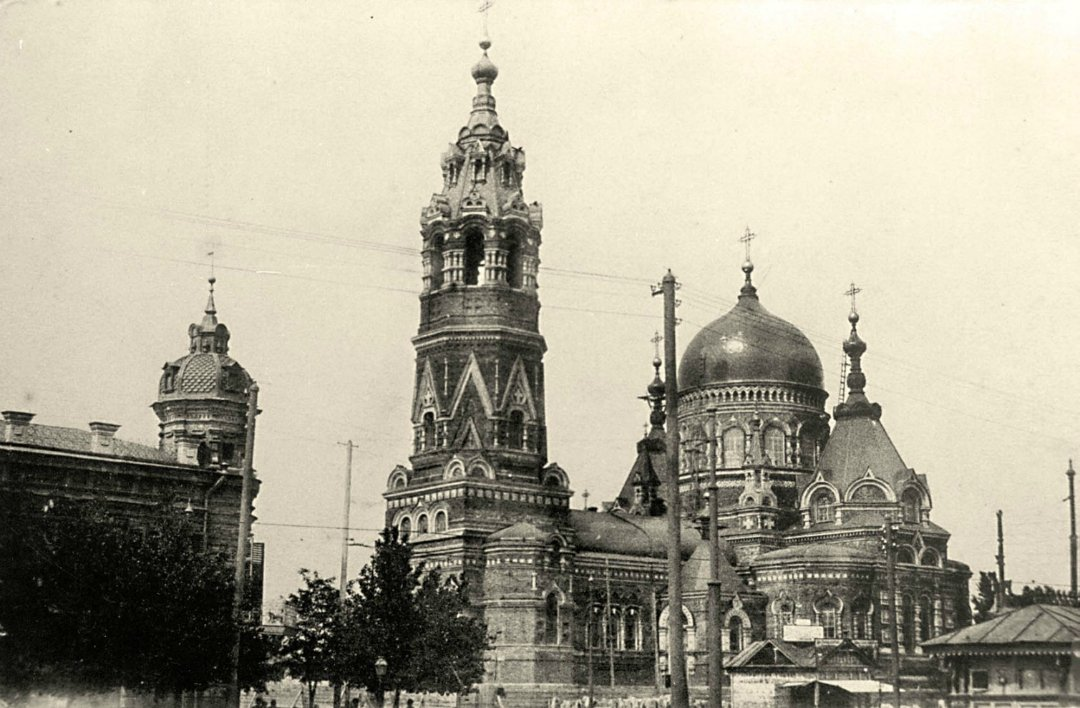
New Church of the Intercession. The corner of the Masalitina House visible to the left.

The building was constructed in Russian Revival style and had a width of 34 metres, 53 metres in length and also 53 metres in height (together with the cross). The height of the bell tower was 74,5 meters, with the main bell weighing 5100 kg.

In 1930 the church was demolished. In the following years a fountain was constructed on its place.

== Restoration of the church ==
In the post-soviet times, there were talks about the restoration of the church. On 3 February 2005, at the Kirov public garden was installed and consecrated a memorial cross and was laid the first symbolic stone in the foundation of the new church. The church, built on the project of architect G. Shevchenko, received the name of Old-Intercession (Старо-Покровская) and was consecrated on November 11, 2007.
