= Tashir, Republic of Buryatia =

Tashir Ташир
- Ulus
- Location within Republic of Buryatia Location within Russia
- Coordinates: 50°58′N 105°48′E
- Country: Russia
- Region: Republic of Buryatia
- District: Selenginsky District
- Time zone: UTC+8:00

Tashir (Russian: Ташир; Buryat: Ташар, Tashar) is a rural locality (an ulus) in Selenginsky District, Republic of Buryatia, Russia. The population was 1,206 as of 2010. There are 88 streets.
