= Monument to Friedrich Engels =

Historic monument

- Памятник Фридриху Энгельсу
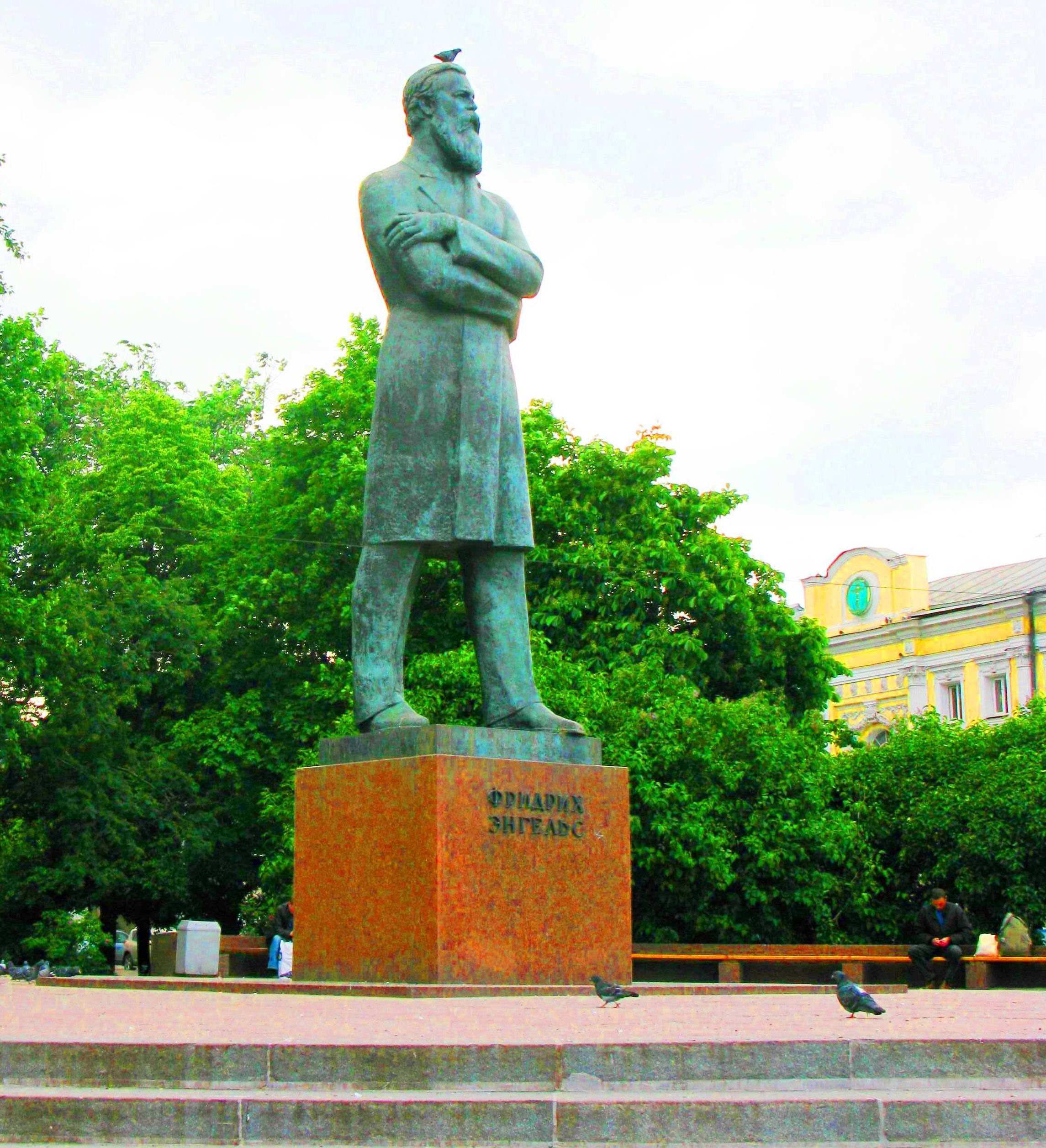
- Interactive map of Monument to Friedrich Engels
- Location: Moscow, Prechistenskie Gates Square
- Coordinates: 55°44′39″N 37°36′04″E
- Designer: A. A. Zavarzin, A. A. Usachev
- Material: Bronze
- Height: 6 m
- Completion date: 1976
- Dedicated to: Friedrich Engels

The Monument to Friedrich Engels (Russian: Памятник Фридриху Энгельсу) was installed in 1976 in Moscow near the metro station "Kropotkinskaya". The authors of the monument are sculptor I. I. Kozlovsky, architects A. A. Zavarzin and A. A. Usachev. The monument has the status of an identified cultural heritage site.

== History and description ==
In 1972, on the occasion of the visit of US President Richard Nixon to the USSR, "dilapidated" streets Ostozhenka and Prechistenka were demolished dilapidated houses, and in their place a square was laid out. Originally, the square had to be larger, however, since the "dilapidated" buildings on the site of the square were of obvious historical value, a local scandal arose among the Moscow intelligentsia, which resulted in the authorities' consent to the reduction of the square of the square and the restoration of the White and Red Chambers immediately behind it.

As a result, the square became too modest, after which, according to the decision of the Central Committee of the CPSU and the Council of Ministers of the USSR, it was decided to erect a monument to Friedrich Engels, a German philosopher and one of the founders of Marxism.

November 2, 1976, on the eve of the 59th anniversary of the October Revolution, the monument was opened with a large crowd of people. The first Secretary of the CPSU MGK V. V. Grishin, the Secretary of the CPSU Central Committee Mikhail V. Zimyanin, the Chairman of the Moscow City Council V. F. Promyslov, the Deputy Minister of Culture of the USSR V. V. Voronkov, the Ambassador of the GDR to the USSR G. Ott (German) Russian. and other officials.

VV Grishin cut the scarlet ribbon, after which a coverlet fell from the monument and the hymn of the Soviet Union sounded. At the meeting, the director of the Institute of Marxism-Leninism of the Central Committee of the CPSU, Academician A. G. Egorov, Hero of Socialist Labor metrostroevets P. A. Novozhilov and a student of Moscow State University T. Yu. Zuikova.

Since the monument is located next to the metro station "Kropotkinskaya" on the former Kropotkinskaya Square (now the area of Prechistenskie Vorota), many Muscovites mistake him for the monument to Kropotkin.

The bronze sculpture of Friedrich Engels 6 m high is installed on a cubic monolith-pedestal made of red granite. The monument stands in the center of the round in terms of a platform paved with stone slabs and framed by a low granite fence, supplemented by semicircular benches. From the area of Prechistenskie Gates to the monument leads a semicircular front staircase.

Friedrich Engels is shown in full growth with his arms crossed on his chest. The sculptor sought to convey the image of Engels in the 1870s, when he, together with Karl Marx, led the international working-class movement.

The monument and the playground around it practically completely absorbed the park, as a result of which the latter is not marked especially on the maps of Moscow and does not have its own name.

== See also ==
- Friedrich Engels Statue, Manchester
