= Karl Marx House =

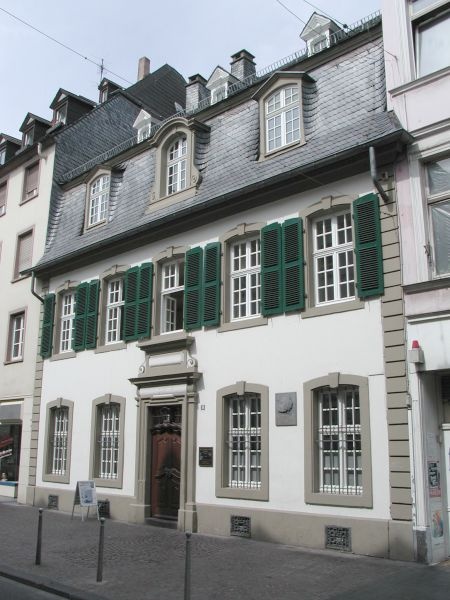
- Established: 1947
- Location: Trier
- Coordinates: 49°45′14″N 6°38′08″E
- Type: biographical museum
- Visitors: 50.000
- Owner: Friedrich Ebert Foundation
- Website: www.marx360.de/en.html

The Karl Marx House museum (German: Karl-Marx-Haus) is a biographical and writer's house museum in Trier (Rhineland-Palatinate, Germany). In 1818, Karl Marx, the father of Marxism, which influenced both modern socialism and communism, was born in the house. It is now a museum about Karl Marx's life and writings as well as the history of communism.

== History ==
The house was built in 1727 as a two-story baroque building. Karl Marx was born there on 5 May 1818. In October 1819, the Marx family moved to a smaller building near the Porta Nigra. The significance of the house went unnoticed until 1904, at which point the Social Democratic Party of Germany (SPD) attempted to acquire the home, succeeding in 1928. After the Nazi Party came to power in 1933, the building was confiscated and turned into a printing house.

On 5 May 1947 the building was opened as a museum of the life and works of Karl Marx. In 1968 it was integrated into the Friedrich Ebert Foundation, a political party foundation closely aligned with the SPD. On 14 March 1983, the 100th anniversary of Marx's death, the museum was re-opened after a year-long renovation that expanded it to three floors.

On 10 September 1987, during his diplomatic trip to West Germany, East German head of state Erich Honecker visited the Karl Marx House Museum and laid down 50 roses there.

== Exhibits ==
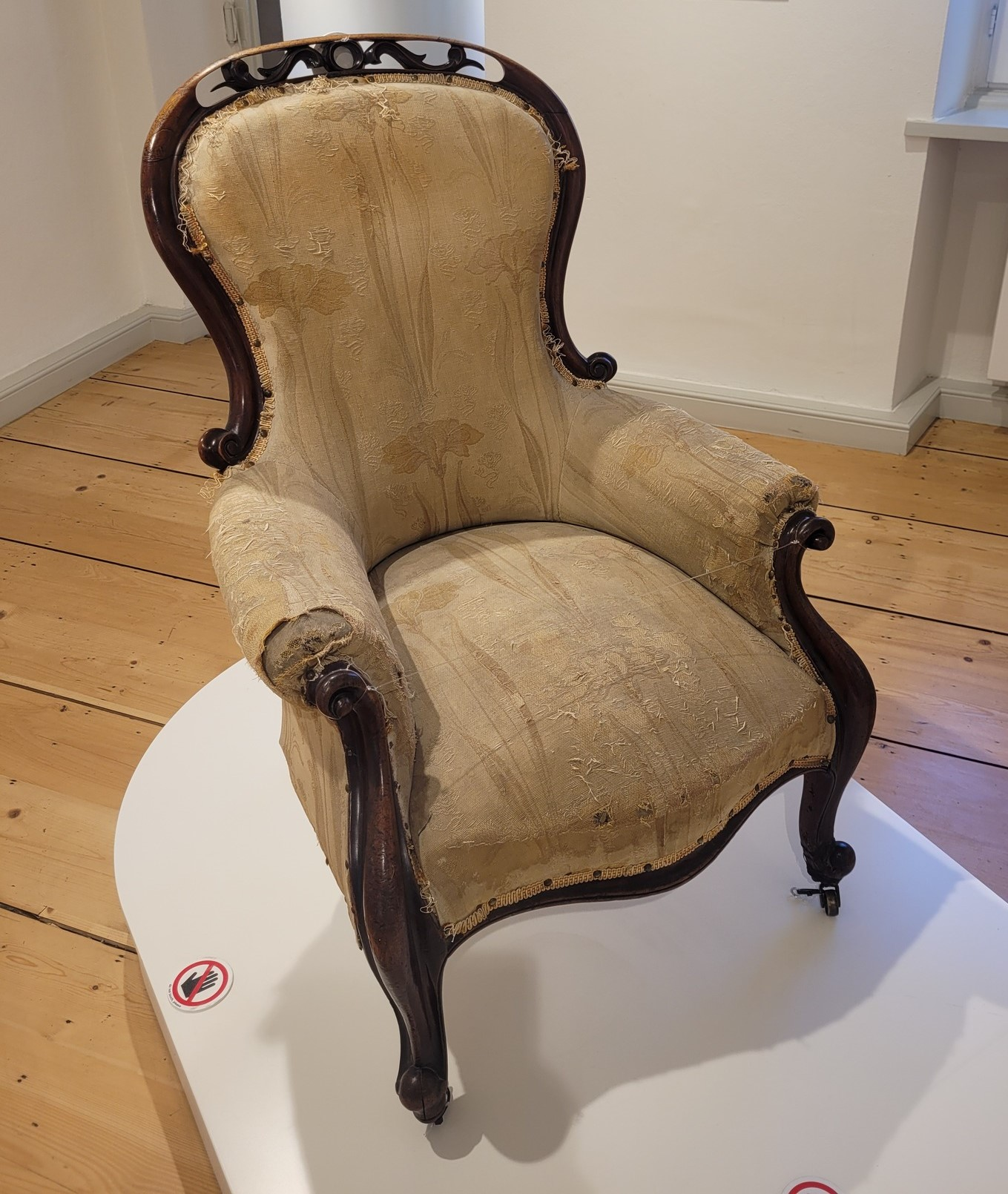
Karl Marx reading chair

On the occasion of the bicentennial of Karl Marx's birth on 5 May 2018, the exhibition was completely reworked with a new concept entitled "From Trier to the World. Karl Marx, his ideas and their impact until today". The exhibition consists of three major units and features a further unit on the history of the house itself. The first area deals with the biography of Karl Marx, addressing his origins in Trier and his life in exile. The second is devoted to his work, where Marx appears as a philosopher, as a journalist, as a sociologist and as an economist, and the third shows the global impact of Marx up to the present day.

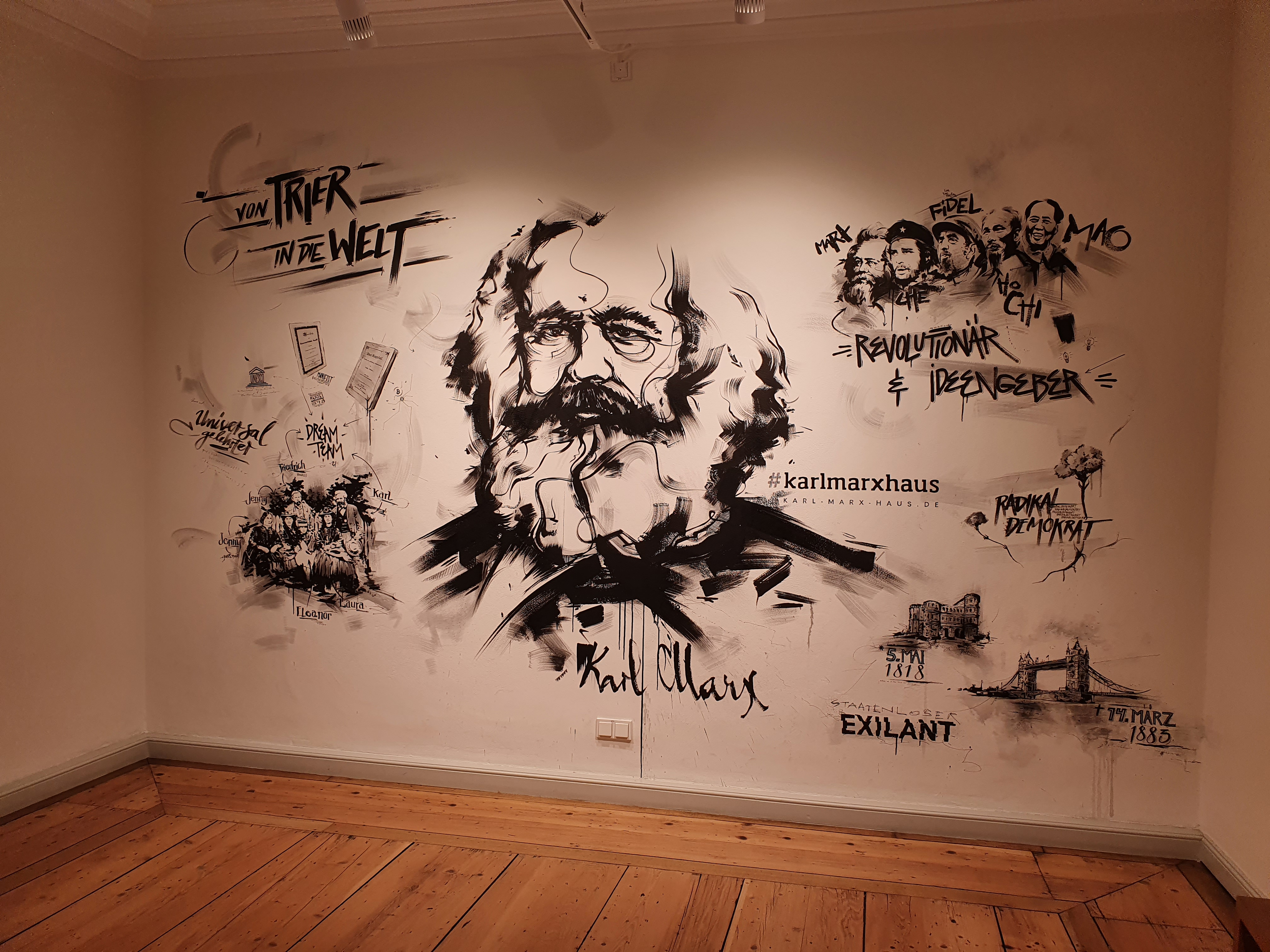
Graffiti in the entry room of the Karl Marx House

Amongst the exhibits are Marx's reading chair, a first edition of Das Kapital and a bust of Marx sculpted by his great-grandson.

The Karl Marx House currently receives about 50,000 visitors a year, of whom one third are Chinese tourists.

== See also ==
- Engels-Haus
