= Thamm =

Thamm is a surname. Notable people with the surname include:

- Alexander Thamm (born 1983), German footballer
- Carl Thamm (1874–1944), Australian cricketer
- Hans Thamm (1921–2007), German choral conductor
- Nikolai Thamm Jr. (1867–1948), Estonian architect
- Nikolai Thamm Sr. (1834–1907), Estonian architect
- Sylvia Anderson (née Thamm, 1927–2016), British voice artist and film producer
- Werner Thamm (born 1926), German footballer
- Vera Thamm, Paralympic swimmer
