= Nikolai Thamm =

Nikolai Thamm may refer to:

- Nikolai Thamm Sr. (1834–1907), Estonian architect
- Nikolai Thamm Jr. (1867–1948), Estonian architect
