= Great Synagogue of Tallinn =

Former Orthodox synagogue in Tallinn, Estonia

- Estonian: Tallinna suur sünagoog
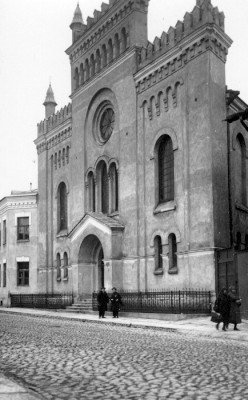
- The façade of the destroyed synagogue, c. 1900

- Location of the former synagogue in Estonia

Religion
- Affiliation: Orthodox Judaism (former)
- Ecclesiastical or organizational status: Synagogue (1884–1944)
- Status: Closed; partially destroyed and then demolished

Location
- Location: Tallinn
- Country: Estonia
- Interactive map of Great Synagogue of Tallinn
- Coordinates: 59°26′04″N 24°45′26″E

Architecture
- Architect: Nikolai Thamm Sr.
- Type: Synagogue architecture
- Completed: 1884
- Demolished: 1947 (following the WWII bombing of Tallinn)

Website
- muuseum.jewish.ee

The Great Synagogue of Tallinn (Estonian: Tallinna suur sünagoog) was an Orthodox Jewish synagogue, that was located in Maakri Street, Tallinn, Estonia. Nowadays, the Jews are using Tallinn Synagogue.

The synagogue was built in 1884, and it was designed by Nikolai Thamm Sr.

The bombing of Tallinn in World War II in 1944, resulted in the synagogue burning; and in 1947, the synagogue was demolished.

== See also ==
- History of the Jews in Estonia
- The Holocaust in Estonia
