= Tallinn Old Believers Chapel =

Church building in Tallinn, Estonia

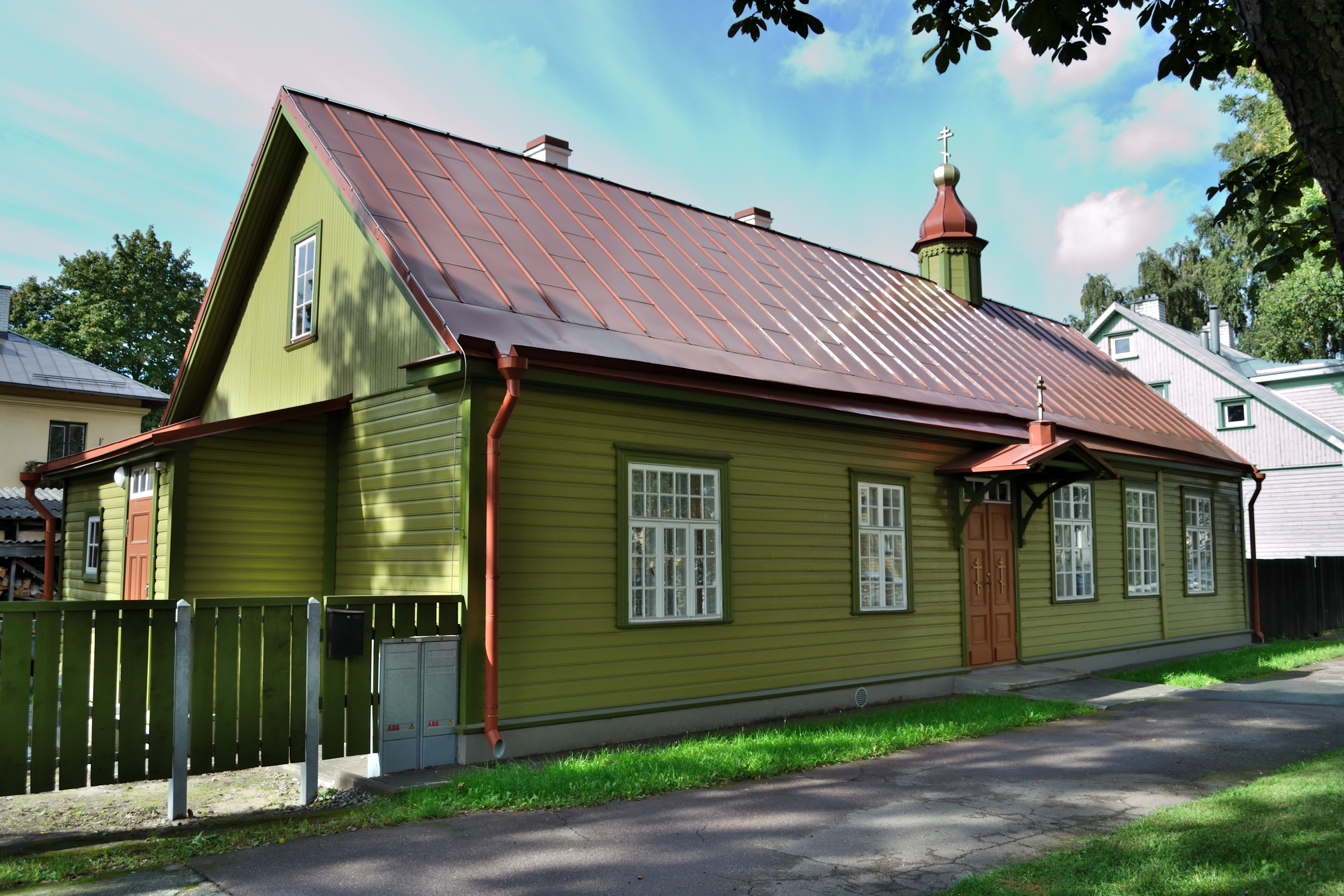
- Tallinn Old Believers Chapel
- 59°25′51″N 24°42′57″E
- Location: Tallinn
- Country: Estonia
- Denomination: Old Believers

Tallinn Old Believers Chapel (Estonian: Tallinna vanausuliste palvemaja, Russian: Храм Благовещения Пресвятой Богородицы, святителя Николы Чудотворца и девы Штефаниды, romanized: Khram Blagoveshcheniya Presvyatoy Bogoroditsy, svyatitelya Nikoly Chudotvortsa i devy Shtefanidy, lit. 'Church of the Annunciation of the Blessed Virgin Mary, Saint Nicholas the Wonderworker, and the Virgin Stephanida') is an Old Believers church building located at Kibuvitsa tänav 6 in Tallinn, Estonia. The building is used by Tallinn's Old Believers congregation.

The current Tallinn Old Believers Chapel was built in 1930 by Ado Mäeberg (1867–1945), whose wife Stepanida Mäeberg (née Belasova, 1863–1930) was an Old Believer. The building was designed by the engineer Joosep Lukk (1870–1958). A large donation was made for the construction of the prayer house by Yefimiya Sapozhnikova. Peeter Baranin and his wife made a large contribution to the creation of the iconostasis and the interior of the chapel.

In 1931, an extension was built, doubling the size of the original structure. The project was headed by the architect Nikolai Thamm Jr. The chapel was damaged in the 1944 March bombing, when the roof was destroyed. The onion-domed ridge turret of the chapel and other religious elements of the structure were removed in the 1960s.

Reconstruction of the chapel took place from 2007 to 2018, during which the turret was also restored. The project was headed by the architect Niina Mäger.
