= Suur-Pakri Church =

Church building in Harju County, Estonia

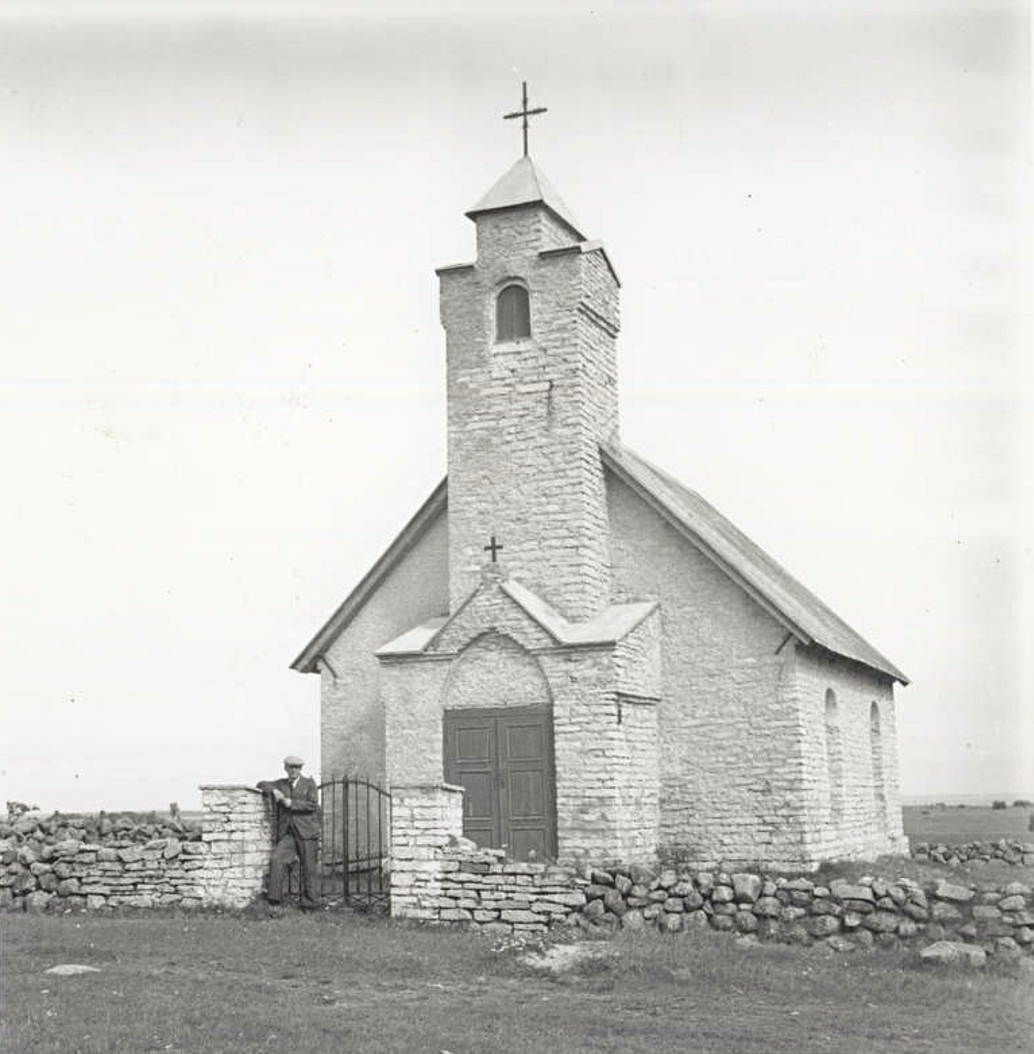
- Suur-Pakri Church in 1924
- Suur-Pakri Church
- 59°18′21″N 23°56′02″E
- Location: Paldiski, Harju county
- Country: Estonia
- Denomination: Lutheran

Suur-Pakri Church is a chapel undergoing renovation on the island of Suur-Pakri in Harju County, Estonia. The church is registered as a cultural monument.

The church was designed by Nikolai Thamm Sr. It was completed in 1897 and consecrated on July 13 the same year. The previous church had burned down in 1890.

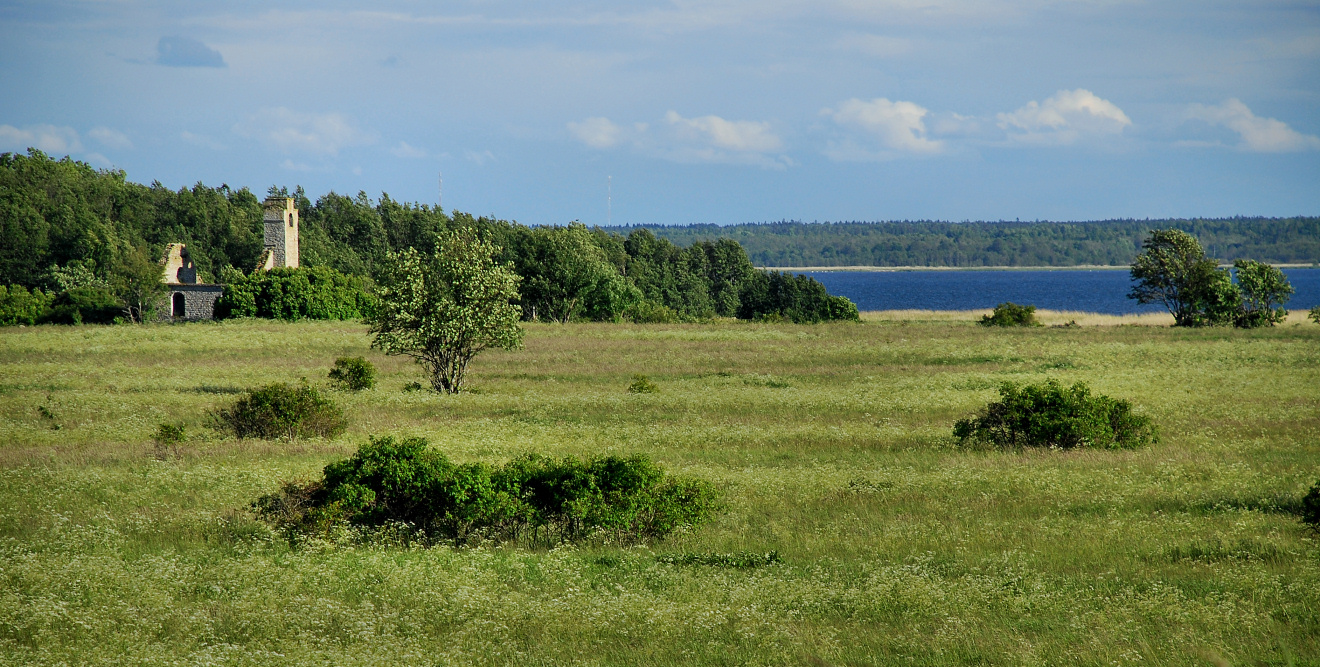
The church in 2009

The decline of the sanctuary began with the resettlement of the island's inhabitants in the spring of 1940. After the Second World War, the stone chapel remained under the control of the Red Army for a long time, and it was demolished rather than falling apart. The preservation of the masonry was helped by covering the top of the masonry with concrete slabs in 1993. The building is now covered with a tin roof, and doors and windows have been installed. There is also a small bell in the tower.

A service was held in the chapel on July 27, 2014, at which Patrick Göransson, a pastor from Rootsi-Mihkli parish, and Annika Laats, a pastor from Harju-Rist parish, officiated. On May 13, 2025, the chapel, whose restoration began in 1992, received a significant addition. Seventeen historical pews from Haljala Church and a pump organ from Finland were moved there.
