= Carl Thamm =

Australian cricketer

Personal information
- Born: 1 November 1874; Nuriootpa, South Australia
- Died: 4 July 1944 (aged 69)
- Source: Cricinfo, 28 September 2020

Carl Thamm (1 November 1874 – 4 July 1944) was an Australian cricketer. He played in one first-class match for South Australia in 1902/03.

== See also ==
- List of South Australian representative cricketers
