= Nikolai Thamm Jr. =

Estonian architect (1867–1948)

- Born: Nikolai Ludwig Jakob Thamm; June 12, 1867; Saint Petersburg, Russia
- Died: December 21, 1948 (aged 81); Aschersleben, Germany
- Occupation: Architect
- Father: Nikolai Thamm Sr.

Nikolai Ludwig Jakob Thamm (also Tamm; June 12, 1867 – December 21, 1948) was an Estonian architect.

== Early life and education ==
Nikolai Thamm Jr. was born in Saint Petersburg, Russia, the son of the architect Nikolai Thamm Sr. (1834–1907) and Maria Helene Thamm (née Oelcker, 1841–1894). In 1887 he graduated from Reval Peter the Great Science High School (now Tallinn Secondary School of Science) and in 1895 from the Higher Art School at the Saint Petersburg Academy of Arts.

== Career ==
From 1895 to 1907, Thamm worked as a junior engineer in the construction department of the Estonian provincial government and also as a teacher at Peter the Great Science High School. From 1917 to 1919 he worked in Russia, and from 1921 to 1927 he worked as an architect in the construction and apartment department of the Ministry of Defense in Tallinn.

== Works ==
- 1896–1900: assistant to Mikhail Preobrazhensky in construction of Alexander Nevsky Cathedral in Tallinn
- 1901: Harjumägi Concert Hall in Tallinn (destroyed)
- 1901–1902: supervised construction work on the Russalka Memorial on Kadriorg Beach in Tallinn
- 1903: Residential building at Narva maantee 28 in Tallinn
- 1907: Residential building at Võrgu tänav 6 in Tallinn
- 1909: Green Market Chapel at Pikk tänav 34A in Tallinn (with Nikolai Kheraskov)
- 1924: Naval crew barracks at Kopli tänav 76 in Tallinn
- 1931: Tallinn Old Believers Chapel extension at Kibuvitsa tänav 6 in Tallinn
- 1932: Residential building at August Weizenbergi tänav 8 in Tallinn
- 1934: Rakvere Catholic Church on Võidu tänav in Rakvere (demolished in 1973)
- 1938: Kodasema Catholic Center in Järva County
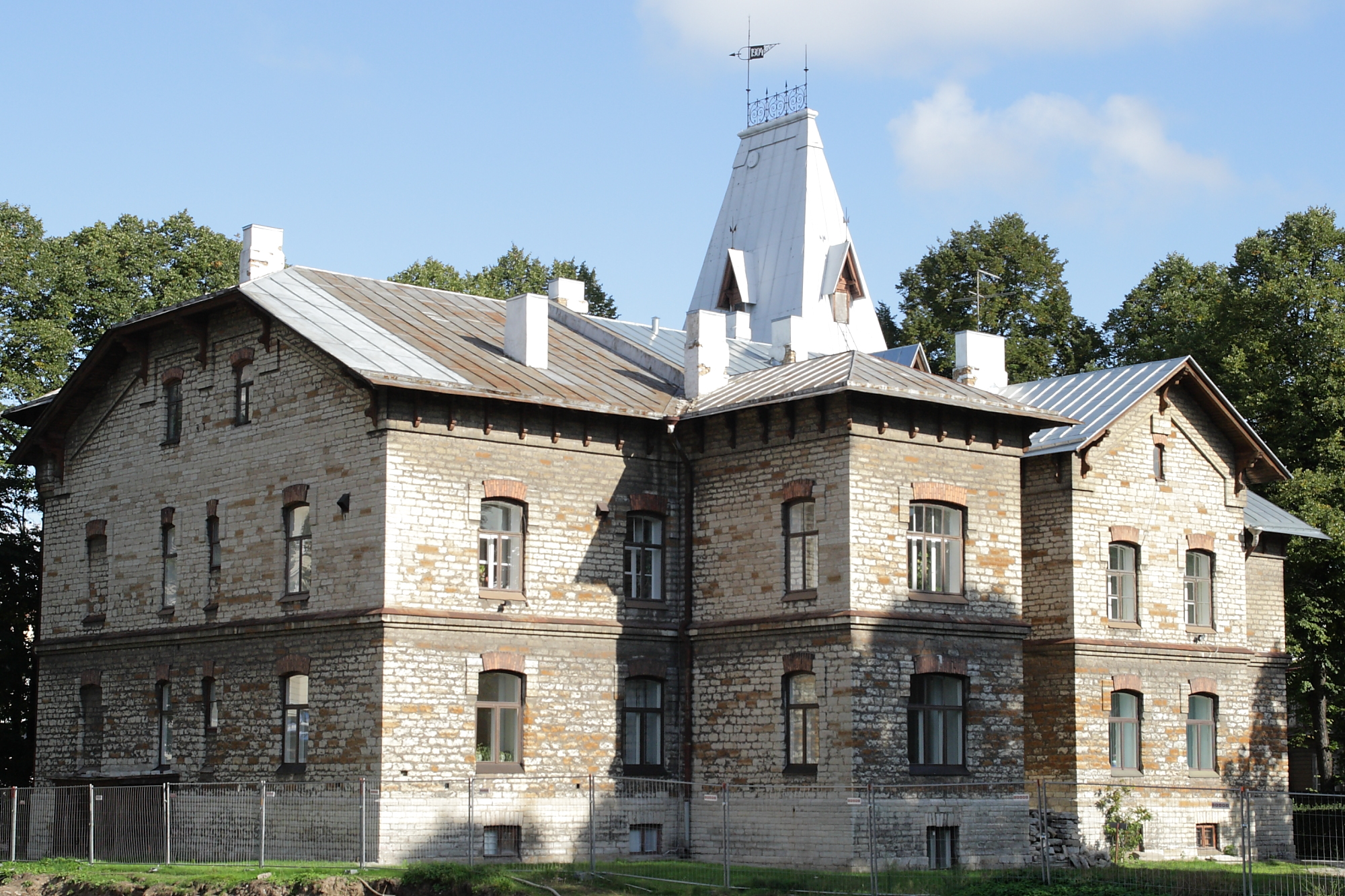
Residential building at Narva maantee 28 in Tallinn

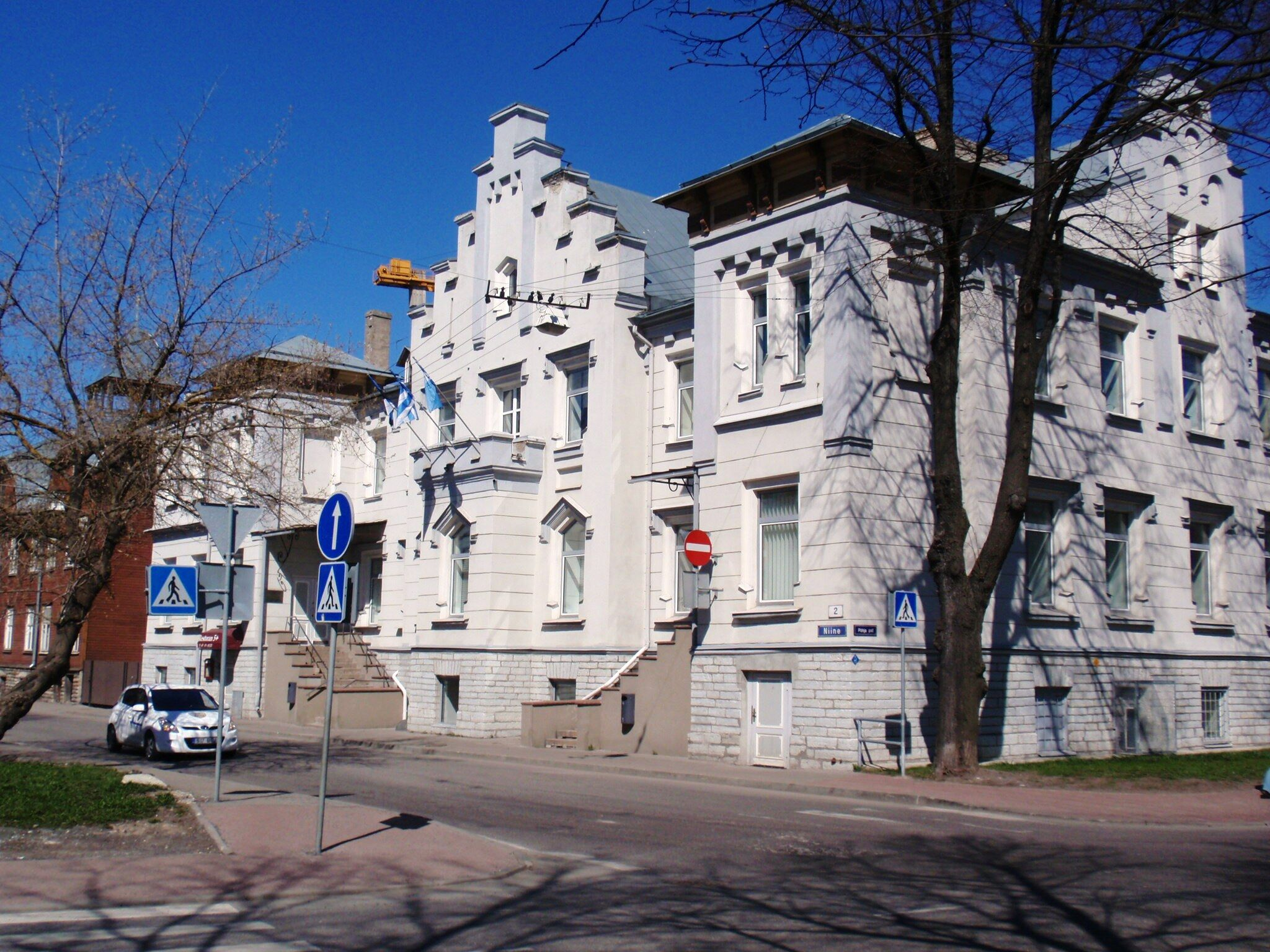
Former district administration building at Niine tänav 2 in Tallinn

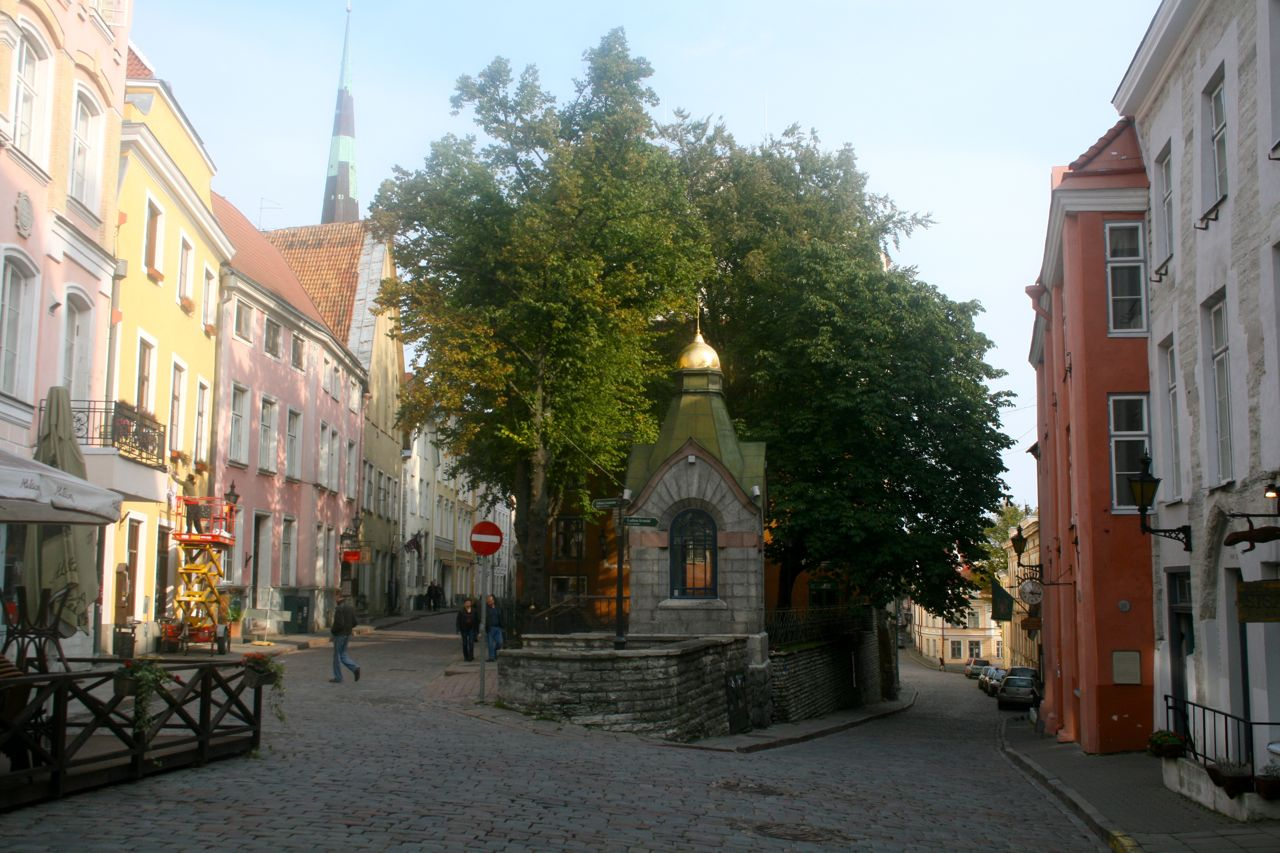
Green Market Chapel at Pikk tänav 34A in Tallinn

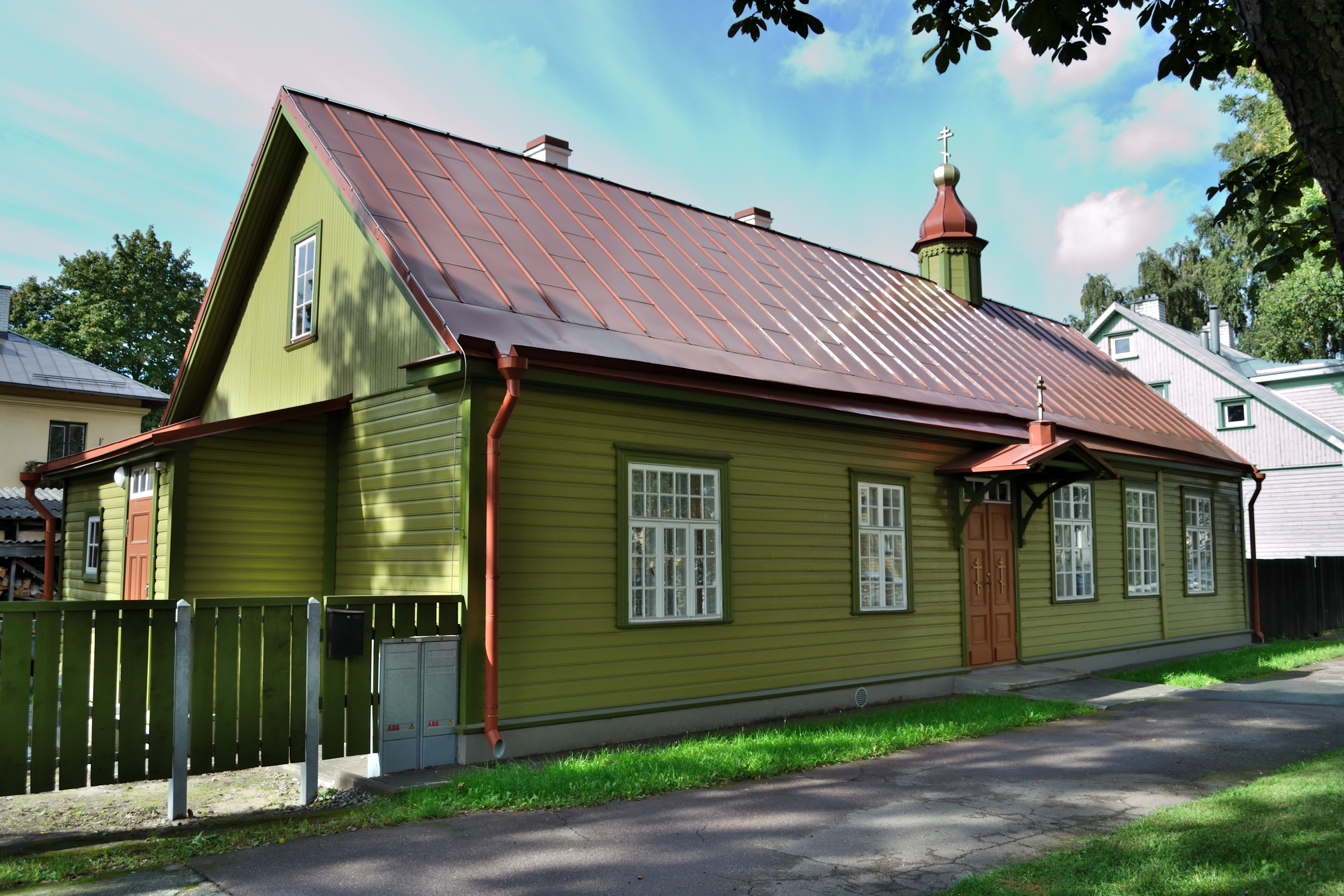
Tallinn Old Believers Chapel extension at Kibuvitsa tänav 6 in Tallinn

== Awards and recognitions ==
- 1903: Order of Saint Anna, third class

== Official rank ==
- 1913: State councillor
