= Nikolai Thamm Sr. =

Estonian architect (1834–1907)

- Born: Johann Nicolai Thamm; April 3, 1834; Tallinn, Estonia
- Died: August 5, 1907 (aged 73); Tallinn, Estonia
- Occupation: Architect
- Children: Nikolai Thamm Jr.

Johann Nicolai Thamm (April 3, 1834, Tallinn – August 5, 1907, Tallinn) was an Estonian architect.

== Early life and education ==
Nikolai Thamm was born in Tallinn, the son of Johann Gottlob Thamm (1782–1843) and Johanna Sophia Thamm (née Siefarth, 1801–1876). He studied at the Saint Petersburg Institute of Technology and graduated from the Saint Petersburg Academy of Arts in 1860.

== Career ==
Thamm worked as an architect in Tallinn from 1872 onward, where he primarily designed residential buildings.

== Works ==
- 1874: Main building of Maarjamäe Palace, construction manager (designer Robert Gödicke)
- c. 1875: Two-story historicist wooden house at Narva maantee 32, one of the oldest preserved two-story wooden houses recognized as a cultural monument in Tallinn. The exact construction date is unknown. The current appearance of the building dates back to 1875, the reconstruction project was carried out by Nikolai Thamm Sr., who was the owner of the house.
- Pikk tänav 16 / Pühavaimu tänav 1, reconstruction project, today Maiasmokk Café
- 1878: Restaurant-café at Rataskaevu tänav 3
- 1881–1883: F. Wiegand Machine Factory administration building, machine shop, and foundry
- 1882: Residential building at Lai tänav 7, reconstruction project
- 1882: Sauna at Tartu maantee 73
- 1884: Great Synagogue of Tallinn at Maakri tänav 5
- 1885: Boarding house for girls at Mardi tänav 3
- 1897: Suur-Pakri Church in Harju County
- 1899–1900: Suur-Karja tänav 20 / Pärnu maantee 12, originally Tallinn German Club, with Rudolf von Engelhardt
- Virumägi Summer Pavilion
